= Warner Lakes =

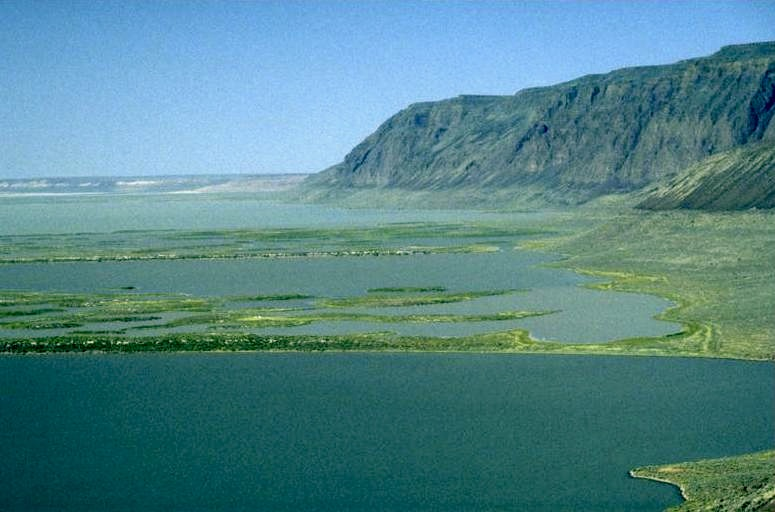
- Warner Lakes below Hart Mountain scarp

- Location within Oregon Location within the United States
- Location: Lake County, Oregon, United States
- Coordinates: 42.44988°N 119.85106°W
- Type: Endorheic lake
- Primary inflows: Twentymile Creek; Deep Creek; Honey Creek
- Primary outflows: None
- Basin countries: United States
- Max. length: 50 mi (80 km)
- Max. width: 5 mi (8.0 km)
- Surface area: 90,000 acres (360 km^{2})
- Max. depth: 14 ft (4.3 m)
- Surface elevation: 4,475 ft (1,364 m) at Hart Lake

The Warner Lakes are a chain of shallow lakes and marshes in the Warner Valley of eastern Lake County, Oregon, United States. The lakes extend the length of the valley, covering approximately 90,000 acres (360 km^{2}).

The lakes are named in honor of Captain William H. Warner, a topographical engineer who explored Warner Valley before being killed by Native Americans in 1849. The Warner Lakes and surrounding wetlands support a wide variety of birds and other wildlife. Much of the land surrounding the lakes is owned by the public and is administered by the Bureau of Land Management. These public lands provide recreational opportunities including hunting, fishing, bird watching, and camping.

== Warner Valley ==
The Warner Valley is in south-central Oregon. It is approximately 60 miles (97 km) long and 8 miles (13 km) wide. Most of the valley is in Lake County, however the north end of the valley extends about 10 miles (16 km) into Harney County. It is an alluvial basin containing numerous lakes, remnants of a single great lake that covered the valley floor up to 200 feet (61 m) deep during the Pleistocene epoch. Today, steep cliffs rise above a chain of endorheic lakes and interconnected wetlands, known collectively as Warner Lakes. The valley has two regions commonly referred to as South Warner Valley and North Warner Valley. The two areas transition between Crump Lake and Hart Lake at a point where the valley narrows to about 5 miles (8.0 km) in width.

Native Americans used the Warner Valley's lakes and wetland for thousands of years before the first white explorers arrived. There are scores of petroglyphs near the lake shores, some are estimated to be 12,000 years old. The Greaser Petroglyph Site, in the South Warner Valley, is listed on the National Register of Historic Places.

In December 1843, Captain John C. Fremont led a party through the valley. Fremont and his party spent Christmas Day camped near Hart Lake. In honor of the date, Fremont named it Christmas Valley and the lake Christmas Lake. However, early mapmakers mistakenly plotted Christmas Valley 60 miles (97 km) northwest of the Warner Valley, leaving the valley and lake unnamed on early maps. In 1849, the valley was explored by Captain William Horace Warner, an Army topographical engineer. On September 26, 1849, Warner was ambushed and killed by Indians just south of the Warner Valley. In 1864, Lieutenant Colonel C. S. Drew of the 1st Oregon Cavalry visited the valley while on a scouting expedition. Drew named the valley in honor of Warner, who he believed had been killed there.

In 1867, General George Crook decided to build a fort in the Warner Valley to prevent Indian raiding parties from passing through the area. To get his wagons across the wetlands, he directed a bridge to be built across a narrow, marshy channel between Hart Lake and Crump Lake. Forty soldiers of the 23rd Infantry Regiment under the command of Captain James Henton were assigned the task. The bridge was constructed between May 16, 1867, and July 24, 1867. Known as the Stone Bridge, it was actually a quarter mile long causeway constructed by hauling basalt boulders and smaller rocks from nearby Hart Mountain and dumping them into the marsh. Today, the Stone Bridge across the Warner wetlands still exists. It is listed on the National Register of Historic Places.

== Lakes and wetlands ==
At one time, the entire Warner Valley was covered by a single vast lake. However, the water level gradually receded, leaving a chain of lakes at the low spots with marsh land between the lakes. Today, the valley floor is occupied by a chain of lakes and wetlands covering over 90,000 acres (400 km^{2}). This includes 52,033 acres (210.57 km^{2}) designated by the Bureau of Land Management as the "Warner Wetlands Area of Critical Environmental Concern".

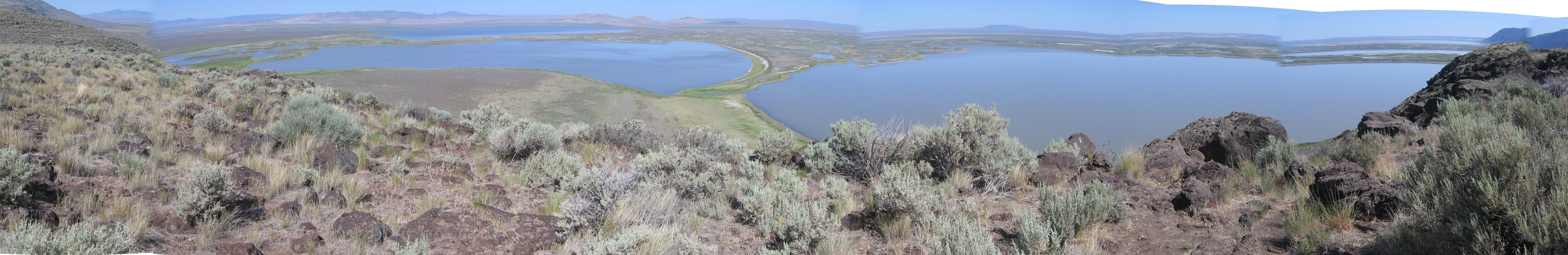
View of the Warner Lakes looking west from Hart Mountain
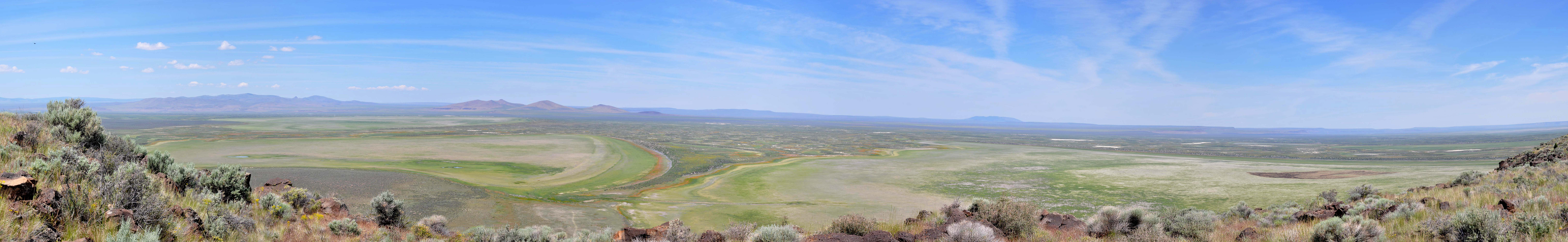
The same view during low water in June 2015. Upper Campbell Lake is to the left, Campbell Lake to the right.

There are numerous lakes in the Warner Lakes chain. Starting at the south end of the valley, the largest of the Warner Lakes are Pelican Lake, Crump Lake, Hart Lake, Anderson Lake, Swamp Lake, Mugwump Lake, Flagstaff Lake, Upper Campbell Lake, Lower Campbell Lake, Stone Corral Lake, Turpin Lake, and Bluejoint Lake. The valley slopes toward the north. As a result, Crump Lake is elevated 123 feet (37 m) higher than Bluejoint Lake.

The Warner Lakes are fed by Twentymile Creek and Deep Creek at the south end and Honey Creek which flows into Hart Lake. Most of the water from Twentymile Creek flows into Greaser Reservoir or into irrigation canals in the South Warner Valley. As field drainage, some of its water eventually merges with Deep Creek and flow into Pelican Lake.

- Deep Creek flows into Pelican Lake year around, providing much of the lake system's fresh water. From the north end of Pelican Lake there is a well-defined channel in the form of a deep slough that winds its way through the marsh land to Crump Lake.
- Crump Lake is named for Thomas Crump, who settled near the lake in the 1890s. It is the largest of the Warner Lakes, approximately 7 miles (11 km) long and 3 miles (4.8 km) wide with a surface area of approximately 7,680 acres (31.1 km^{2}) at normal water level. It is shallow, maintaining its level by overflowing into Hart Lake through a narrow marshy channel. When the flow from Deep Creek is unusually heavy, Crump Lake can overflow, flooding up to 10,000 acres (40 km^{2}) of surrounding marsh lands.
- Hart Lake is named for the heart shaped brand used by the pioneer Wilson and Alexander ranch established near the lake. Hart Lake has the most stable water level within the Warner Lakes chain. It not only gets the overflow from Crump Lake, it also received a steady flow of fresh water from Honey Creek. The north end of Hart Lake reaches a depth of around 14 feet (4.3 m) at a normal water level. The south half of the lake is comparatively shallow, averaging only about 6 feet (1.8 m) in depth.
- Anderson Lake is just north of Hart Lake. It is named after Thomas A. Anderson, who homesteaded near the lake. The valley drainage flows next into Swamp Lake and then into Mugwump Lake. The level in Mugwamp Lake can vary dramatically between the wet and dry seasons. This led to it being named after the politically independent and unpredictable mugwumps.
- North of Anderson Lake, there are high sand ridges covered with greasewood between the lakes and marsh drainages, some 50 feet (15 m) high. These form the shores of Flagstaff Lake, Upper Campbell Lake, Lower Campbell Lake, Turpin Lake, and Stone Corral Lake. The sand ridges generally occur on the lake's north shore. This indicates that the lake may have been dry for long periods, during which time southwesterly winds could have blown silt from the dry lake beds into dunes which in turn became shoreline when the lakes refilled.
- Bluejoint Lake is located at the far north end of Warner Lakes chain. It is named after the bluejoint grass common to the area. Bluejoint Lake covers a large area, but is very shallow. It is a pluvial lake that can be completely dry for extended periods of time.

In addition to the fresh-water creeks that flow into the Warner Lakes, there are a number of hot springs that drain into them. The hot springs originate in fractures within Miocene and Oligocene basalt layers below the valley floor. Their water temperature can be as hot as 160 °F (71 °C). Bacterial mats of green algae are common in the hot springs, the algae environments are segregated by temperature and water chemistry. The hot springs introduce minerals that change the water chemistry of the lakes. From late spring through summer the lakes are concentrated by evaporation. This produces moderate to high alkaline content in some areas of the lakes.

There is no outlet to the Warner Lakes system, so the water only slides northward while quickly evaporating from the surface of the lakes. The northern lakes are all very shallow, which provides ideal habitats for shore birds. Cranes and other shore birds can often be seen wading far from shore. However, these lakes can dry up during periods of low rainfall.

== Ecology ==
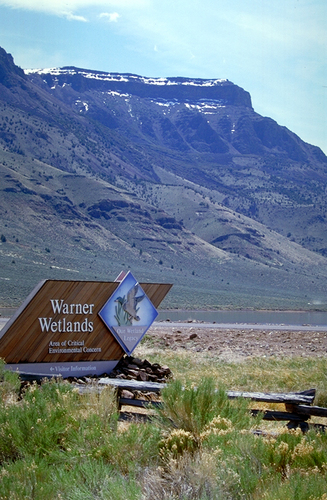
Warner Wetlands Interpretive Site

The Warner Lakes provide a unique habitat for wildlife including common high desert mammals, resident birds, and migrant waterfowl. Marsh grasses are common along the lake shores. Willow, cottonwood, choke cherry, wild plum, and wild roses are found in the riparian areas.

There are forty-two mammal species that live in the areas around the Warner Lakes. These include pronghorn, bighorn sheep, elk, mule deer, cougar, bobcat, and coyotes. Smaller mammals include jackrabbits, ground squirrels, chipmunks, skunks, and muskrats.

There are 239 species of birds that live in the area or migrate through the Warner Valley. Species that nest in the areas around Crump Lake and Hart Lake include sandhill cranes, American white pelicans, double-crested cormorants, willets, Wilson's phalaropes, gadwalls, northern shovelers, black-crowned night herons, Canada geese, and numerous varieties of ducks and terns. In addition, white-faced ibis, great white egrets, and American avocets are found in the marshes and along the lake shores. At the Warner Wetlands Interpretive Site, administered by the Bureau of Land Management, there are observation blinds where American bitterns, black-necked stilts, cinnamon teal, tundra swans, Brewer's blackbirds, western meadowlarks, swallows, and nighthawks are commonly seen.

In the riparian areas near the lakes, dusky flycatchers, yellow warblers, orange-crowned warblers, house wrens, and spotted towhees are common in the summer months. The valley around Warner lakes also hosts mountain chickadees, Cassin's finches, black-headed grosbeaks, green-tailed towhees, yellow-rumped warblers, MacGillivray's warblers, mountain bluebirds, white-headed woodpeckers, burrowing owls, and flammulated owls. The larger birds common to the Warner Lakes area include great horned owls, long-eared owls, prairie falcons, marsh hawks, golden eagles, and bald eagles.

== Recreation ==
Much of the Warner Valley is public lands, administered by the Bureau of Land Management. These public lands offer numerous recreational opportunities including hunting, fishing, bird watching, boating, and camping. However, some of these activities are dependent on the water levels of the Warner Lakes, which can fluctuate dramatically. Hart Lake has the most stable water level and is usually available for fishing and boating. Crappie, smallmouth bass, and bullhead catfish are common in the Warner Lakes while trout including Great Basin redband trout are found in Twentymile Creek, Deep Creek, and Honey Creek. There is also a 10-mile (16 km) canoe trail within the Bureau of Land Management's Warner Wetlands preserve that follows marsh channels from the Campbell lakes through Turpin Lake to Stone Corral Lake when water levels are sufficiently high. It is recommended any visitors contact the Bureau of Land Management's district office in Lakeview, Oregon, for information on the current lake levels before planning canoe trips in the northern lakes. There are no developed campgrounds in the Warner Valley. However, dispersed camping is allowed on land administered by the Bureau of Land Management. There are also public restrooms, sheltered picnic tables, and hiking trails at the Warner Wetlands Interpretive Site at Hart Bar.

== Location ==
The Warner Lakes have relatively few visitors because their remote location. Lakeview is the nearest incorporated town. To reach the Warner Lakes from Lakeview, travel north on U.S. Route 395 for 5 miles (8 km), then turn east on Oregon Route 140. This highway crosses the summit of the Warner Mountains, passing the Warner Canyon Ski Area on the way. The road forks 21 miles (34 km) from Lakeview. The main highway continues east while County Road 3–13 departs to the northeast. Following the main highway for 11 miles (18 km) leads to Adel in South Warner Valley, near the south end of Pelican Lake. Following County Road 3–13 leads to the North Warner Valley. The pavement ends 13 miles (21 km) past the junction, at the small unincorporated community of Plush, approximately two miles west of Hart Lake. A gravel road continues north along the Warner Lakes to headquarters of the Hart Mountain National Antelope Refuge, 19 miles (31 km) beyond Plush.
