= Crump Lake (Oregon) =

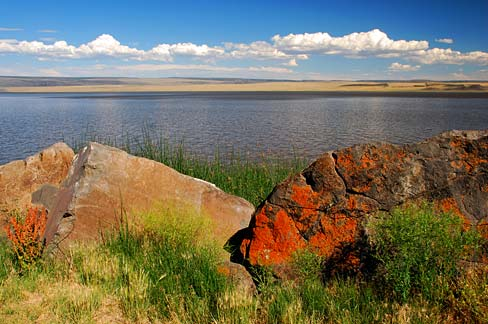
- Crump Lake shoreline

- Location of Crump Lake in Oregon
- Location: Eastern Lake County, Oregon, US
- Coordinates: 42.2946°N 119.8252°W
- Lake type: Natural lake
- Primary inflows: Deep Creek and Twelvemile Creek
- Primary outflows: Wetland channel to Hart Lake
- Catchment area: 835 square miles (2,160 km^{2})
- Max. length: 7.2 mi (11.6 km)
- Max. width: 2.8 mi (4.5 km)
- Surface area: 7,680 acres (31.1 km^{2})
- Average depth: 3 ft (0.91 m)
- Max. depth: 6 ft (1.8 m)
- Shore length^{1}: 70.9 mi (114.1 km)
- Surface elevation: 4,476 ft (1,364 m)
- ^{1} Shore length is not a well-defined measure.

Crump Lake is a shallow lake in the Warner Valley of eastern Lake County, Oregon, United States. The lake covers 7,680 acres (31.1 km^{2}). It is the largest of the Warner Lakes system. The lake is named for pioneer rancher Thomas Crump. Crump Lake is owned by the Oregon Department of State Lands. Much of the land around the lake is administered by the Bureau of Land Management and the United States Fish and Wildlife Service. The lake and the surrounding wetlands support a wide variety of birds and other wildlife. Recreational opportunities on or near Crump Lake include fishing, bird watching, and camping.

== Geography ==
Crump Lake is located 4.5 miles (7.2 km) north of the unincorporated community of Adel, Oregon at the southern end of the Warner Valley in south-central Oregon. The valley is approximately 60 miles (97 km) long and 8 miles (13 km) wide. Most of the valley is in Lake County, however the north end of the valley extends about 10 miles (16 km) into Harney County. It is an alluvial basin containing numerous lakes, remnants of a single great lake that covered the valley floor up to 200 feet (61 m) deep during the Pleistocene epoch. Today, steep cliffs rise above a chain of endorheic lakes including Crump Lake, known collectively as Warner Lakes. The valley has two regions commonly referred to as South Warner Valley and North Warner Valley. The two areas transition between Crump Lake in the south and Hart Lake to the north at a point where the valley narrows to about 5 miles (8.0 km) in width.

There are numerous lakes in the Warner Lakes chain. Starting at the south end of the valley, the Warner Lakes are Pelican Lake, Crump Lake, Hart Lake, Anderson Lake, Swamp Lake, Mugwump Lake, Flagstaff Lake, Upper Campbell Lake, Lower Campbell Lake, Stone Corral Lake, Turpin Lake, and Bluejoint Lake. The valley slopes toward the north. As a result, the elevation of Crump Lake is 13 feet (4.0 m) higher than Bluejoint Lake. Ultimately, the Warner Lakes system has no outlet so its waters eventually evaporate from the lake surfaces and associated wetlands.

== History ==
Native Americans used the Warner Valley's lakes and wetland for thousands of years before the first white explorers arrived. There are ancient Native American petroglyphs near Crump Lake, some are estimated to be 12,000 years old. The Greaser Petroglyph Site, located approximately 4 miles (6.4 km) southeast of Crump Lake, is listed on the National Register of Historic Places.

In 1867, General George Crook decided to build a fort in the Warner Valley to prevent Indian raiding parties from passing through the area. To get his wagons across the wetlands, he directed a bridge be built across a narrow, marshy channel between Crump Lake and Hart Lake. Forty soldiers of the 23rd Infantry Regiment under the command of Captain James Henton were assigned the task. The bridge was constructed between 16 May and 24 July 1867. Known as the Stone Bridge, it was actually a quarter mile long causeway constructed by hauling basalt boulders and smaller rocks from the slopes of nearby Hart Mountain and dumping them into the marsh. Today, the Stone Bridge across the Warner wetlands still exists. It is listed on the National Register of Historic Places.

Crump Lake is named for Thomas Crump (1854–1939), a pioneer rancher who settled near the lake in the 1890s. In 1959, a well drilled on the Crump Ranch approximately .75 miles (1.21 km) southwest of the lake created Crump Geyser. Water from the geyser drains into a wetland channel that feeds into the lake.

Originally, there was a small island near the center of Crump Lake used by nesting water birds. During a drought period in the 1950s, the island was scoured away by heavy equipment being used to unearth Native American artifacts. In the 1990s, the Oregon Department of Fish and Wildlife attempted to restore the island, but wind and wave action quickly eroded it away again. In 2008, the United States Army Corps of Engineers built a 1 acre (0.40 ha) nesting site at the location of the original island. It was specifically designed to resist erosion and the surface was covered with sand and gravel to create nesting habitat for Caspian terns. Since its completion, the new island has become a successful nested site for terns and other water birds.

In 2015, the Oregon Department of State Lands closed Crump Lake to the public because several years of drought had dramatically reduced the lake's water level. The closure was intended to protect the lakebed from looting by cultural artifact hunters. This temporary closure was lifted in October 2016, as state officials determined water levels to be improved.

== Lake environment ==
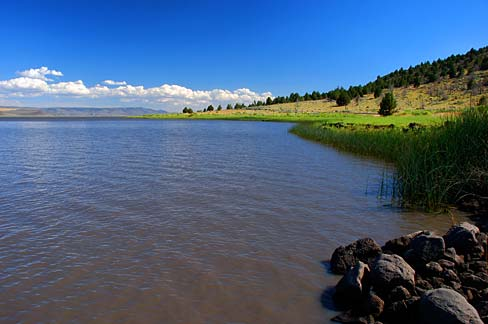
Crump Lake and its shoreline environment

Crump Lake is a natural lake that covers 7,324 acres (29.64 km^{2}). It is approximately 7.2 miles (11.6 km) long and 2.8 miles (4.5 km) wide, making it the largest of the Warner Lakes under normal conditions. The lake has an average depth of 3 feet (0.91 m) with a maximum depth of 6 feet (1.8 m). It received a steady flow of fresh water from Deep Creek and Twelvemile Creek which helps to stabilize the water level in the lake. It also receives excess water from Pelican Lake through a series of marshy channels. The outflow from Crump Lake drains north into Hart Lake through a narrow wetland channel.

The water clarity in Crump Lake is murky due to the presence of suspended organic particles. Sodium and potassium are the most abundant of the dissolved elements, together they comprise 46 percent of the dissolved-solids in the lake. However, because the lake overflows for several months during most years, Crump Lake has less turbidity than most closed-basin lakes. The water transparency is not a good indicator of the lake's trophic state. In fact, the amount of nutrients in the lake is very high with significant concentrations of phosphorus and chlorophyll indicating a hypereutrophic condition.

== Ecology ==
Crump Lake provides a unique habitat for plants and animals. The main cliff face of Hart Mountain ends near the north end of the lake, providing a rim rock habitat in that area. The area along the lake's eastern shore is typical high desert scrubland dominated by big sagebrush. The areas to the south and west of the lake are mostly mashes, meadows, and grasslands. In these areas, marsh grasses are common along the lake shores. Common wildlife includes common high desert mammals, resident birds, and migrant waterfowl.

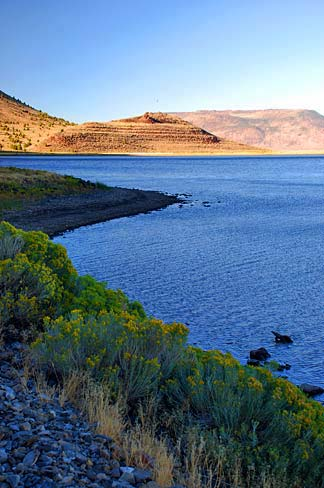
The lake provides wildlife habitat

Crump Lake's native fish species include a Warner Valley subspecies of redband trout and the Warner sucker. The redband trout and a small population of Warner suckers are found in Twelvemile Creek as well as the lake. Redband trout are also found in Deep Creek. These stream-dwelling populations have likely been the source for re-colonizing Crump Lake after extended drought periods killed off the lake's fish populations. In addition to the native fish, crappie, smallmouth bass, and bullhead catfish have been introduced into the Crump Lake. These non-native species have put significant pressure on the native fish species. As a result, the Warner Valley redband trout and the Warner sucker are classified as threatened species.

There are over forty mammal species that live in the areas around Crump Lake. These include pronghorn, bighorn sheep, elk, mule deer, cougar, bobcat, and coyotes. Smaller mammals include jackrabbits, ground squirrels, chipmunks, skunks, and muskrats.

There are numerous species of birds that live near Crump Lake or stop over at the lake during their migrations. Species that nest in the areas around Hart Lake include sandhill cranes, American white pelicans, double-crested cormorants, willets, Wilson's phalaropes, American coots, gadwalls, northern shovelers, black-crowned night herons, Canada geese, and numerous varieties of ducks and terns. In addition, white-faced ibis, great white egrets, and American avocets are found in the marshes and along the lake shores. There are observation blinds maintained by the Bureau of Land Management at the near-by Warner Wetlands Interpretive Site where American bitterns, black-necked stilts, cinnamon teal, tundra swans, Brewer's blackbirds, western meadowlarks, swallows, and nighthawks are commonly seen.

In the meadows and marshes around the lake, dusky flycatchers, yellow warblers, orange-crowned warblers, house wrens, and spotted towhees are common in the summer months. The valley around Crump Lake also hosts mountain chickadees, Cassin's finches, black-headed grosbeaks, green-tailed towhees, yellow-rumped warblers, MacGillivray's warblers, mountain bluebirds, white-headed woodpeckers, burrowing owls, and flammulated owls. The larger birds common to the Crump Lake area include great horned owls, barn owls, long-eared owls, prairie falcons, marsh hawks, golden eagles, and bald eagles.

== Recreation ==
Crump Lake is owned and managed by the Oregon Department of State Lands. Large sections of the Warner Valley around the lake are also publicly owned. The Bureau of Land Management is responsible for much of this land. In addition, the land along the north side of the lake is part of the Hart Mountain Antelope Refuge which is administered by the United States Fish and Wildlife Service. These public lands offer numerous recreational opportunities including fishing, bird watching, boating, hunting, and camping. However, some of these activities are dependent on the water levels of the Warner Lakes system, which can fluctuate dramatically from year to year.

During most years, Crump Lake is available for fishing and boating. While most people fish from the shore, small boats and canoes are also used to fish on the lake. The most popular game fish are crappie, largemouth bass, and brown bullhead. During an extended period of high water in the mid-1980s, crappie fishing was particularly good with some catches exceeding two pounds.

There are no developed campgrounds near Crump Lake. However, dispersed camping is allowed on Bureau of Land Management administered lands near to the lake. There is also a day-use recreation site approximately 10 miles (16 km) north of Crump Lake at the Warner Wetlands Interpretive Site. The site has public restrooms, sheltered picnic tables, birdwatching areas, and hiking trails.
