= Deep Creek Falls (Oregon) =

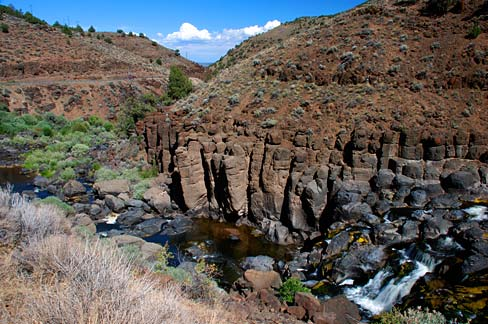
- Deep Creek Falls seen from Highway 140
- Interactive map of Deep Creek Falls
- Location: Warner Valley
- Coordinates: 42.17386°N 119.94992°W
- Elevation: 4,873 ft (1,485 m)
- Total height: 25 ft (8 m)

Deep Creek Falls is a waterfall formed along Gibson Canyon on the south end of Warner Valley, east side of the city of Lakeview in Lake County, Oregon. Access to Deep Creek Falls is located along Oregon Route 140 through unmarked paths that lead down to the stream and the base of the waterfall.

The falls act as a barrier against upstream migration for some fish species. For example, the Warner sucker is only found downstream from the falls. The falls also divide the creek's native redband trout into two distinct populations, one upstream from the falls and another downstream. However, the falls do not appear to function as a barrier for all species such as the brook trout or hatchery fish released in Deep Creek.

The lower portion of Deep Creek follows Oregon Route 140. The falls are a common recreational stop for travelers along the highway. Travellers often pull off the highway near the falls to stretch or fish. Deep Creek Falls are also a popular stop along the Oregon Outback Scenic Bikeway, which follows Route 140 along the section that passes the falls.

The steep cliffs that flank the falls are good habitat for cliff swallows, falcons, and eagles.

== See also ==
- List of waterfalls in Oregon
