= William H. Warner =

- Born: 8 May 1812; Columbia County, New York
- Died: 26 September 1849 (aged 37); Northeastern California
- Military career
- Allegiance: United States
- Branch: United States Army
- Service years: 1836–1849
- Rank: First Lieutenant; Brevet Captain
- Unit: Corps of Topographical Engineers
- Conflicts: Second Seminole War; Mexican–American War

William Horace Warner (8 May 1812 – 26 September 1849) was an officer in the United States Army's Corps of Topographical Engineers. In 1849, he led an Army survey party north from Sacramento through the uncharted country of northeastern California into south central Oregon. Warner was killed by Native Americans in northeastern California, just south of the Oregon border. In the mid-nineteenth century, two army outposts in southern Oregon were named after Warner. Today, the Warner Mountains, Warner Valley, and a number of other landmarks bear his name.

== Early life ==
Warner was born on 8 May 1812 in Columbia County, New York. He attended West Point, entering the school in July 1831 and graduating on 1 July 1836. Warner graduated from West Point, tenth in a class of 49 cadets. Upon graduation, he was commissioned as a second lieutenant and assigned to the United States Army's 1st Regiment of Artillery.

As a second lieutenant, Warner served in the Second Seminole War from mid-1836 until 1838. He was then assigned to help oversee the movement of the Cherokee Nation to the west. On 7 July 1838, Warner was appointed to the Corps of Topographic Engineers, retaining his rank of second lieutenant. As a topographic engineer officer, Warner was placed in charge of a project to improve the harbor at New Bedford, Massachusetts. He led that effort until 1839, when he was directed to survey of Sackets Harbor in New York. Later that year, Warner was sent back to Florida to support action in the ongoing war with the Seminole people. Then in 1840, Warner was directed to survey the Detroit River in Michigan. He finished that assignment in 1841.

On 1 September 1841, he was promoted to first lieutenant in the Corps of Topographical Engineers. After his promotion, Warner was sent to do a reconnaissance of the approaches to New Orleans in Louisiana. After completing that job in 1842, he was assigned to conduct a general survey of Lake Michigan and make recommendations for improving harbors around the lake. That effort lasted into 1843. Warner was then directed to conduct a survey of the Ohio River near Pittsburgh, Pennsylvania. After finishing that project in 1845, Warner was sent to survey the boundary between the United States and the British provinces of Canada.

Warner was actively engaged in the Mexican–American War. He was assigned to Brigadier General Stephen W. Kearny's California expedition. On 6 December 1846, Warner participated in the Battle of San Pasqual, where he was wounded. After the battle, he was recognized for gallantry in the field and promoted to Brevet Captain.

== California ==
From 1847 to 1849, Warner was assigned to do survey work in California. In May 1847, he surveyed Alcatraz Island. His work was the first detailed examination of the island. In May 1848, Warner began a survey of the military reservation at the Presidio in San Francisco. Later in 1848, Warner surveyed the Sacramento town site with the assistance of Lieutenant William T. Sherman.

In October 1848, Warner joined Lieutenant Sherman, Colonel Richard B. Mason (the military governor of California), and a civilian named Norman S. Bestor to form a mercantile company. Each of the four investors contributed $500 to the venture. Their plan was to open a general store in Coloma, California to sell supplies to miners. After the company was formed, the business was turned over to Bester to run with the help of a clerk who had previously worked for Warner.

In January 1849, Warner participated in the first criminal trial held in Sacramento County, California under United States law. The trial prosecuted a store keeper named Charles F. Pickett for the murder of a rival merchant. Warner attended the public meeting that appointed a judge and prosecutor for the trial. A few days later when the trial occurred, Warner was selected to serve on the jury. The trial ended in a deadlocked jury and Pickett was freed on bond.

== 1849 expedition ==
In early 1849, Colonel Mason directed Warner to lead a survey party up the Sacramento River and explore the upper reaches of the Pit River in northeastern California. The purpose of the expedition was to scout for mountains passes that could be used for an east–west railroad route. Warner was also looking for a suitable site where an army post could be built in northeastern California. Warner's second-in-command for the expedition was Second Lieutenant Robert S. Williamson, who was also a West Point trained topographic engineer.

Warner and his party started late in the summer, departing Sacramento in August 1849. The expedition's progress was further delayed by the area's rugged geography. When the expedition reached the Goose Lake Valley, Warner decided to separate the party into two teams in order to cover more ground. Warner ordered Williamson to remain in the Goose Lake Valley while he took a small party of men to explore north and east of the valley.

Warner first headed north to Abert Lake. He then followed Captain John C. Fremont's route east into what is now the Warner Valley. He entered the valley near Mugwump Lake, and then traveled south along the west side of the valley. Warner and his men left the valley at its southern end, heading toward the Oregon–California border, which was only a short distance away. On 26 Sep 1849, Warner's party was ambushed by Indians, just south of the Oregon–California border. Reports from the survivors of the attack said that Warner was killed in the initial assault, stuck by numerous arrows. The expedition's guide, Francois Bercier, was also killed and two other members of the party were wounded.

The exact site of the attack is uncertain; however, Lieutenant Williamson's map places the location of the attack about 4 miles (6.4 km) south of the Oregon border near Eightmile Creek. In 1850, an army expedition under the command of Captain Nathaniel Lyon was sent out to recover Warner's body, but it was not found.

== Legacy ==
In the summer of 1864, Lieutenant Colonel Charles S. Drew was ordered to lead a large reconnaissance patrol east from Fort Klamath to explore southeastern Oregon. His patrol eventually reached the Goose Lake Valley and crossed what is now the Warner Mountains. When he entered the next valley, he named it Warner Valley in honor of Captain Warner, who he believed had been killed there.

In the 1860s, there were two United States Army posts in south central Oregon named after Warner. Both were called Camp Warner. Old Camp Warner was located on the east slope of Hart Mountain. After a difficult winter, the army moved the post to a new location near Honey Creek, on the west side of the Warner Valley. That outpost became known as Camp Warner. The army abandoned Camp Warner in September 1874. From 1889 until 1924, there was also a post office near the small unincorporated community of Adel, Oregon, that was named after Warner.

Today, there are a number geographic features named in honor of William Warner. The largest of these features is the Warner Mountains, a mountain range that straddles the Oregon–California border. The over 70,000-acre (283 km^{2}) South Warner Wilderness is named for this mountain range. Other geographic features in south central Oregon that bear Warner's name include Warner Valley, Warner Lakes, Warner Canyon, Warner Rim, and the over 8,000 foot (2,400 m) tall Warner Peak, which is the highest point on Hart Mountain.

In 1923 a lake freighter named William H. Warner was launched.
