= Flagstaff Lake (Oregon) =

Lake in Lake County, Oregon, United States

- Location of Flagstaff Lake in Oregon Flagstaff Lake (the United States)
- Location: Lake County, Oregon, United States
- Coordinates: 42°34′57″N 119°48′01″W
- Basin countries: United States
- Managing agency: Bureau of Land Management
- Surface area: 3,634.7 acres (1,470.9 ha)
- Shore length^{1}: 13.3 miles (21 km)
- Surface elevation: 4,465 feet (1,361 m)
- ^{1} Shore length is not a well-defined measure.

Flagstaff Lake is one of a group of interconnected, alkaline, high-desert lakes known as the Warner Lakes in the Warner Valley of Lake County in the U.S. state of Oregon. Flagstaff Lake lies between Upper Campbell Lake to the north and Swamp Lake to the south, about 40 miles (64 km) northeast of Lakeview. It has a surface area of about 3,635 acres (1,471 ha) and a shoreline of about 13 miles (21 km).

The Warner Lakes vary in depth and volume depending on the weather and have completely dried up at times. Fish populations also vary. During a drought from 1988 to 1992, when all of the lakes went dry, some fish survived by retreating into a 20-mile (32 km) slough connected to the lakes. Historically, fish species in the lakes have included crappie, brown bullhead, largemouth bass, and redband trout.

== See also ==
- List of lakes in Oregon
