= Hart Lake (Oregon) =

Lake of the United States of America

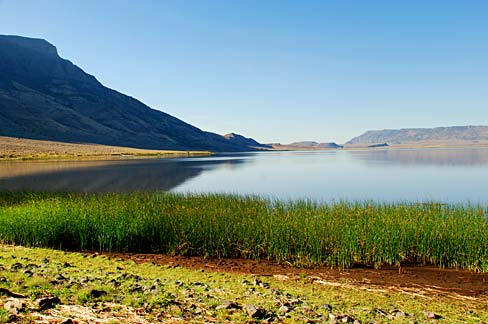
- North shore of Hart Lake

- Location within Oregon Location within the United States
- Location: Lake County, Oregon, US
- Coordinates: 42.420°N 119.845°W
- Type: Natural endorheic lake
- Primary inflows: Crump Lake overflow and Honey Creek
- Catchment area: 1,094 square miles (2,830 km^{2})
- Max. length: 6.5 mi (10.5 km)
- Max. width: 2.0 mi (3.2 km)
- Surface area: 7,324 acres (29.64 km^{2})
- Average depth: 5 ft (1.5 m)
- Max. depth: 11 ft (3.4 m)
- Water volume: 39,427 acre-feet (48,632,000 m^{3})
- Residence time: 6 months
- Shore length^{1}: 20.7 mi (33.3 km)
- Surface elevation: 4,473 ft (1,363 m)
- ^{1} Shore length is not a well-defined measure.

Hart Lake is a shallow lake in the Warner Valley of eastern Lake County, Oregon, United States. The lake covers 7,324 acres (29.64 km^{2}) and has the most stable water level within the valley's Warner Lakes chain. The lake is named for the heart-shaped brand used by the pioneer Wilson and Alexander cattle ranch established near the lake. Much of the land around Hart Lake is administered by the Bureau of Land Management (BLM) and the United States Fish and Wildlife Service (FWS). The lake and the surrounding wetlands support a wide variety of birds and other wildlife. Recreational opportunities on and near Hart Lake include hunting, fishing, bird watching, and boating.

== Geography and geology ==
Hart Lake is located in the Warner Valley in south-central Oregon. It is a natural lake that covers 7,324 acres (29.64 km^{2}) and is approximately 6.5 miles (10.5 km) long and 2 miles (3 km) wide. Annual precipitation in the Hart Lake basin averages from 15 to 25 inches (380 to 640 mm). The valley is approximately 60 miles (97 km) long and 8 miles (13 km) wide. Most of the valley is in Lake County; however, the north end extends about 10 miles (16 km) into Harney County. It is an alluvial basin containing numerous lakes, remnants of a single lake that covered the valley floor up to 200 feet (61 m) deep during the Pleistocene epoch. Today, steep cliffs rise above a chain of endorheic lakes, such as Hart Lake, known collectively as the Warner Lakes. The valley has two regions commonly referred to as the South Warner Valley and the North Warner Valley. The two areas transition between Crump Lake and Hart Lake at a point where the valley narrows to about 5 miles (8 km) in width.

=== Hydrology ===
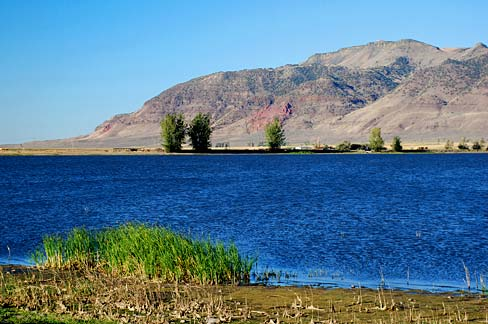
Hart Lake with Hart Mountain in the background

The entire lake has an average depth of 5 feet (1.5 m) and a maximum depth of 11 feet (3.4 m) at a normal water level. The deepest part of the lake is at its north end, while the south half is comparatively shallow. Hart Lake not only gets the overflow from Crump Lake, but also receives a steady flow of fresh water from Honey Creek. As a result, Hart Lake has the most stable water level within the Warner Lakes chain. Any outflow during high water drains into Anderson Lake, just north of Hart Lake.

The water in Hart Lake is quite murky due to suspended particles stirred up from the shallow bottom by wave action. However, water clarity is not a good indicator of the lake's trophic state. The amount of nutrients in the lake is very high; nitrate and phosphorus levels indicate a hypereutrophic condition. This is counterbalanced by the chlorophyll level and related phytoplankton growth, which are typical of a mesotrophic lake. This is due to the reduced light level in the lake's cloudy waters, so overall, the lake is classified as eutrophic, with very high turbidity.

== Ecology ==
In addition to the lake's fish population, Hart Lake provides a unique habitat for plants and animals along the shore. The west-facing slope of Hart Mountain runs along the eastern shore of the lake. This area is typical high desert scrubland dominated by big sagebrush and desert grasses. The areas to the north, south, and west of the lake are mostly meadows and marshland, where marsh grasses are common along lake shores. In addition, willow, cottonwood, choke cherry, and wild roses are found near the lake. Local wildlife includes common high desert mammals, resident birds, and migrant waterfowl.

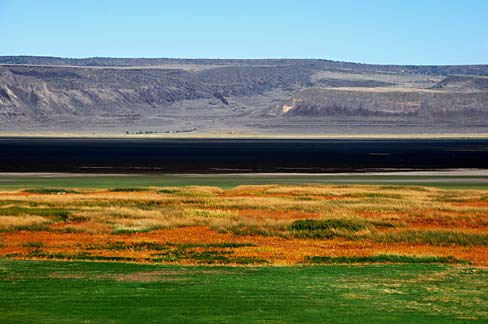
Diverse wildlife habitats surround Hart Lake.

Hart Lake's native fish species include the Warner sucker, tui chub, and Great Basin redband trout. The redband trout and small populations of the other species are also found in Honey Creek. These stream-dwelling populations have likely been the source for re-colonizing Hart Lake after extended drought killed the lake populations. In addition to the native fish, rainbow trout, crappie, smallmouth bass, and bullhead catfish have been introduced into the lake. These non-native species have put significant pressure on some of the native fish, which is why the Warner sucker is classified as threatened species. A 1996 fish survey estimated the total population of adult Warner suckers resident in Hart Lake at only 493 individuals. To help preserve and restore the lake's threatened fish populations, the Fish and Wildlife Service developed a species recovery plan in 1998.

There are 42 mammal species that live in the areas around Hart Lake. Mammals common in the Hart Lake shoreline and marshes include raccoons, striped skunks, and muskrats.

There are 264 species of birds that inhabit the area around Hart Lake or stop at the lake during migration. Species that nest near the lake include sandhill cranes, American white pelicans, double-crested cormorants, willets, Wilson's phalaropes, gadwalls, northern shovelers, American coots, western grebes, Clark's grebes, black-crowned night herons, Canada geese, mallards, and numerous other varieties of ducks and terns. In addition, white-faced ibis, great white egrets, great blue herons, and American avocets are found in the marshes and along the lake shores. Just north of Hart Lake, at the Warner Wetlands Interpretive Site, there are bird observation blinds maintained by the Bureau of Land Management where American bitterns, black-necked stilts, cinnamon teal, tundra swans, Brewer's blackbirds, western meadowlarks, nighthawks, and several swallow varieties are commonly observed.

In the meadows and marshes around Hart Lake, dusky flycatchers, yellow warblers, orange-crowned warblers, house wrens, and spotted towhees are common in the summer months. The larger birds common to the Hart Lake area include great horned owls, long-eared owls, turkey vultures, prairie falcons, red-tailed hawks, marsh hawks, golden eagles, and bald eagles.

== History ==
Native Americans used the Warner Valley's lakes and wetlands for thousands of years before the first white explorers arrived. The natives made petroglyphs along the eastern shore of Hart Lake, some of which are dated to 12,000 years ago. The Greaser Petroglyph Site, approximately 3 miles (5 km) southeast of Hart Lake, is listed on the National Register of Historic Places.

In December 1843, Captain John C. Fremont led a party of explorers through the Warner Valley. Fremont and his party spent Christmas Day camped near Hart Lake. In honor of the date, Fremont named it "Christmas Valley" and the lake "Christmas Lake". However, early mapmakers mistakenly plotted Christmas Valley 60 miles (97 km) northwest of its actual location, leaving the valley and its lakes unnamed on early maps.

In 1867, General George Crook decided to build a fort in the Warner Valley to prevent Indian raiding parties from passing through the area. To get his wagons across the wetlands, he had a bridge built across a narrow, marshy channel between Hart Lake and Crump Lake. Known as the Stone Bridge, the structure is listed on the National Register of Historic Places.

Hart Lake is named for the heart-shaped brand used by the pioneer Wilson and Alexander cattle ranch. The ranch was established in the Warner Valley near Hart Lake prior to 1878 by Henry C. Wilson and his son-in-law C.G. Alexander. Later in the 19th century, much of the private land near Hart Lake was acquired by physician Bernard Daly and became part of his "7T Ranch". By 1916, the 7T Ranch encompassed more than 7,000 acres (28 km^{2}) north and west of Hart Lake.

Beginning with the earliest pioneer ranchers, water from Honey Creek was diverted for irrigation. By the 1930s, irrigation canals had significantly reduced the flow of water into Hart Lake. In most years, the diversions did not stop the flow into the lake. However, during periods of drought, the entire flow of fresh water was diverted, visibly lowering the water level in Hart Lake. The canal structures also impeded fish migration between the lake and Honey Creek's habitat. In 1950, a dike was constructed at the north end of the lake to increase its water holding capacity.

In the late 1980s and early 1990s, the Warner Valley experienced an extended drought, reducing the water in Hart Lake to a dangerously low level. In 1992, the lake dried up completely. Before the lake water had disappeared, the Fish and Wildlife Service captured a number of Warner suckers for temporary relocation. Upon the end of the drought, the fish were reintroduced in the lake. In 1998, the FWS published a recovery plan for threatened fish species in the Warner Lakes system.

== Recreation ==
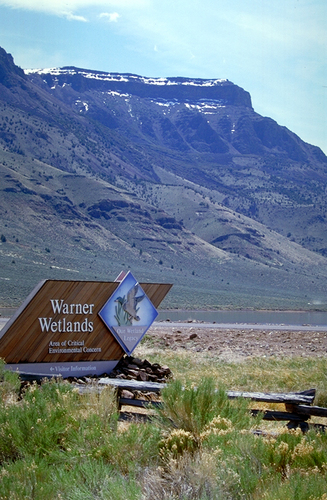
Interpretive site at Hart Bar

Most of the land to the south and east of Hart Lake is privately owned. However, the Bureau of Land Management administers the 52,033-acre (210.57 km^{2}) Warner Wetlands north of the lake. In addition, the land along the east shore is part of the Hart Mountain National Antelope Refuge, which is managed by the United States Fish and Wildlife Service. These public lands offer numerous recreational opportunities such as hunting, fishing, bird watching, boating, and camping. However, some of these activities are dependent on the water levels of the Warner Lakes, which can fluctuate dramatically.

Due to Hart Lake's stable water level, it is usually available for fishing and boating. There are no developed campgrounds near Hart Lake, although dispersed camping is allowed on BLM-administered lands adjacent to the lake. There is a day-use recreation site at the north end of Hart Lake at Hart Bar. There are also public restrooms, sheltered picnic tables, and hiking trails at the Warner Wetlands Interpretive Site, north of Hart Lake.
