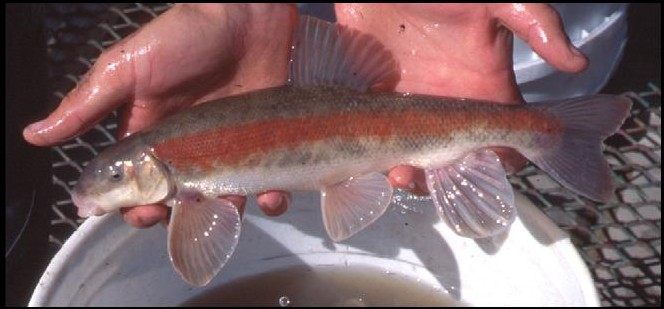

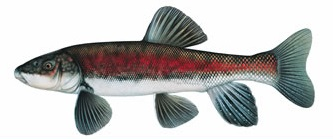

Conservation status
- Endangered (IUCN 3.1)

- Critically Imperiled (NatureServe)

Scientific classification
- Kingdom: Animalia
- Phylum: Chordata
- Class: Actinopterygii
- Order: Cypriniformes
- Family: Catostomidae
- Genus: Catostomus
- Species: C. warnerensis

Binomial name
- Catostomus warnerensis Snyder, 1908

= Warner sucker =

Species of fish

The Warner sucker (Catostomus warnerensis) is a rare species of freshwater ray-finned fish in the family Catostomidae. Native to Oregon in the United States and found only in the Warner Basin, its distribution extends just into Nevada and California. It is a federally listed threatened species. Its other common name is redhorse. The International Union for Conservation of Nature has rated this fish as an endangered species because of its small extent of occurrence, the small number of locations in which it is found, and the extreme fluctuations in area of occupancy resulting from drought and water abstraction. Conservation efforts have been put in place.

== Description ==
This sucker is up to about 15 3/4 inches (40 cm) in length. It has a dark back and sides and a white belly. The male and some females take on a bright red wash along the sides during the spawning season. The fish spawns in the creeks when they are full in the spring, as well as in canals and on lakeshores. The fish can reach the age of twenty. It becomes sexually mature at three or four.

== Distribution ==
This fish is native to shallow lakes and associated marshes and intermittent lakes and creeks in the Warner Valley of Lake County, Oregon. It has been seen in Twelvemile Creek just over the border in Nevada and West Barrel Creek within California state lines. It was historically quite abundant in the valley. There is only one metapopulation of the fish, made up of several subpopulations. There are two morphs, one that lives in the lakes and one that stays in stream habitat past spawning time. The lake-dwelling morph is generally larger in size. The stream morph may be the only one that is now experiencing recruitment.

== Status ==
Threats to the species include the many dams which have been installed in the local creeks to divert water for agriculture. These impoundments prevent fish migration and reduce the stream flows. The spawning grounds may be polluted and loaded with excessive silt. The introduced crappie (Pomoxis spp.) may be a predator on the juvenile sucker. Drought is also a current threat. The drought conditions are then made worse with increased irrigation demands on the dwindling water supply. The International Union for Conservation of Nature has rated this fish as an endangered species because of its small extent of occurrence, the small number of locations in which it is found, and the extreme fluctuations in area of occupancy resulting from changes in the amount of available habitat.

Conservation efforts include the restoration of riparian vegetation and the construction of a fishway at a dam on a major creek. Individuals have been transplanted to Summer Lake Wildlife Management Area when they were threatened by drought conditions; these fish died but not before successfully reproducing in their new habitat. Conservation activities in the area have been shown to benefit the Great Basin redband trout (Oncorhynchus mykiss newberrii) as well as the sucker.
