= Plush, Oregon =

Unincorporated community in the United States

- Census-designated place
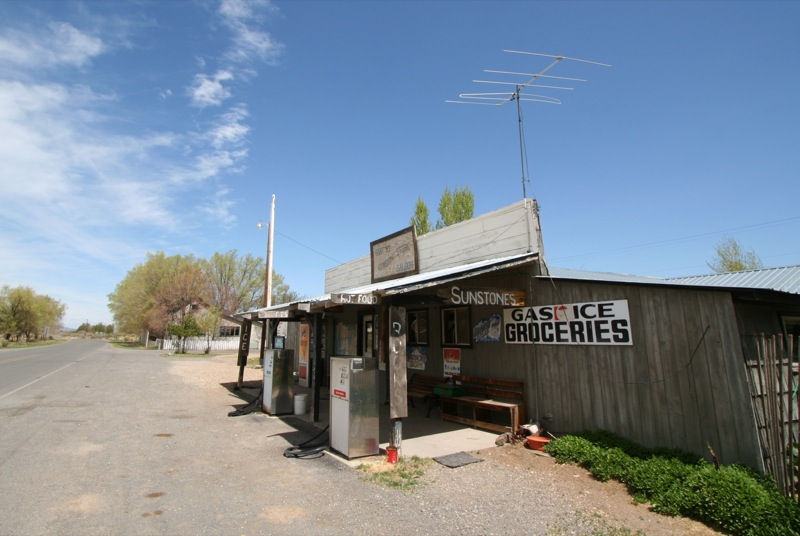
- Store in Plush in 2007

- Location within Oregon Location within the United States
- Coordinates: 42°24′18″N 119°53′58″W
- Country: United States
- State: Oregon
- County: Lake

Area
  - Total: 1.62 sq mi (4.19 km^{2})
  - Land: 1.62 sq mi (4.19 km^{2})
  - Water: 0 sq mi (0.00 km^{2})
- Elevation: 4,488 ft (1,368 m)

Population (2020)
  - Total: 39
  - Density: 24.1/sq mi (9.31/km^{2})
- Time zone: UTC-8 (Pacific (PST))
  - Summer (DST): UTC-7 (PDT)
- ZIP code: 97637
- FIPS code: 41-58550
- GNIS feature ID: 2611774

Plush is an unincorporated rural community and census-designated place in the Warner Valley of Lake County, in the U.S. state of Oregon. As of the 2020 census, Plush had a population of 39. The community is in an arid, sparsely populated part of the state 39 miles (63 km) by road northeast of Lakeview. The valley surrounding Plush contains many marshes and shallow lakes, most of them intermittent.

Frequented by Native Americans for many thousands of years, the valley became a region of sheep grazing and cattle ranching by the late 19th century. Plush's infrastructure includes a store, an elementary school, and a church. Nearby attractions include Hart Mountain National Antelope Refuge, Warner Wetlands, and the Oregon Sunstone Public Collection Area.

== History ==
People have lived in the Warner Valley for more than 10,000 years. Evidence of Native American occupation includes petroglyphs, hunting blinds, flakes from obsidian tools, and other material artifacts. By historic times, the Kidütökadö band of Northern Paiute frequented the valley and the uplands of Hart Mountain, the fault block ridge to the east.

The Euro-American settler community of Plush developed in the late 19th century around sheep grazing and small cattle ranches. Catholics from Ireland found work here as shepherds; their surnames and their churches are part of the regional heritage.

The name "Plush" is said to have derived from a mispronunciation of the word "flush" during a 19th century poker game played in the community. The Plush post office was established in 1888, and David R. Jones was the first postmaster. Daniel Boone, a relative of the famous Kentucky pathfinder of the same name, became postmaster in 1898 and opened a general store in conjunction with the post office.

== Geography ==
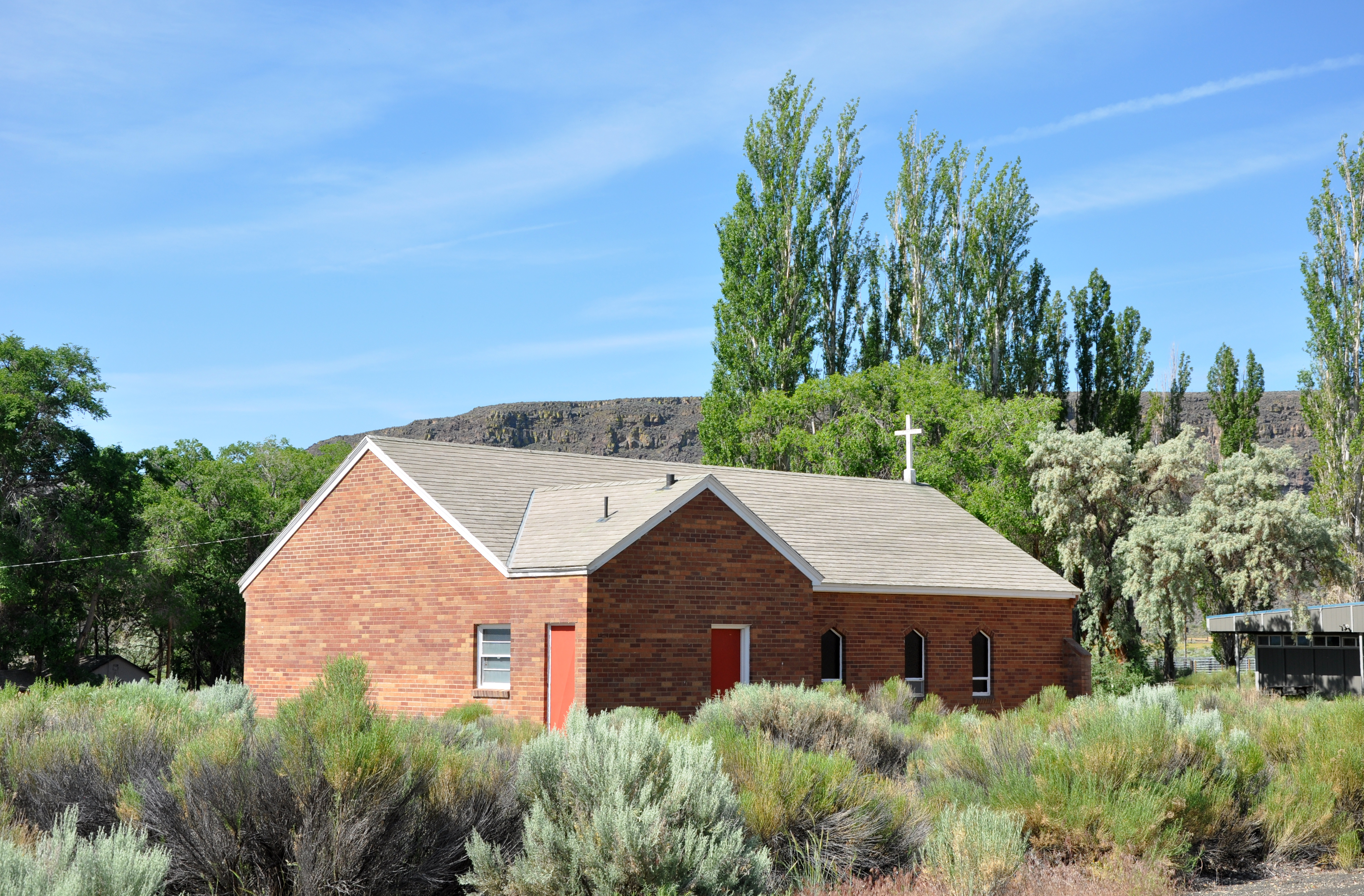
Church in Plush

By highway, Plush is about 39 miles (63 km) northeast of Lakeview and 18 miles (29 km) north of Adel in the Warner Valley of south-central Oregon. Plush–Adel Road runs north–south along the valley floor, while Plush Cutoff links Plush to Oregon Route 140 west of Adel. Hogback Road runs north from Plush, while Hart Mountain Road, which terminates in Plush, runs east and northeast to the Warner Wetlands Area of Critical Environmental Concern and the Hart Mountain National Antelope Refuge.

Hart Lake, at the base of Hart Mountain, is about 1 mile (2 km) east of the community. Honey Creek and Schneider Creek flow together and Schneider Creek then flows generally east from near the south end of Abert Rim forming a deep canyon that opens up just east of Plush and the creek continues through the north end of the town and down into the lake.

Plush is about 4,500 feet (1,400 m) above sea level, while Abert Rim reaches about 5,800 feet (1,800 m) and Hart Mountain 8,000 feet (2,400 m).

Plush is also near a large Oregon sunstone gemfield, which is partly on private land and partly on public land. The Oregon Sunstone Public Collection Area, overseen by the Bureau of Land Management, is about 25 miles (40 km) north of Plush. It allows amateur geologists (rockhounds) to remove sunstones—feldspar crystals that formed in lava beds over the past 13 to 14 million years. Sunstone is the Oregon state gemstone.

== Demographics ==
Historical population
Census	Pop.	Note	%±
2020	39		—
U.S. Decennial Census

== Climate ==
According to the Köppen Climate Classification system, Plush has a semi-arid climate, abbreviated "BSk" on climate maps. On average, about 7 inches (180 mm) of precipitation falls on Plush each year. July is the warmest month with an average high temperature of about 87 °F (31 °C). January is the coldest, when low temperatures average about 20 °F (−7 °C).

== Education ==
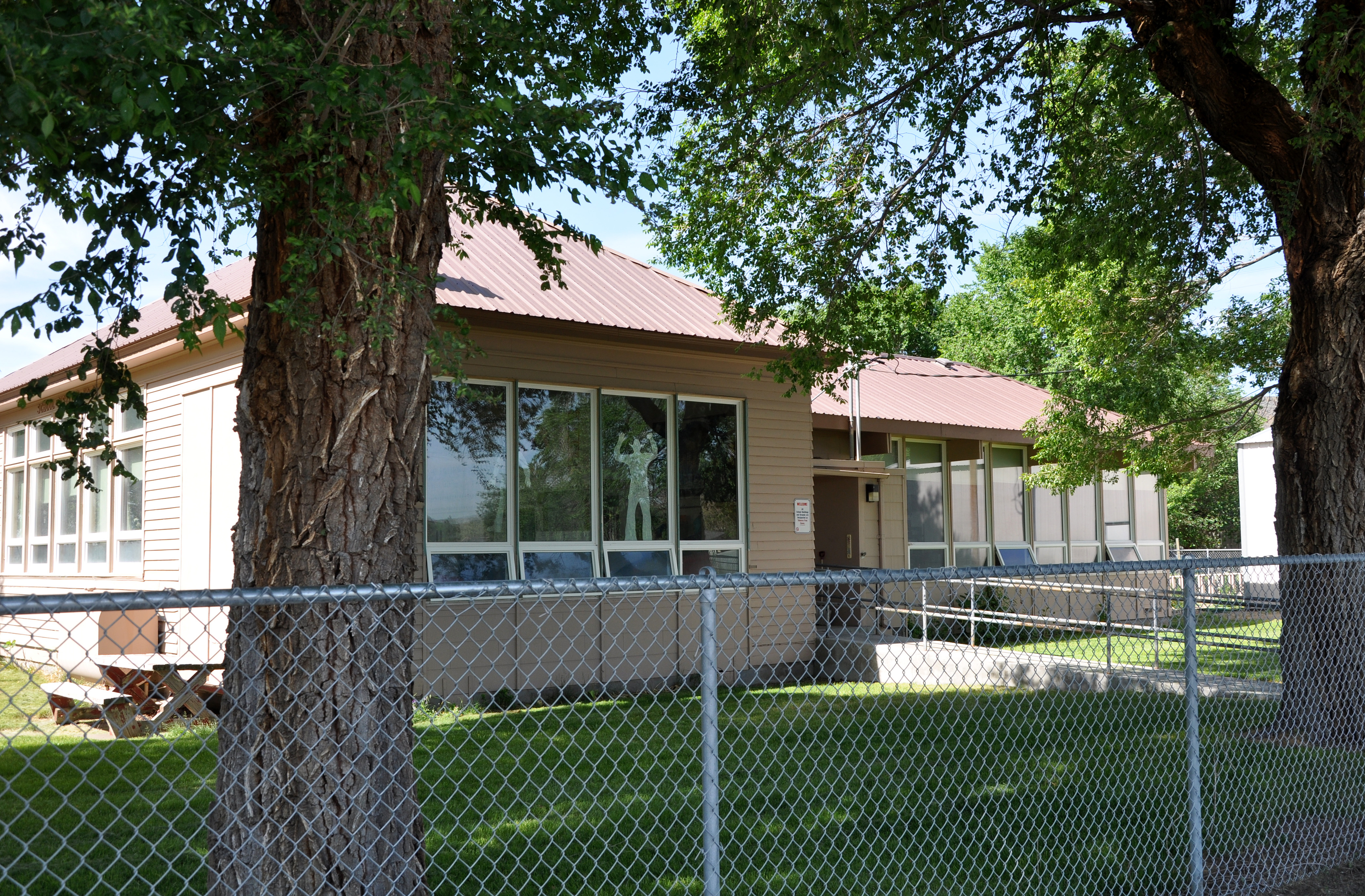
Plush School in 2015

Plush School District 18 is one of five school districts making up the Lake County Education Service District. Plush School, grades K–3, shares students with Adel School District 21, grades 4–8. The two schools combined have about a dozen students. For grades 9–12, the students generally attend Lakeview High School or Paisley School.

In 1969 the Plush school had nine students.

The portion of the county the community is in is not in any community college district, but the county has a "contract-out-of-district" (COD) with Klamath Community College.

== See also ==
- Antelope Hot Springs, also known as Hart Mountain Hot Springs
