= Warner Valley =

Valley in south-central Oregon

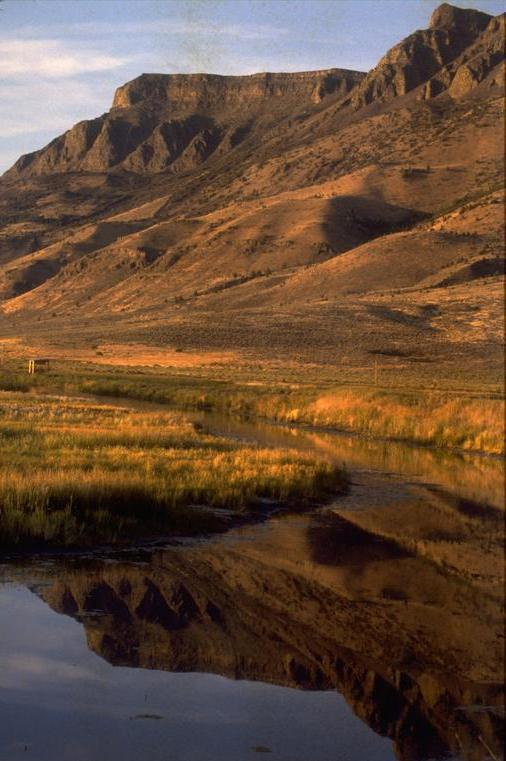
- Hart Mountain overlooking the Warner Wetlands

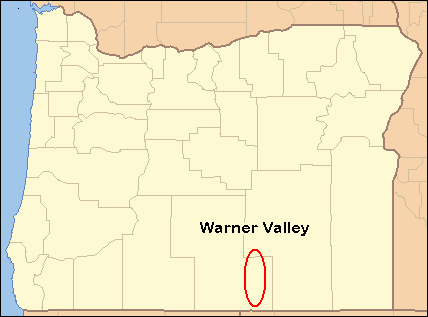

Geography
- Location: Lake County, Oregon
- Borders on: Hart Mountain (east); Warner Mountains (west)
- Coordinates: 42.0777°N 119.925°W

The Warner Valley is a valley in south-central Oregon in the United States. It is a remote valley at the northwestern corner of North America's Basin and Range Province. The valley is home to a chain of lakes and wetlands known as the Warner Lakes. Native Americans were present in the Warner Valley for thousands of years before European explorers arrived in the 19th century. It is the site of Fort Warner, built by the United States Army in 1867. The fort was used as a supply depot and administrative headquarters during a protracted Army campaign against Northern Paiute bands in eastern Oregon and northern California. Today, livestock ranching is the main commercial activity in the valley. The Warner Valley offers a number of recreational opportunities including hunting, fishing, bird watching, and wildlife viewing.

== Geography ==
The Warner Valley is located in south-central Oregon. It is approximately 60 miles (97 km) long and 8 miles (13 km) wide. Most of the valley is in Lake County; however, the north end of the valley extends about 10 miles (16 km) into Harney County. The valley has two regions commonly referred to as the South Warner Valley and the North Warner Valley. The two areas transition between Crump Lake and Hart Lake at a point where the valley narrows to about 5 miles (8.0 km) in width.

Both sides of the South Warner Valley have steep cliffs rising from 1,000 to 2,000 feet (300 to 610 m) above the valley floor. The eastern cliffs run the entire length of the valley, while the western wall turns into rolling hills at the north end of the valley. The Coyote Hills are the western boundary through the middle of the North Warner Valley, with the Rabbit Hills bounding the northwest corner of the valley. From the hills, the ground slopes up to the crest of Abert Rim. The eastern boundary of the valley is Hart Mountain, a massive cliff face that rises 3,600 feet (1,100 m) above the valley floor. Warner Peak is the highest point on Hart Mountain. The summit is 8,065 feet (2,458 m) above sea level.

The valley floor is occupied by a chain of lakes known collectively as the Warner Lakes. The entire valley was once covered by a single vast lake; however, the water level gradually receded, leaving a chain of lakes at the low spots with marshland between the lakes. Starting at the south end of the valley, the largest of the Warner Lakes are Pelican Lake, Crump Lake, Hart Lake, Anderson Lake, Swamp Lake, Mugwump Lake, Flagstaff Lake, Upper Campbell Lake, Lower Campbell Lake, Stone Corral Lake, Turpin Lake, and Bluejoint Lake. Because the valley slopes away to the north, Crump Lake is 12 feet (3.7 m) higher in elevation than Bluejoint Lake.

== Geology ==
The country to the north and east of the Warner Valley is a high volcanic plateau which has undergone considerable erosion. The Warner Valley was probably a similar high plateau before massive faulting dropped the valley floor and uplifted the land around it, forming high valley walls. The Warner Lakes formed in the valley bottom after the faulting stopped.

The Warner Valley is bounded by high escarpment walls on the east and west. The main line of perpendicular displacement is along the foot of the cliffs to the east of the Warner Lakes. This scarp feature is known as Hart Mountain. The main cliff face of Hart Mountain towers 3,600 feet (1,100 m) above the valley floor. It runs the length of the valley, eventually being lost in a series of smaller fault scarps at the north end of the valley. These smaller scarps generally run from the east side of the valley to the northwest. The south end of the valley is more complex. In that area, the valley floor is bounded on three sides by perpendicular cliffs from 1,500 to 2,000 feet (460 to 610 m) high, the result of numerous fault events. These cliffs expose hundreds of feet of Miocene and Oligocene lava flows and ignimbrites, which include Steens basalt and various andesite, trachyandesite, and tuff flows. The mountain mass forming the western border of the South Warner Valley is a steep fault scarp. This cliff face rises over 2,000 feet (610 m) above the valley floor.

Warner Valley is an alluvial basin containing numerous lakes, remnants of a single great lake that covered the valley floor up to a depth of 200 feet (61 m) during the Pleistocene epoch. Today, steep cliffs rise above a chain of endorheic lakes.

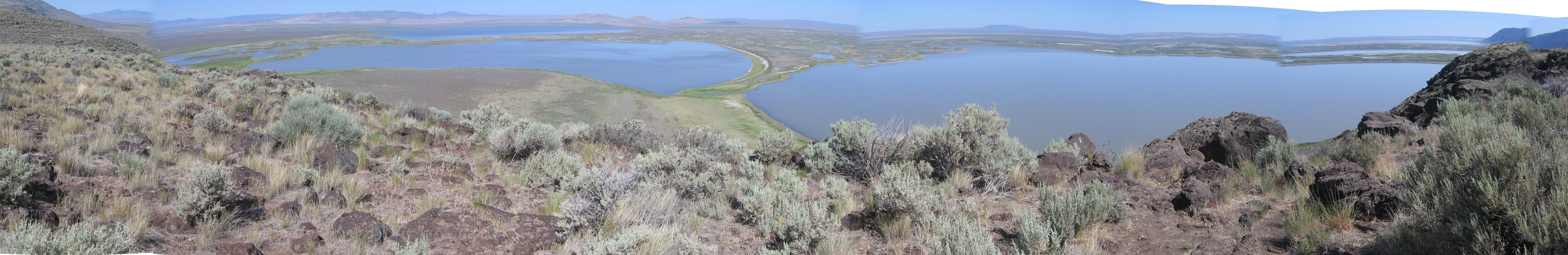
View of the Warner Valley looking west from Hart Mountain
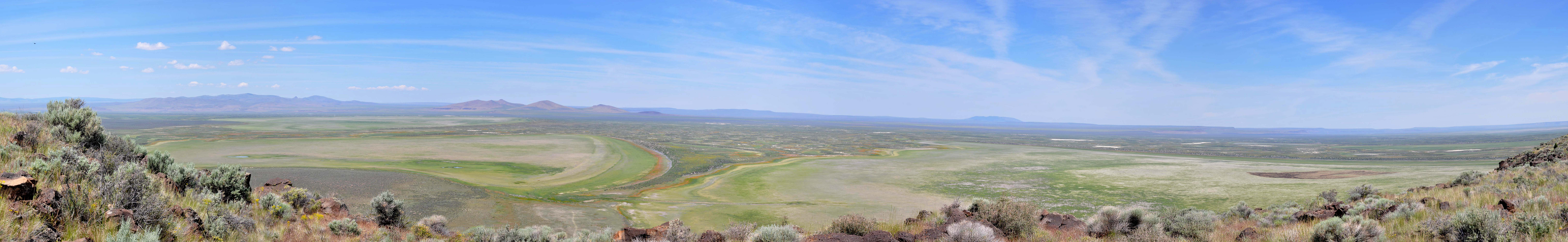
The same view during low water in June 2015. Upper Campbell Lake is to the left, Campbell Lake to the right.

== Climate ==
The climate in the Warner Valley is typical of the high desert country of south-central Oregon. However, the high escarpments forming the western wall of the South Warner Valley tend to protect the southern part of the valley from the prevailing westerly winds. The absence of a high rim along much of the North Warner Valley increases the harshness of the fall and winter seasons at the north end of the valley.

Air movements brought about by the uneven temperatures in the valley and on the surrounding higher plateaus and mountains give rise to local winds. These winds are strongest at places where canyons, such as Deep Creek Canyon, open into the valley.

In the Warner Valley, frost is common until late spring and begins again in early fall. As a result, the growing season in the valley is limited to about 100 days. The Warner Valley gets most of its rain in May and June, while the summer and fall months tend to be very dry. The winter snowfall in the valley bottom is generally very light; however, winter temperatures can get very cold. The higher plateau country above the valley usually gets several feet of snow and the higher peaks can get much more. In most years, the high peaks have snow on them from early fall until mid-summer. This snowpack feeds the streams that drain into the valley.

== Ecology ==
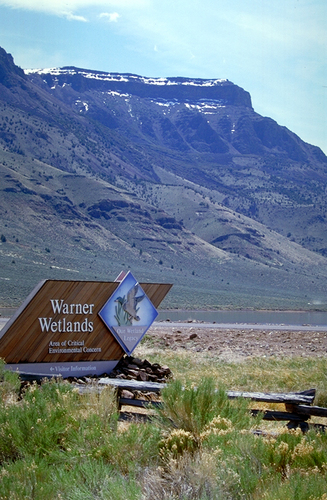
Warner Wetlands Interpretive Site

The Warner Valley provides a number of unique animal habitats. These include lake, marsh, riparian, grasslands, sage steppe, dry forest, and rimrock. They range in elevation from approximately 4,500 feet (1,400 m) above sea level at the valley floor to over 8,000 feet (2,400 m) at the summit of Warner Peak. Marsh grasses are common along the lake shores. In the riparian areas, wild roses, choke cherry, wild plum, cottonwood, and willow are found. Beyond the wetlands, the valley becomes quite dry. Much of the North Warner Valley is semi-desert, where dwarf sagebrush, greasewood, and Western Juniper are the dominant vegetation.

The valley’s wildlife includes common high desert mammal species, resident birds, and migrant waterfowl. There are forty-two mammal species that live in the Warner Valley-Hart Mountain area. These include pronghorn, bighorn sheep, elk, mule deer, cougar, bobcat, and coyotes. Smaller mammals include jackrabbits, ground squirrels, and chipmunks.

There are 239 species of birds that live in the area or migrate through the Warner Valley. Species that nest in the areas around Crump Lake and Hart Lake include American white pelicans, double-crested cormorants, willets, Wilson's phalaropes, Canada geese, gadwalls, northern shovelers, black-crowned night herons, and numerous varieties of ducks and terns. In addition, sandhill cranes, white-faced ibis, great white egrets, and American avocets are found in the marshes and along the lake shores. At the Warner Wetlands Area of Critical Environmental Concern, administered by the Bureau of Land Management, there are observation blinds where American bitterns, black-necked stilts, cinnamon teal, tundra swans, Brewer's blackbirds, western meadowlarks, swallows, and nighthawks are commonly seen.

In the valley’s riparian areas, dusky flycatchers, yellow warblers, orange-crowned warblers, house wrens, and spotted towhees are common in the summer months. In the sage steppes and grasslands, summer residents include horned larks, Brewer's sparrows, vesper sparrows, common ravens, sage thrashers, sagebrush sparrows, black-throated sparrows, and greater sage grouse. In the rimrock areas, there are chukars, rock wrens, canyon wrens, cliff swallows, and barn swallows. The valley also hosts mountain chickadees, Cassin's finches, black-headed grosbeaks, green-tailed towhees, yellow-rumped warblers, MacGillivray's warblers, mountain bluebirds, white-headed woodpeckers, and flammulated owls. The larger birds include great horned owls, long-eared owls, prairie falcons, golden eagles, and bald eagles.

== History ==
Native Americans used the Warner Valley for thousands of years before the first Europeans arrived. The valley has scores of petroglyphs, some estimated to be 12,000 years old. The Greaser Petroglyph Site, in the South Warner Valley, is listed on the National Register of Historic Places.

The first European explorer to enter the valley was probably John Work, who headed a Hudson's Bay Company trapping expedition in 1832. While it is not certain that he visited the valley, he was in the area and left a description of a "valley of lakes" that correspond closely to the Warner Valley. The next explorer to arrive in the valley was Captain John C. Fremont, who led a party through the valley in December 1843. Fremont named it Christmas Valley since his party spent Christmas Day camped near Hart Lake. However, early mapmakers mistakenly sited Christmas Valley at another location 60 miles (97 km) northwest of the Warner Valley, leaving the valley unnamed on an early map.

In 1849, the valley was explored by Captain William H. Warner, an Army topographical engineer. On 26 September 1849, Warner was ambushed and killed by Indians just south of the Warner Valley. In 1864, Lieutenant Colonel C. S. Drew of the 1st Oregon Cavalry visited the valley while on a long-range reconnaissance patrol. Drew named the valley in honor of Warner, who he believed had been killed there.

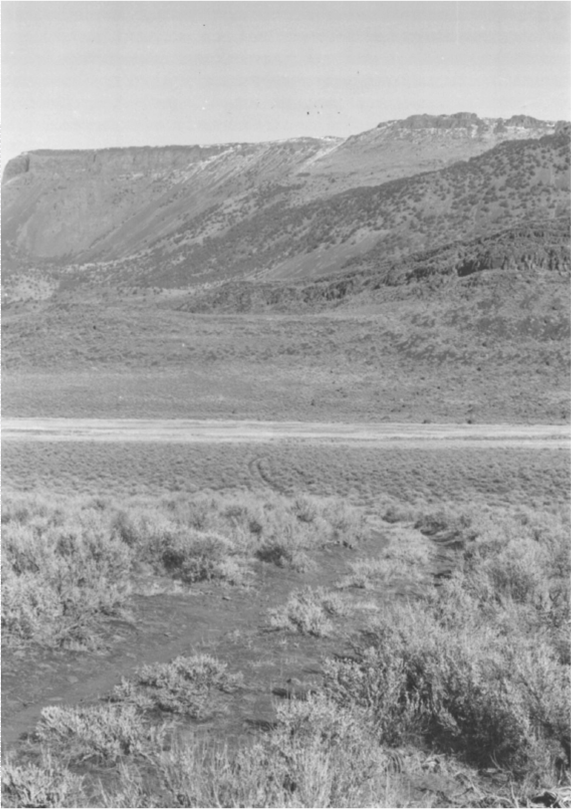
Oregon Central Military Wagon Road

In 1865, the Army decided it needed a fort in the Warner Valley to facilitate the interdiction of Indian raiding parties passing through the area. Army scouts selected a site along Honey Creek on the west side of the Warner Lakes. In 1866, a detachment from Fort Boise was sent to establish the fort. The soldiers arrived on the east side of the lakes in late summer. Unable to cross the chain of lakes and marshes, the soldiers built a winter camp on the east side of the lakes. The camp was sited poorly and the men had a very difficult winter. In February 1867, General George Crook visited the Warner Valley outpost. Crook directed that the camp be moved to the Honey Creek site west of the lakes. To get the Army’s wagons across the wetlands, Crook ordered the construction of a bridge across the narrow channel between Hart Lake and Crump Lake. Shortly after the bridge was begun a second detachment was sent ahead to build the new fort. The Stone Bridge was completed that summer and the soldiers moved into the new camp, which was named Fort Warner. By 1869, the Indian raids in south-central Oregon had ended and a treaty had been signed. With no Indian raiders left in the area, Fort Warner was abandoned in 1874. While nothing remains of Fort Warner, the Stone Bridge the Army built to cross the Warner wetlands still exists. The bridge is now listed on the National Register of Historic Places.

In 1865, the United States Congress authorized the construction of the Oregon Central Military Wagon Road from Eugene, Oregon, to Fort Boise in Idaho. Congress allowed the construction company to claim three sections of land for every mile of road built. As a result, road surveyors laid out a route designed to pass through as much well-watered, desirable land as possible. The route of the military road came through the Warner Valley, crossing over the Warner Lakes at the Stone Bridge before passing south of Hart Mountain through what is today the Hart Mountain National Antelope Refuge and heading east.

In reality, the Oregon Central Military Wagon Road was a venture designed to acquire public lands at little or no cost to the road company’s investors. Nevertheless, the construction company was able to secure thousands of acres of valuable grazing land in the Warner Valley. Legal disputes kept the ownership of these lands in question for decades, preventing settlers from claiming land grants for farms and ranches. Ownership was finally decided by the United States Supreme Court in a case known as the United States versus the California and Oregon Land Company. Eventually, the land passed into the hands of the Oregon Valley Land Company, which subdivided it into lots and parcels. The property was sold in a nationally advertised auction held in Lakeview, Oregon in 1909.

Settlement did not occur in the Warner Valley until the latter part of the 19th century. For example, the land occupied by Fort Warner was homesteaded by John H. Dent in 1889. The Plush, Oregon post office was opened on 18 July 1888. Its first postmaster was David R. Jones. The Adel post office was opened in 1896.

== Human activity ==
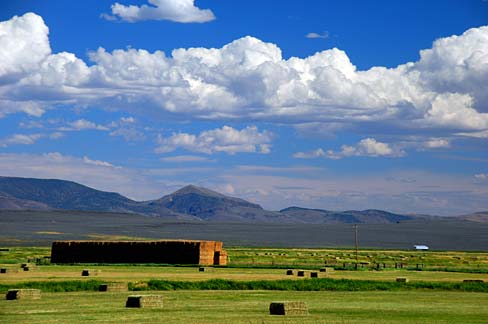
Hay stacks in fields south of Adel

Today, agriculture is the primary source of income in the Warner Valley. Most of the private land in the valley is used for cattle ranching. Crops are generally used for winter feed. Because of the short growing season, the valley’s principal crops are wild hay, alfalfa, clover, and timothy-grass. Grains such as wheat, oats, rye, and barley can also be grown in the Warner Valley. Three crops of alfalfa per season can be raised over much of the South Warner Valley, while the less favorable climate in the North Warner Valley makes one or two crops the norm.

Much of the valley is public land administered by the Bureau of Land Management. These public lands offer numerous recreational opportunities including hunting, fishing, bird watching, wildlife viewing, boating, and camping. However, some of these activities are dependent on the water level of the Warner Lakes, which can fluctuate dramatically. Crappie, smallmouth bass, and bullhead catfish are common in the lakes while trout including Great Basin redband trout are found in Twentymile Creek, Deep Creek, and Honey Creek. There are no developed campgrounds in the valley; however, dispersed camping is allowed on land administered by the Bureau of Land Management. There are public restrooms, sheltered picnic tables, and hiking trails at the Bureau of Land Management's Warner Wetlands Interpretive Site at Hart Bar.

== Communities ==
There are no incorporated cities in Warner Valley. The nearest city is Lakeview, the county seat of Lake County.

- Adel is an unincorporated community in the South Warner Valley.
- Plush is an unincorporated community in the North Warner Valley.

== See also ==
- William Kittredge, former resident and author
