= Greaser Petroglyph Site =

- U.S. National Register of Historic Places
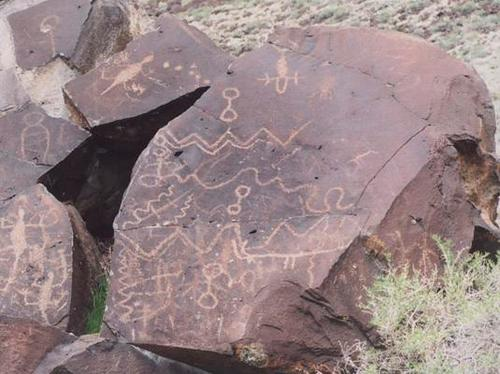
- Greaser Canyon petroglyphs

- Location within Oregon Location within the United States
- Location: Warner Valley, Lake County, Oregon, USA
- Nearest city: Lakeview, Oregon, USA
- Coordinates: 42°10′57″N 119°48′29″W
- Built: Unknown
- Architectural style: Prehistoric rock art
- NRHP reference No.: 74002293
- Added to NRHP: 1974

The Greaser Petroglyph Site is located on land managed by the Bureau of Land Management in eastern Lake County, Oregon. The designs were scraped into a basalt boulder by Native Americans perhaps 12,000 years ago. No one knows the meaning of the designs. Because of its unique archaeological and cultural significance, the Greaser Petroglyph Site was listed on the National Register of Historic Places in 1974.

== Prehistoric art ==
Native Americans have lived in southeastern Oregon for at least 15,000 years, according to a 2012 find in the Paisley Caves. At that time, pluvial lakes filled many of the high desert basins. Little is known about the people who occupied the land at that time, except that they camped and hunted near the lakes. The earliest petroglyphs in southeastern Oregon may be as much as 15,000 years old or much older.

In 1840, when the first white men came through southern Oregon, the Fort Bidwell Band and the Harney Valley Band of the Northern Paiute tribe lived in the southeastern part of Oregon around Greaser Canyon. However, given the age of the carvings, it is possible that the Northern Paiute people had nothing to do with their creation.

The meanings of the Greaser petroglyphs are not known. They may have been used in religious ceremonies or marked tribal ownership of territory. The designs may have been map directions or simply art created to tell a personal story. No one knows.

== Protection ==
Because prehistoric petroglyph sites have great archaeological value and are often associated with Native American cultural practices, they are identified for protection when located on federal lands. A majority of the government-owned petroglyph sites have been officially designated as "Areas of Critical Environmental Concern". This ensures maximum protection and careful preservation of these valuable cultural resources. There are also some sites of unique importance to the study of prehistory or of particularly cultural significance that have been listed on the National Register of Historic Places. Because of its cultural significance and unique archaeological value, the Greaser Petroglyph Site was listed on the National Register of Historic Places on 20 November 1974.

The Greaser petroglyphs were vandalized at least once. However, Bureau of Land Management archaeologists were able to repair the damage. Today, a sign warns visitors that altering the petroglyph designs in any way is a violation of federal law and can ruin the works.

== Location ==
The Greaser Petroglyph Site is located 28 miles (45 km) east of Lakeview, Oregon. The site is in the Warner Valley near Greaser Canyon, 5 miles (8.0 km) east of the unincorporated community of Adel. The petroglyphs are carved on a southwest-facing basalt boulder, approximately 1/2 mile (0.80 km) north of Oregon Route 140. The protected area around the petroglyphs covers 9 acres (3.6 ha) of open rangeland owned by the Bureau of Land Management.
