= Warner Canyon =

Ski area in Oregon, United States

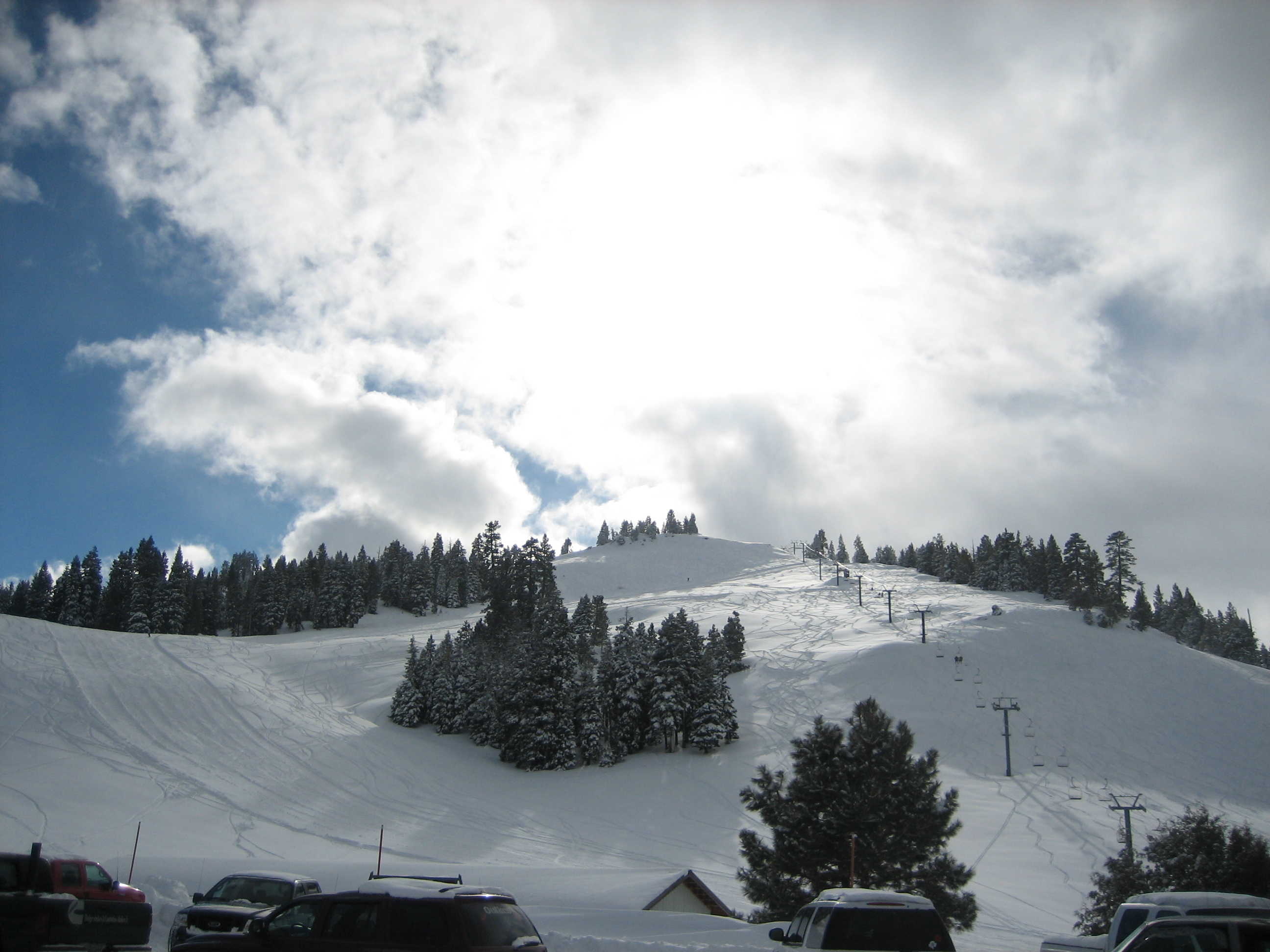
- Main run at Warner Canyon

- Location in Oregon Warner Canyon (the United States)
- Location: Lake County, Oregon, US
- Nearest city: Lakeview 9 miles (14 km) west
- Coordinates: 42.23749°N 120.29583°W
- Vertical: 780
- Top elevation: 6,683 feet (2,037 m)
- Base elevation: 5,683 feet (1,732 m)
- Skiable area: 300 acres (120 ha)
- Trails: 22
- Longest run: 1 mile (1.6 km)
- Lift system: 1 chairlift
- Snowfall: 150 inches (3,800 mm)
- Website: https://www.warnercanyonski.com/

Warner Canyon is a small ski area in the U.S. state of Oregon. It is located in the Warner Mountains of south-central Oregon. Operating since 1938, the ski area was once within the Fremont National Forest, but the land is now owned by Lake County; a land swap was completed between the USFS and Lake County in 1998.

It is located 4 miles (6.4 km) northeast of Lakeview, a driving distance of 9.4 miles (15.1 km). There is one triple chairlift serving the hill, with two landings. The total vertical drop is 780 feet (240 m). The area is operated by a local non-profit, the Fremont Highlanders Ski Club.
