= Adel, Oregon =

Unincorporated community in the state of Oregon, United States

- Unincorporated community
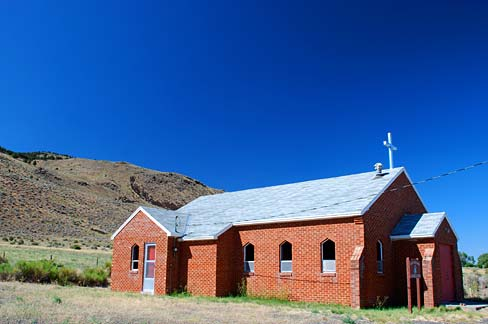
- Saint Richard Catholic Church in Adel

- Location within Oregon Location within the United States
- Coordinates: 42°10′39″N 119°53′55″W
- Country: United States
- State: Oregon
- County: Lake
- Elevation: 4,547 ft (1,386 m)
- Time zone: UTC-8 (Pacific)
  - Summer (DST): UTC-7 (Pacific)
- Zip Code: 97620
- GNIS feature ID: 1116775

Adel is an unincorporated community in southeastern Lake County, in the U.S. state of Oregon. The community is in an arid, sparsely populated part of the state, along Oregon Route 140, about 30 miles (48 km) east of Lakeview. The Warner Valley surrounding Adel contains many marshes and shallow lakes, most of them intermittent.

Frequented by Native Americans for many thousands of years, the valley became a region of sheep grazing and cattle ranching by the late 19th century. Adel's infrastructure includes a combined store/restaurant/bar, a post office, an elementary school, and a church. Hot springs and related geological features have made one of the nearby ranches a potential site for a geothermal power station.

== History ==
People have lived in the Warner Valley for more than 10,000 years. Evidence of Native American occupation includes petroglyphs, hunting blinds, flakes from obsidian tools, and other material artifacts. By historic times, the Kidütökadö band of Northern Paiute frequented the valley and the uplands of Hart Mountain, the fault block ridge to the east.

The Euro-American settler community of Adel developed in the late 19th century around sheep grazing and small cattle ranches. Catholics from Ireland found work here as shepherds; their surnames and their churches are part of the regional heritage. A stagecoach line connected early Adel to Fort Bidwell in northern California and offered transportation three times a week. J. J. Monroe owned the Adel store.

The Adel post office was established in 1896 and was either named for a former sweetheart of the owner of the land on which it was established or for a local cow, Leda, but with the spelling reversed. Mail service at that time was limited to three days a week.

Crump Lake, immediately north of Adel, is named after Thomas Crump (1854–1939), who settled here in the 1890s. The lake, toward the southern end of a north–south chain of marshes and mainly intermittent lakes, covers about 8,500 acres (3,400 ha) with a shoreline of about 70 miles (110 km).

In 1959, two days after the Nevada Thermal Power Company drilled a well on the Crump family property, a continuous geyser of steam and hot water began shooting 150 feet (46 m) into the air. However, during the 1960s the Crump Geyser became plugged with rocks, though it continued to emit steam. In the 21st century, the site's geoelectric potential makes it a candidate for a power station. The state's first geothermal plant began operation at the Oregon Institute of Technology in Klamath Falls in 2010. Another went online near Vale in 2012 and another, near Paisley, in 2014.

== Geography ==
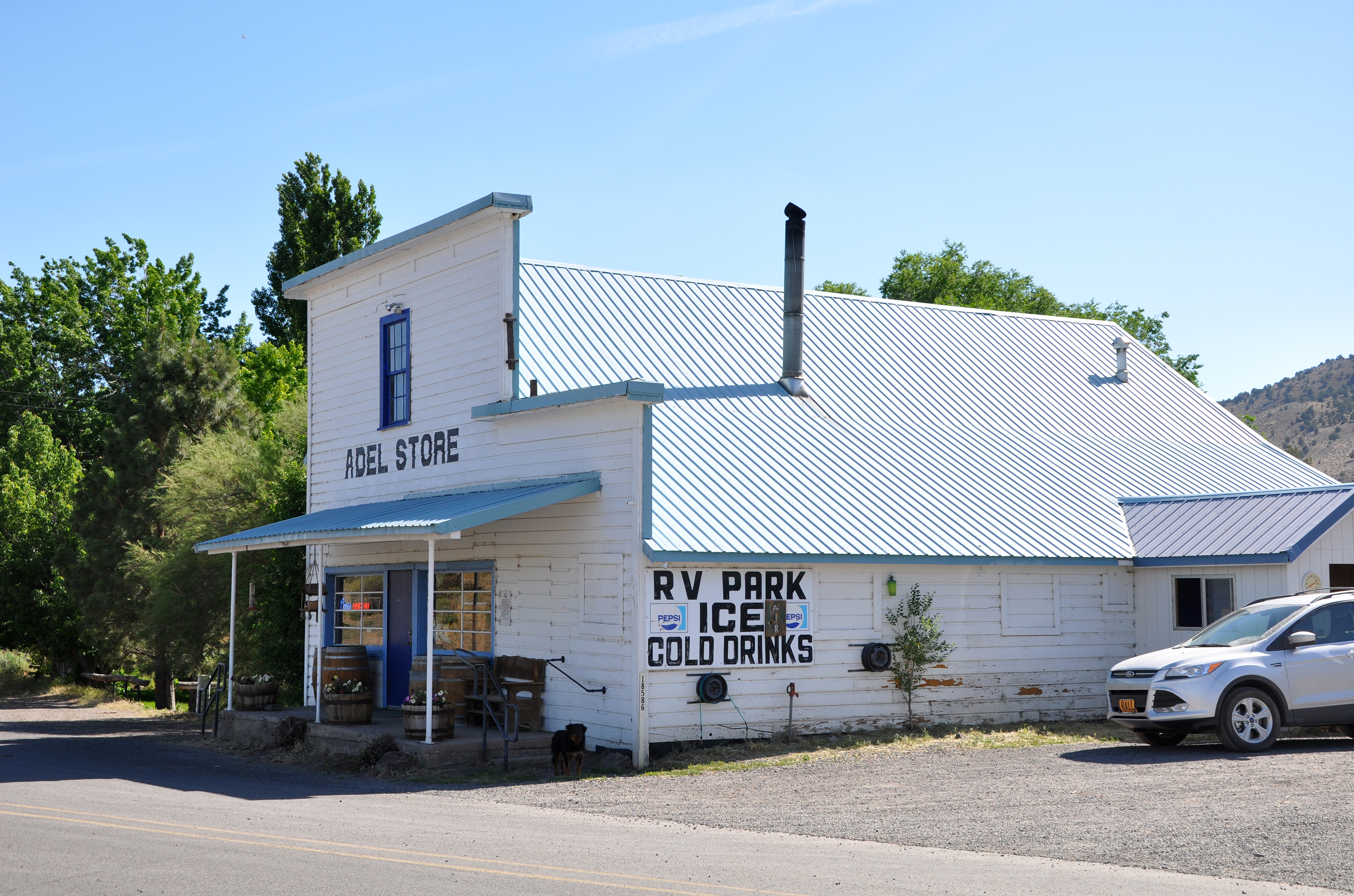
Adel Store, at the north end of Twentymile Road

Adel lies along Oregon Route 140 about 30 miles (48 km) east of Lakeview in south-central Oregon. From its intersection with the main highway, Plush–Adel Road runs north along the western shore of Crump and Hart lakes in the Warner Valley while Twentymile Road runs south from Adel to northern California just west of that state's border with Nevada. Deep Creek, flowing east from the Warner Mountains, passes through Adel into marshlands and Pelican Lake before entering Crump Lake.

Adel is 4,547 feet (1,386 m) above sea level. To the northeast, the Hart Mountain ridge rises to 8,017 feet (2,444 m).

The region is moderately geologically active with a retired geyser and several hot springs. Geothermal exploration at the 7,200-acre (2,900 ha) Crump Geyser site in 2010 found hot springs with temperatures as high as 172 °F (78 °C), two shallow wells with temperatures to 248 °F (120 °C), and a parent source of up to 302 °F (150 °C).

== Climate ==
This climatic region is typified by large seasonal temperature differences, with warm to hot (and often humid) summers and cold (sometimes severely cold) winters. According to the Köppen Climate Classification system, Adel has a steppe climate, abbreviated "BSk" on climate maps.

Total annual precipitation in Adel averages about 9 inches (230 mm). The warmest month is July, with an average maximum temperature of 88 °F (31 °C). The coldest months are December and January, when the average lows are about 22 °F (−6 °C).

Climate data for Adel, Oregon, 1981–2010 normals, extremes 1956–present
Month	Jan	Feb	Mar	Apr	May	Jun	Jul	Aug	Sep	Oct	Nov	Dec	Year
Record high °F (°C)	64 (18)	71 (22)	77 (25)	89 (32)	98 (37)	108 (42)	107 (42)	104 (40)	101 (38)	93 (34)	77 (25)	67 (19)	108 (42)
Mean maximum °F (°C)	55.2 (12.9)	58.7 (14.8)	66.9 (19.4)	74.7 (23.7)	83.6 (28.7)	90.2 (32.3)	96.9 (36.1)	97.6 (36.4)	90.9 (32.7)	80.6 (27.0)	66.1 (18.9)	53.6 (12.0)	99.0 (37.2)
Mean daily maximum °F (°C)	42.4 (5.8)	45.8 (7.7)	53.3 (11.8)	60.7 (15.9)	69.6 (20.9)	77.5 (25.3)	88.5 (31.4)	88.5 (31.4)	79.3 (26.3)	66.3 (19.1)	49.6 (9.8)	41.2 (5.1)	63.6 (17.5)
Daily mean °F (°C)	32.1 (0.1)	34.3 (1.3)	40.7 (4.8)	46.7 (8.2)	54.4 (12.4)	61.2 (16.2)	70.5 (21.4)	69.7 (20.9)	60.8 (16.0)	50.6 (10.3)	37.8 (3.2)	31.1 (−0.5)	49.2 (9.5)
Mean daily minimum °F (°C)	21.8 (−5.7)	22.7 (−5.2)	28.1 (−2.2)	32.7 (0.4)	39.1 (3.9)	44.8 (7.1)	52.4 (11.3)	50.8 (10.4)	42.2 (5.7)	34.9 (1.6)	26.0 (−3.3)	21.0 (−6.1)	34.7 (1.5)
Mean minimum °F (°C)	6.4 (−14.2)	8.9 (−12.8)	15.8 (−9.0)	23.0 (−5.0)	29.4 (−1.4)	36.1 (2.3)	44.6 (7.0)	43.8 (6.6)	33.4 (0.8)	21.6 (−5.8)	12.1 (−11.1)	5.4 (−14.8)	0.1 (−17.7)
Record low °F (°C)	−12 (−24)	−24 (−31)	−4 (−20)	13 (−11)	18 (−8)	29 (−2)	34 (1)	31 (−1)	20 (−7)	6 (−14)	−7 (−22)	−24 (−31)	−24 (−31)
Average precipitation inches (mm)	0.70 (18)	0.95 (24)	0.80 (20)	0.97 (25)	1.05 (27)	0.65 (17)	0.71 (18)	0.27 (6.9)	0.47 (12)	0.80 (20)	1.20 (30)	1.25 (32)	9.82 (249.9)
Average precipitation days (≥ 0.01 in)	5.8	6.3	6.5	6.1	6.0	4.0	1.6	1.2	2.2	4.3	7.0	6.8	57.8
Source 1: NOAA
Source 2: National Weather Service (mean maxima/minima 1991–2020)

== Education ==
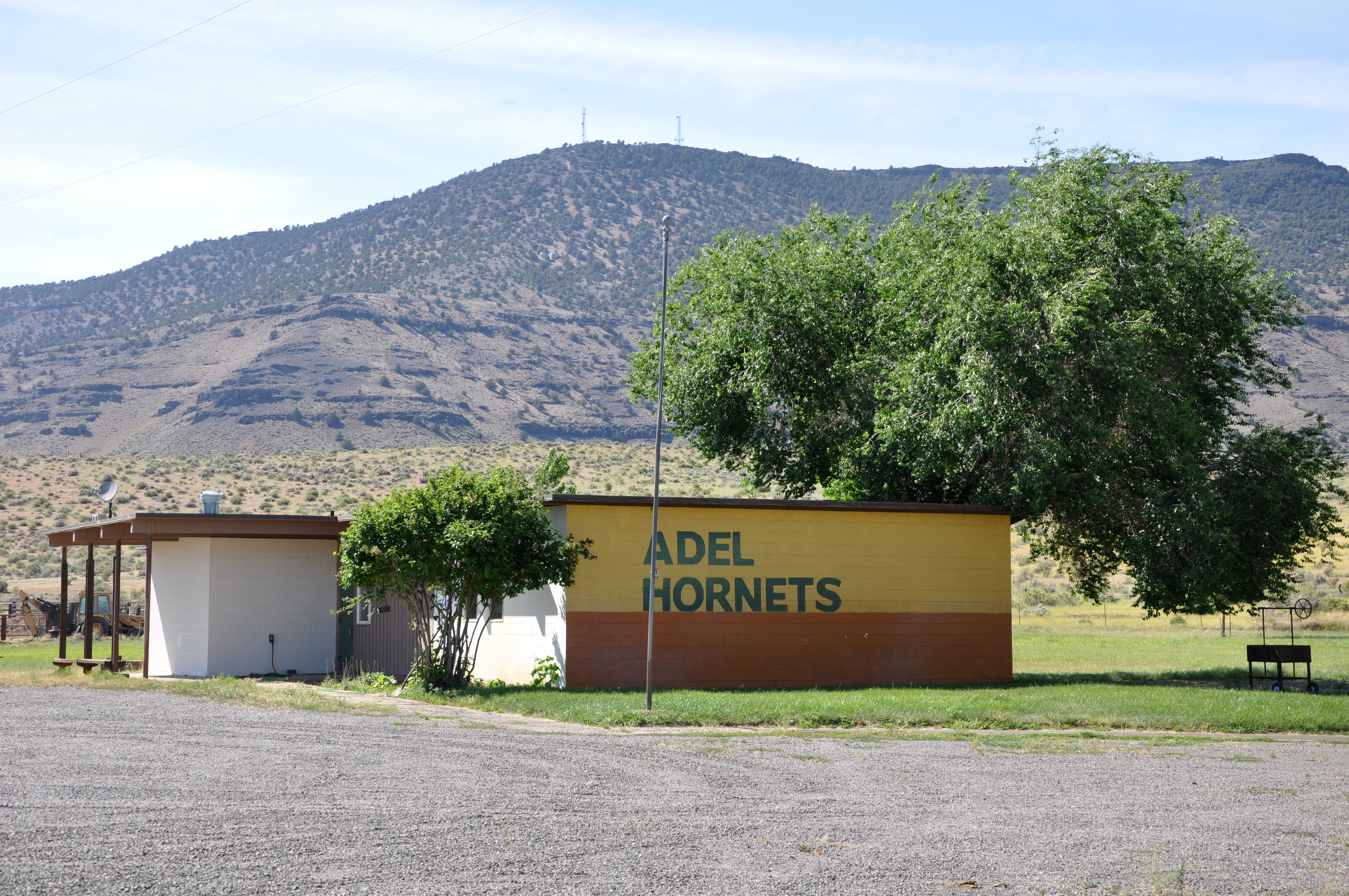
Adel School in 2015

Adel School District 21 is one of five school districts comprising the Lake County Education Service District. Adel School, grades 4–8, shares students with Plush School District 18, grades K–3. The two schools combined have about a dozen students. For grades 9–12, the students generally attend Lakeview High School or Paisley School.

The portion of the county the community is in is not in any community college district, but the county has a "contract-out-of-district" (COD) with Klamath Community College.

== See also ==
- Hart Mountain National Antelope Refuge
