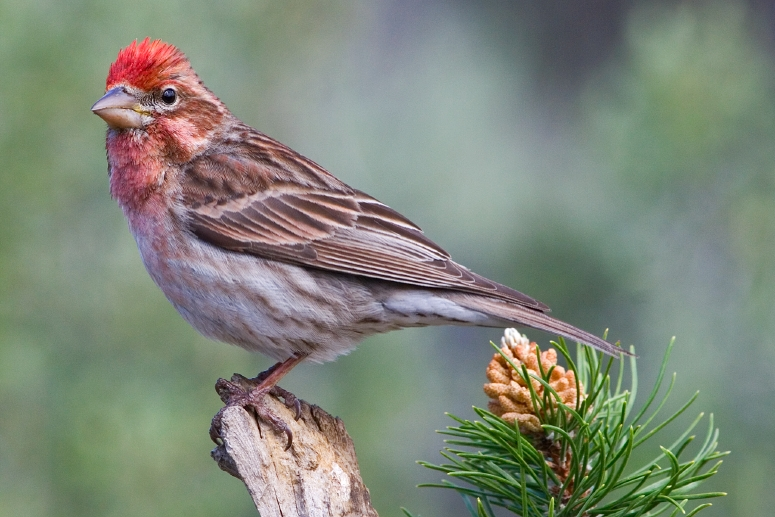
- Male
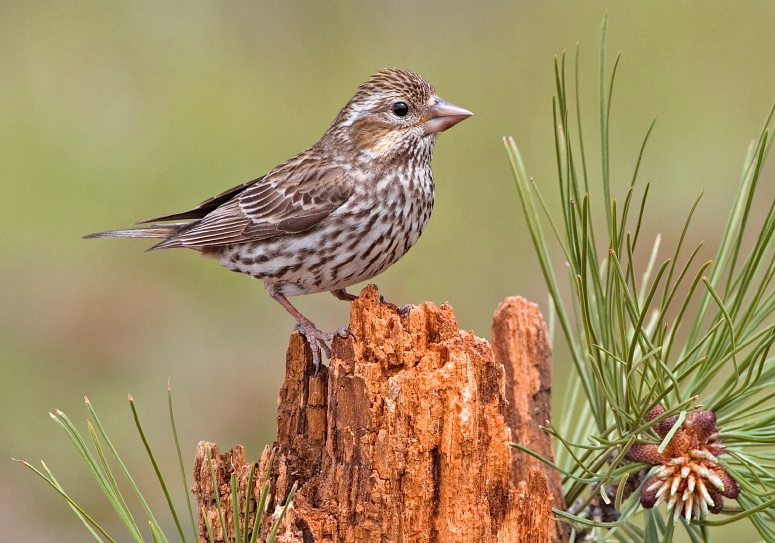
- Female

Conservation status
- Least Concern (IUCN 3.1)

Scientific classification
- Kingdom: Animalia
- Phylum: Chordata
- Class: Aves
- Order: Passeriformes
- Family: Fringillidae
- Subfamily: Carduelinae
- Genus: Haemorhous
- Species: H. cassinii

Binomial name
- Haemorhous cassinii (Baird, 1854)
- blue: breeding; green: year-round; yellow: wintering

Synonyms
- Burrica cassinii; Carpodacus cassinii

= Cassin's finch =

Species of bird

Cassin's finch (Haemorhous cassinii) is a bird in the finch family, Fringillidae. This species and the other "American rosefinches" are placed in the genus Haemorhous.

== Taxonomy ==
This bird was named after John Cassin, who was a curator at the Philadelphia Academy of Natural Sciences.

== Description ==
Measurements:

- Length: 6.3 in (16 cm)
- Weight: 0.8–1.2 oz (24–34 g)
- Wingspan: 9.8–10.6 in (25–27 cm)

Adults have a short forked brown tail and brown wings. They have a longer bill than the purple finch. Adult males are raspberry red on the head, breast, back and rump; their back and under-tail are streaked. Adult females have light brown upper-parts and light underparts with brown streaks throughout; their facial markings are less distinct than those of the female purple finch. They can have brown, red, and white eyes.

== Distribution and habitat ==
Their breeding habitat is coniferous forest in mountains of western North America as far south as northern New Mexico and Arizona; also Southern California near Baja California. They nest in large conifers. They move to lower elevations in winter.

Northernmost breeding birds migrate south, as do some birds throughout the range of the species; many birds are permanent residents, however. Some non-breeding birds winter as far south as central interior Mexico.

== Behaviour and ecology ==
=== Feeding ===
These birds forage in trees, sometimes in ground vegetation. They mainly eat seeds, buds, and berries, with some insects also being eaten mainly during the summer. When not nesting, they often feed in small flocks.

=== Reproduction ===
Nests are usually built in a large conifer tree, though deciduous trees can occasionally be used. Nesting can also occur in human-modified habitats like farmlands. Their nest is built in the shape of an open cup and can be made up of sticks, weeds, roots, bark, grass, plant fibres, animal hair, and lichens.

The female usually lives 4-5 eggs at a time, sometimes 3-6. Eggs are a bluish green with brown and black spots. Incubation is performed by the female over a period of about 12-14 days. Nestlings are fed by both parents, and leave the nest about 2 weeks after hatching.

== Conservation status ==
Cassin's finch is currently listed as Least Concern on the IUCN Red List, though the population trend is decreasing. The species was downlisted from Near Threatened in 2019 since the population declines seem to have slowed down.

Some present and future threats to this species include logging, fire and fire suppression, invasive species, disease, and droughts.
