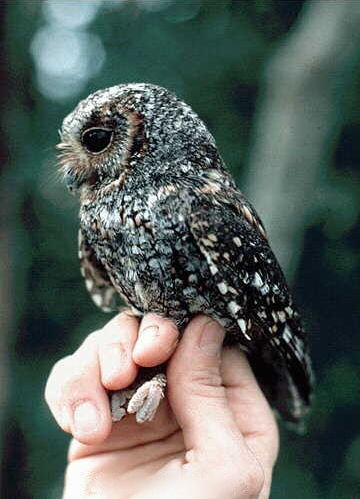

Conservation status
- Least Concern (IUCN 3.1)
- CITES Appendix II

Scientific classification
- Kingdom: Animalia
- Phylum: Chordata
- Class: Aves
- Order: Strigiformes
- Family: Strigidae
- Genus: Psiloscops; Coues, 1899
- Species: P. flammeolus

Binomial name
- Psiloscops flammeolus (Kaup, 1852)

Synonyms
- Otus flammeolus

= Flammulated owl =

Species of owl

The flammulated owl (Psiloscops flammeolus) is a small migratory North American owl in the family Strigidae. It is the only species placed in the genus Psiloscops.

== Taxonomy ==
The flammulated owl was formally described in 1852 by the German naturalist Johann Jakob Kaup under the binomial name Scops flammeola . He specified the type location as Mexico. This species was formerly placed with the scops owls in the genus Otus but is now placed in its own genus Psiloscops that was introduced in 1899 by Elliott Coues. The name Psiloscops combines the Ancient Greek psilos meaning "naked" or "smooth" with the genus name Scops, a synonym of Otus. The specific epithet flammeolus is Latin meaning "flame-coloured", "with flame-like markings" or "flammulated". The species is monotypic: no subspecies are recognised.

A molecular phylogenetic study of the owls published in 2019 found that the flammulated owl is a sister species to the Puerto Rican owl (Gymnasio nudipes).

== Description ==
The flammulated owl is a small, nocturnal owl approximately 15 cm (6 in) long with a 36 cm (14 in) wingspan. With such large wings for a small body, they can fly rapidly from tree to tree. Males and females can be distinguished by their weight. Females are larger, ranging from 62–65 g (2.2–2.3 oz) and males are smaller ranging from 50–52 g (1.8–1.8 oz). The owl gets the name flammulated from the flame-like markings on its face.

The flammulated owl is similar in appearance to the western screech owl, but is only about one-quarter the mass, lacks large ear tufts (but has small ear tufts that are barely visible), and has dark eyes and a different voice. The elf owl is smaller and the mountain pygmy owl is about the same size. The call is a series of relatively deep, single or double hoots.

== Distribution and habitat ==
It breeds from southern British Columbia and the western United States to central Mexico. It is a neotropical migrant and winters south of the United States, but also in South Texas, Arizona, and California. Unlike many owls, they are migratory, leaving Canada and the United States in the fall. In the winter, they are found in northern Central America, from southern Mexico to Guatemala and El Salvador. They leave their breeding grounds in August to head to their wintering areas, and then return to their breeding grounds in late April and early May.

== Behaviour and ecology ==
=== Breeding ===
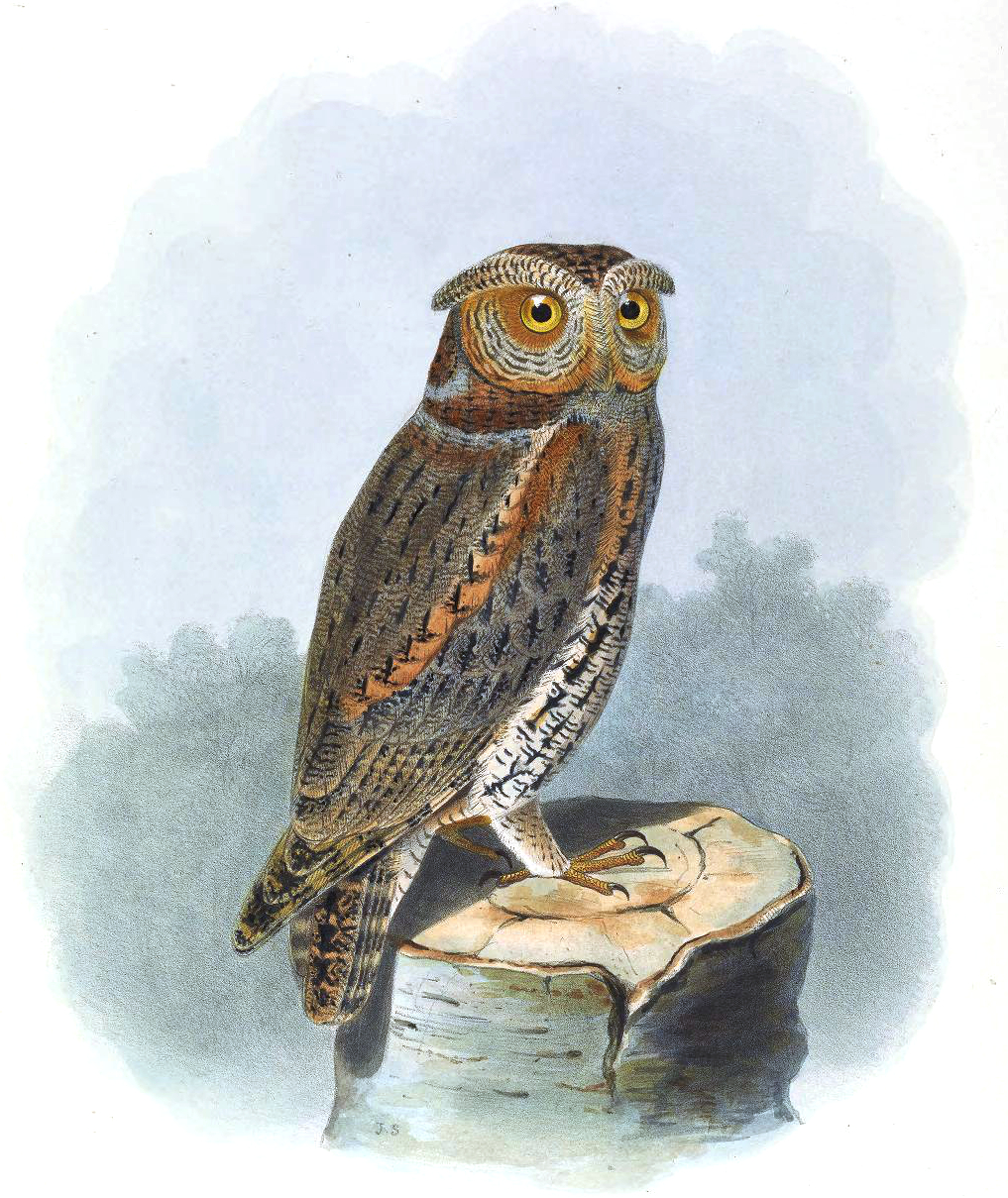

The flammulated owl nests in tree cavities and has two to four young at a time after a 26-day incubation period. The young are able to forage for their own prey after about 25–32 days. These owls are obligate cavity nesters, meaning they only create nests in tree cavities. Females usually select cavities that used to be woodpecker or northern flicker nests. Their nests are bare and have no nesting material. Flammulated owls tend to form breeding pairs with unoccupied habitat between breeding clusters. Unlike most owls, the Flammulated Owl often nests in loose colonies. According to EBird.org, One observation group once found 47 singing birds along a five mile stretch of road near Provo, UT. They tend to have one clutch of eggs annually. Like other raptors, they can live long and have high nesting success, and during the nesting period, the female owls rely on the males to forage for them. Nesting habitat in the western U.S. and Canada is usually mature, open ponderosa pine and Douglas fir forests. Flammulated owls can also be found breeding in deciduous forests with some conifers present. In deciduous habitat, they can still breed productively.

=== Food and feeding ===
They feed almost entirely on insects, but very occasionally eat small mammals such as shrews and small rodents. The insects they eat mostly consist of small Lepidoptera. They also eat crickets and beetles.

== Conservation status ==
Currently, the International Union for Conservation of Nature lists the flammulated owl as a species of least concern, but populations may be declining in some areas.

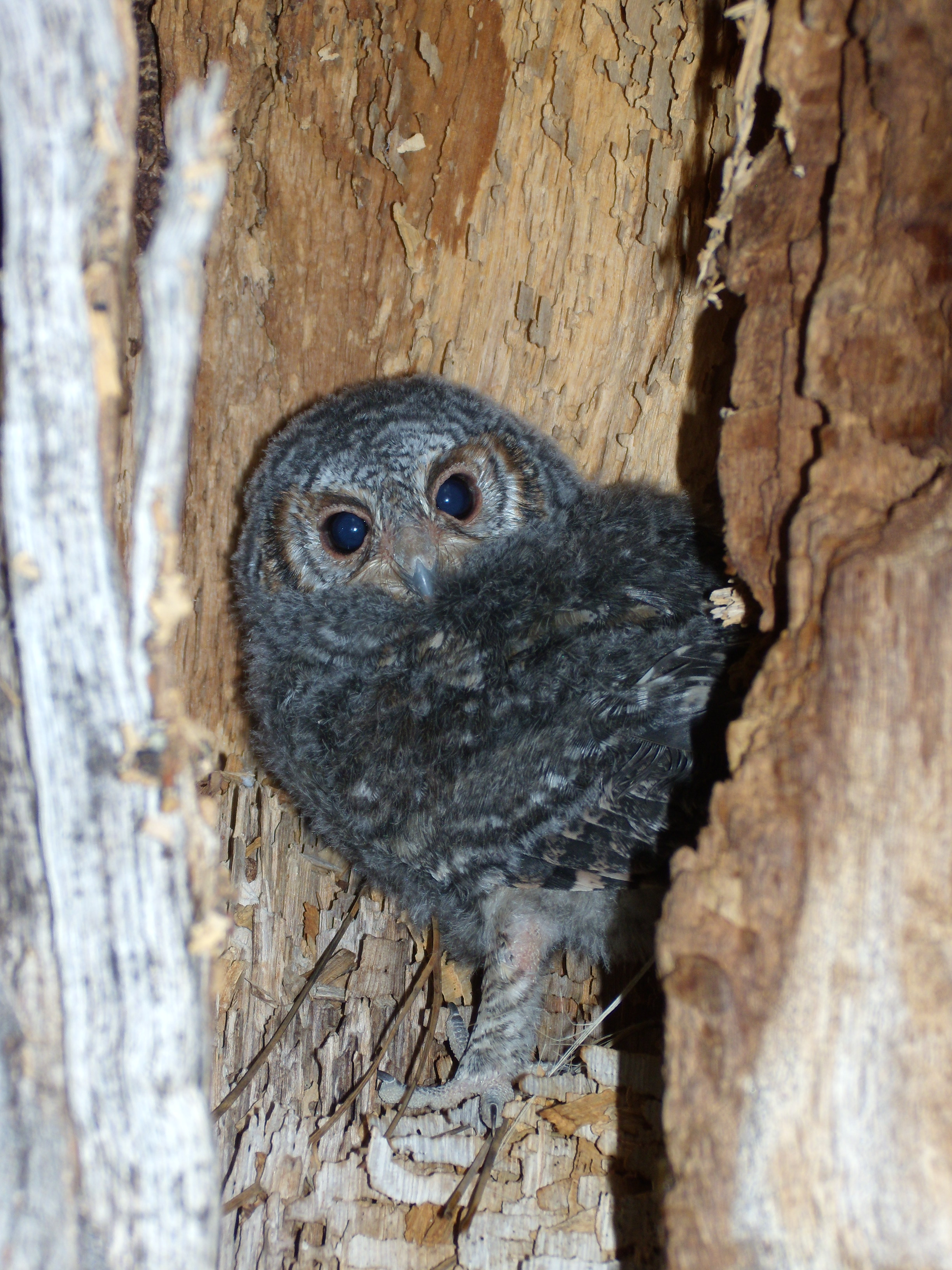
Juvenile flammulated owl, northern Arizona
