= Lake County, Oregon =

County in Oregon, United States

- County
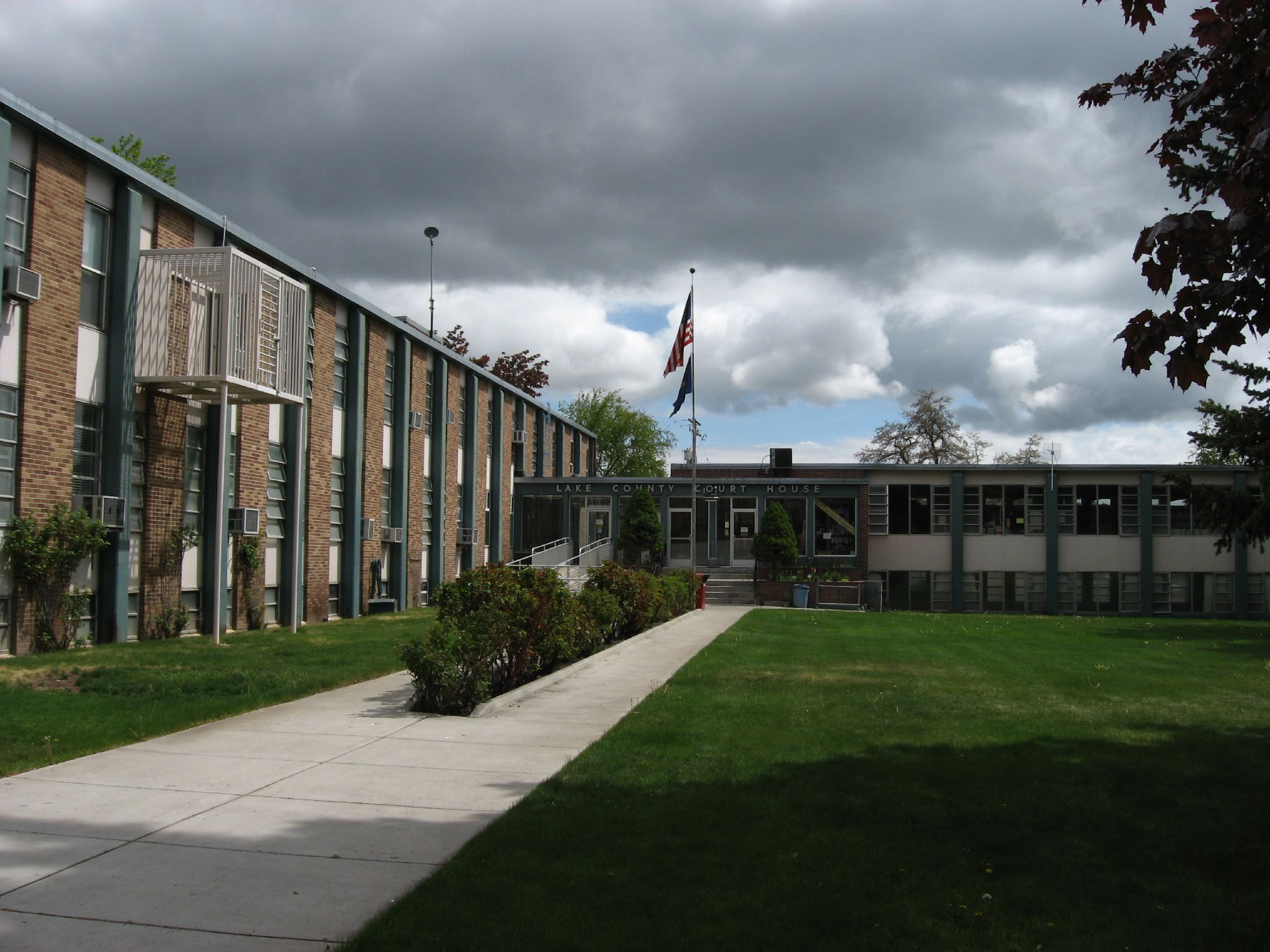
- Lake County Courthouse in Lakeview

- Location within the U.S. state of Oregon
- Coordinates: 42°47′N 120°23′W
- Country: United States
- State: Oregon
- Founded: October 24, 1874
- Named for: Multiple lakes
- Seat: Lakeview
- Largest city: Lakeview

Area
  - Total: 8,358 sq mi (21,650 km^{2})
  - Land: 8,139 sq mi (21,080 km^{2})
  - Water: 219 sq mi (570 km^{2}) 2.6%

Population (2020)
  - Total: 8,160
  - Estimate (2025): 8,187 ▲
  - Density: 1/sq mi (0.39/km^{2})
- Time zone: UTC−8 (Pacific)
  - Summer (DST): UTC−7 (PDT)
- Congressional district: 2nd
- Website: www.lakecountyor.org

Lake County is one of the 36 counties in the U.S. state of Oregon. As of the 2020 census, the population was 8,160. Its county seat is Lakeview. The county is named after the many lakes found within its boundaries, including Lake Abert, Summer Lake, Hart Lake, and Goose Lake.

Lake County is in the high desert region known as the Oregon Outback, on the northwestern edge of the Great Basin. The county is generally divided between the communities around Lakeview and Paisley to the south and the communities around Christmas Valley, Fort Rock, and Silver Lake to the north.

Its economy consists largely of agriculture and natural resource management and extraction. It is home to many large cattle ranches, hay farms, and timber holdings (both public and private), as well as several frontier towns and early 20th-century homesteads. Although lumber was once a primary economic driver in Lake County, today only one mill remains, at Lakeview.

== History ==
=== Pre-Columbian ===
Pre-Clovis era coprolites found in the Paisley Caves in northern Lake County in 2007 have been radiocarbon dated to 14,300 calendar years before present. DNA extracted from these human remains bears certain genetic markers found only in Native American populations. Luther Cressman found prehistoric artifacts in the Fort Rock Caves of northern Lake County in 1938, including basketry, stone tools, and a cache of woven sagebrush bark sandals which have been dated to more than 10,000 years ago.

=== Modern ===
European traders, explorers and military expeditions arrived in the region during the early part of the 19th century. Peter Skene Ogden led Hudson's Bay Company trappers to Goose Lake in 1827. In 1832, the Hudson Bay trappers under John Work were in the Goose Lake Valley and their journals mentioned Hunter's Hot Springs. Work's expedition visited Warner Lakes and Lake Abert and camped at Crooked Creek in the Chandler Park area. There they documented eating wild plums, which still grow in the area. They also reported being attacked by Indians. In 1838, Colonel J. J. Abert, a U.S. engineer, prepared a map that includes Warner Lakes and other natural features using information from the Hudson Bay trappers. In 1843, John C. Fremont led a party which named Christmas (Hart) Lake.

Lake County once hosted significant populations of Basque and Irish sheepherders. Disputes over grazing rights, exacerbated by the introduction of wheat farming, led to the eruption of range wars between cattle ranchers and sheep herders. At least one band of masked rifle-armed cattlemen killed sheep in the northern part of the county and in Deschutes County during the early 20th century and they came to be known as "sheepshooters". According to the Oregon History Project, 2,300 sheep were killed in a single night in April 1904 in Lake County.

Lake County grew with the arrival of homesteaders, but the dry climate made for challenging development.

Lake County was created from Jackson and Wasco Counties on October 24, 1874, by the State Legislature. It then included the present Klamath County and all of the present Lake County except Warner Valley. In 1882, land was assigned to create Klamath County, and in 1885 the Warner area from Grant County was added. Linkville, now Klamath Falls, was the first county seat.

M. Bullard gave 20 acres (81,000 m^{2}) as the Lakeview townsite. By the 1875 election, a town had been started and an election moved the county seat to Lakeview. Because of poor transportation connections with the rest of Oregon, the early economic orientation of Lake County was toward California: both the San Francisco Chronicle and the San Francisco Examiner arrived in Lakeview daily, often before The Oregonian. During the 1840s and 1850s the county was part of the military courier route between The Dalles on the Columbia River and the Presidio in San Francisco.

The county acquired a railroad connection in the 1890s. That railroad spur, the Nevada–California–Oregon Railway line running from Lakeview to Reno, Nevada, emphasized the isolation of the county from the rest of Oregon. A devastating fire in 1900 destroyed much of Lakeview, including 75 businesses.

During the summer of 2012, two wildfires burned large areas of Lake County. Both fires were the result of lightning strikes. The Lava Fire burned over 21,500 acres (87 km^{2}) of public rangeland and scrub forest in and around lava beds north of Fort Rock. The Barry Point Fire burned 92,977 acres (376.26 km^{2}) of public and private forest land along the California border.

== Geography ==
Map of Lake County

According to the United States Census Bureau, the county has a total area of 8,358 square miles (21,650 km^{2}), of which 8,139 square miles (21,080 km^{2}) is land and 219 square miles (570 km^{2}) (2.6%) is water. It is the third-largest county in Oregon.

Lake County ranges in elevation from 4,130 to 8,446 feet (1,259 to 2,574 m). The highest point in Lake County is Crane Mountain. The mountain is located 6 miles (9.7 km) north of the California border. Lake County has six other peaks with elevations above 8,000 feet (2,400 m), all located in the southern half of the county. Hager Mountain is the highest peak in the northern part of the county.

The area includes alkali lakes, high desert scrub, and forests of Western Juniper, Ponderosa Pine, and Lodgepole Pine in the hills and mountains. There are also several unusual geologic features and good areas for rockhounding and geological touring.

Lost Forest Research Natural Area is a protected relic forest closely associated with the Christmas Valley Sand Dunes in northeastern Lake County. Fossil Lake is an area nearby where many fossils of prehistoric animals have been identified. Glass Buttes is an obsidian complex in the extreme northeast corner of the county. Crack in the Ground, northeast of Christmas Valley is a long fissure with ice in its floor year round. Big Hole, Hole-in-the-Ground, and Fort Rock are ancient maar craters in the northwestern part of the county.

The southern portion of the county was designated as a dark-sky preserve by DarkSky International in 2024.

=== Watersheds ===
These twelve watersheds occur in whole or in part within Lake County:

- Beaver-South Fork watershed
- Goose Lake watershed
- Guano watershed
- Lake Abert watershed
- Little Deschutes
- Lost River watershed
- Crooked River, South Fork
- Silver watershed
- Sprague
- Summer Lake watershed
- Warner Lakes watershed
- Williamson

=== Lakes ===
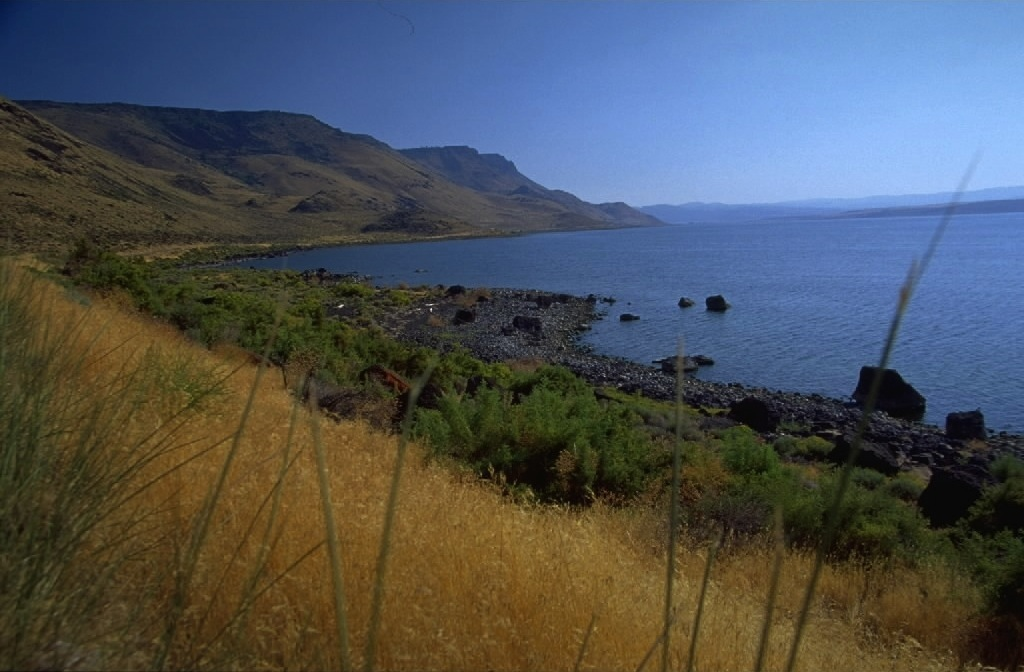
The East shore of Lake Abert.

Named lakes wholly or partly in Lake County include:

- Abert Lake
- Alkali Lake
- Duncan Reservoir
- Thompson Reservoir
- Ana Reservoir
- Campbell Lake
- Crump Lake
- Deadhorse Lake
- Dog Lake
- Drews Reservoir
- Goose Lake
- Hart Lake
- Heart Lake
- Silver Lake
- Summer Lake
- Warner Lakes (Pelican, Crump, Hart, Anderson, Swamp, Mugwump, Flagstaff, Upper Campbell, Lower Campbell, Stone Corral, Turpin, and Bluejoint).

=== Adjacent counties ===
- Deschutes County (north)
- Harney County (east)
- Washoe County, Nevada (south)
- Modoc County, California (south)
- Klamath County (west)

=== National protected areas ===
- Deschutes National Forest (part)
- Fremont National Forest (part)
- Hart Mountain National Antelope Refuge
- Sheldon National Wildlife Refuge (part)

== Demographics ==
Historical population
Census	Pop.	Note	%±
1880	2,804		—
1890	2,604		−7.1%
1900	2,847		9.3%
1910	4,658		63.6%
1920	3,991		−14.3%
1930	4,833		21.1%
1940	6,293		30.2%
1950	6,649		5.7%
1960	7,158		7.7%
1970	6,343		−11.4%
1980	7,532		18.7%
1990	7,186		−4.6%
2000	7,422		3.3%
2010	7,895		6.4%
2020	8,160		3.4%
2025 (est.)	8,187	▲	0.3%
U.S. Decennial Census; 1790–1960 1900–1990; 1990–2000 2010–2020

=== 2020 census ===
Lake County, Oregon – Racial and ethnic composition Note: the US Census treats Hispanic/Latino as an ethnic category. This table excludes Latinos from the racial categories and assigns them to a separate category. Hispanics/Latinos may be of any race.
Race / Ethnicity (NH = Non-Hispanic)	Pop 1980	Pop 1990	Pop 2000	Pop 2010	Pop 2020	% 1980	% 1990	% 2000	% 2010	% 2020
White alone (NH)	7,242	6,689	6,617	6,875	6,508	96.15%	93.08%	89.15%	87.08%	79.75%
Black or African American alone (NH)	3	5	8	37	49	0.04%	0.07%	0.11%	0.47%	0.60%
Native American or Alaska Native alone (NH)	83	178	166	149	114	1.10%	2.48%	2.24%	1.89%	1.40%
Asian alone (NH)	52	41	53	44	52	0.69%	0.57%	0.71%	0.56%	0.64%
Native Hawaiian or Pacific Islander alone (NH)	x	x	10	5	10	x	x	0.13%	0.06%	0.12%
Other race alone (NH)	0	3	6	7	42	0.00%	0.04%	0.08%	0.09%	0.51%
Mixed race or Multiracial (NH)	x	x	158	233	583	x	x	2.13%	2.95%	7.14%
Hispanic or Latino (any race)	152	270	404	545	802	2.02%	3.76%	5.44%	6.90%	9.83%
Total	7,532	7,186	7,422	7,895	8,160	100.00%	100.00%	100.00%	100.00%	100.00%

=== American Community Survey 2025 data ===
The United States Census Bureau estimated that in 2025, Lake County’s population was 8.225. It was also estimated that the county's population was 81,00% Non-Hispanic White, 10,00% Hispanic or Latino, 1,20% Non-Hispanic Black, 0,80% Asian, 2,50% Native American, 0,30% Pacific Islander, and 4,20% Multiracial.

Total	Population	Percentage
Non-Hispanic White	6.662	81,00%
Hispanic or Latino	823	10,00%
Non-Hispanic Black	99	1,20%
Asian	66	0,80%
Native American	206	2,50%
Pacific Islander	25	0,30%
Non-Hispanic Multiracial	345	4,20%

As of the 2020 census, the county had a population of 8,160. Of the residents, 19.1% were under the age of 18 and 24.7% were 65 years of age or older; the median age was 47.3 years. For every 100 females there were 116.3 males, and for every 100 females age 18 and over there were 120.8 males. 0.0% of residents lived in urban areas and 100.0% lived in rural areas.

The racial makeup of the county was 82.0% White, 0.6% Black or African American, 1.6% American Indian and Alaska Native, 0.7% Asian, 0.1% Native Hawaiian and Pacific Islander, 3.9% from some other race, and 11.1% from two or more races. Hispanic or Latino residents of any race comprised 9.8% of the population.

There were 3,387 households in the county, of which 24.1% had children under the age of 18 living with them and 22.9% had a female householder with no spouse or partner present. About 33.3% of all households were made up of individuals and 16.1% had someone living alone who was 65 years of age or older.

There were 4,195 housing units, of which 19.3% were vacant. Among occupied housing units, 69.5% were owner-occupied and 30.5% were renter-occupied. The homeowner vacancy rate was 2.3% and the rental vacancy rate was 8.4%.

=== 2010 census ===
As of the 2010 census, there were 7,895 people, 3,378 households, and 2,148 families residing in the county. The population density was 1.0 inhabitant per square mile (0.39/km^{2}). There were 4,439 housing units at an average density of 0.5 per square mile (0.19/km^{2}). The racial makeup of the county was 90.3% white, 2.1% American Indian, 0.7% Asian, 0.5% black or African American, 0.1% Pacific islander, 3.1% from other races, and 3.3% from two or more races. Those of Hispanic or Latino origin made up 6.9% of the population. In terms of ancestry, 27.9% were German, 19.3% were Irish, 19.2% were English, and 5.1% were American.

Of the 3,378 households, 24.5% had children under the age of 18 living with them, 52.1% were married couples living together, 7.4% had a female householder with no husband present, 36.4% were non-families, and 31.3% of all households were made up of individuals. The average household size was 2.20 and the average family size was 2.73. The median age was 47.4 years.

The median income for a household in the county was $41,105 and the median income for a family was $47,188. Males had a median income of $39,435 versus $26,000 for females. The per capita income for the county was $22,586. About 13.1% of families and 17.5% of the population were below the poverty line, including 27.4% of those under age 18 and 5.8% of those age 65 or over.

=== 2000 census ===
As of the 2000 census, there were 7,422 people, 3,084 households, and 2,152 families residing in the county. The population density was 1 person per square mile (0.39 person/km^{2}). There were 3,999 housing units at an average density of 0 units per square mile (0/km^{2}). The racial makeup of the county was 90.97% White, 0.13% Black or African American, 2.37% Native American, 0.71% Asian, 0.13% Pacific Islander, 3.19% from other races, and 2.48% from two or more races. 5.44% of the population were Hispanic or Latino of any race. 14.1% were of Irish, 14.0% United States or American, 13.8% German and 11.8% English ancestry. 95.9% spoke English and 3.6% Spanish as their first language.

There were 3,084 households, out of which 29.00% had children under the age of 18 living with them, 58.60% were married couples living together, 7.50% had a female householder with no husband present, and 30.20% were non-families. 26.20% of all households were made up of individuals, and 11.10% had someone living alone who was 65 years of age or older. The average household size was 2.39 and the average family size was 2.84.

In the county, the population was spread out, with 24.90% under the age of 18, 5.10% from 18 to 24, 24.30% from 25 to 44, 28.10% from 45 to 64, and 17.70% who were 65 years of age or older. The median age was 43 years. For every 100 females there were 100.50 males. For every 100 females age 18 and over, there were 98.30 males.

The median income for a household in the county was $29,506, and the median income for a family was $36,182. Males had a median income of $29,454 versus $23,475 for females. The per capita income for the county was $16,136. About 13.40% of families and 16.10% of the population were below the poverty line, including 20.40% of those under age 18 and 9.50% of those age 65 or over.

== Communities ==
=== Cities ===
- Paisley
- Lakeview (county seat)

=== Census-designated places ===
- New Pine Creek
- Plush
- Silver Lake

=== Unincorporated communities ===
- Adel
- Christmas Valley
- Fort Rock
- Quartz Mountain
- Summer Lake
- Valley Falls
- West Side

=== Former communities ===
- Fleetwood
- Fremont
- Stauffer

== Politics ==
Though Lake County is located in central Oregon, politically it falls in line with the eastern side of the state. The majority of registered voters who are part of a political party in Lake County, as well as most counties in eastern Oregon, are members of the Republican Party. Since 2000, Republican nominees for president have always won over 70 percent of Lake County's votes. In the 2008 presidential election, 71.53% of Lake County voters voted for Republican John McCain, while 25.95% voted for Democrat Barack Obama and 1.53% of voters either voted for a Third Party candidate or wrote in a candidate. These numbers show a small shift towards the Democratic candidate when compared to the 2004 presidential election, in which 77.8% of Lake County voters voted for George W. Bush, while 20.5% voted for John Kerry, and 1.7% of voters either voted for a Third Party candidate or wrote in a candidate.

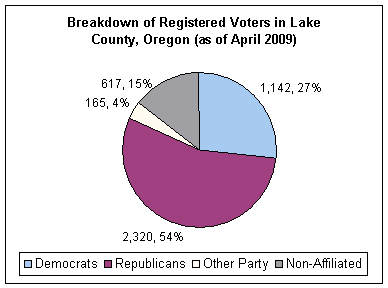

United States presidential election results for Lake County, Oregon
Year	Republican		Democratic		Third party(ies)	
Year	No.	%	No.	%	No.	%
1904	394	74.20%	115	21.66%	22	4.14%
1908	465	60.78%	239	31.24%	61	7.97%
1912	297	27.99%	357	33.65%	407	38.36%
1916	793	41.94%	971	51.35%	127	6.72%
1920	1,136	72.08%	358	22.72%	82	5.20%
1924	917	60.33%	304	20.00%	299	19.67%
1928	1,014	63.61%	549	34.44%	31	1.94%
1932	839	40.26%	1,199	57.53%	46	2.21%
1936	725	32.18%	1,274	56.55%	254	11.27%
1940	1,121	44.06%	1,414	55.58%	9	0.35%
1944	1,008	46.47%	1,147	52.88%	14	0.65%
1948	1,083	48.05%	1,104	48.98%	67	2.97%
1952	1,727	58.68%	1,205	40.94%	11	0.37%
1956	1,623	55.73%	1,289	44.27%	0	0.00%
1960	1,555	51.90%	1,441	48.10%	0	0.00%
1964	1,304	47.89%	1,419	52.11%	0	0.00%
1968	1,538	61.40%	730	29.14%	237	9.46%
1972	1,619	61.03%	777	29.29%	257	9.69%
1976	1,575	51.00%	1,381	44.72%	132	4.27%
1980	2,234	60.56%	1,147	31.09%	308	8.35%
1984	2,466	67.51%	1,184	32.41%	3	0.08%
1988	2,161	62.40%	1,237	35.72%	65	1.88%
1992	1,791	47.11%	1,019	26.80%	992	26.09%
1996	2,239	61.31%	962	26.34%	451	12.35%
2000	2,830	75.89%	707	18.96%	192	5.15%
2004	3,039	77.82%	802	20.54%	64	1.64%
2008	2,638	71.53%	957	25.95%	93	2.52%
2012	2,808	75.69%	770	20.75%	132	3.56%
2016	3,022	76.90%	639	16.26%	269	6.84%
2020	3,470	79.53%	792	18.15%	101	2.31%
2024	3,421	81.20%	681	16.16%	111	2.63%

== Economy ==
The economy in Lake County is reliant on lumber, agriculture, natural resource extraction, health care, a prison and government. The area is also trying to promote itself for the many outdoor recreational and sightseeing opportunities offered.

Lake County includes numerous cattle ranches. Irrigation has also permitted some agriculture based upon the raising of livestock and the growing of hay and grain despite the low rainfall and a short growing season.

Lumber and wood products are taken from the Fremont National Forest, Bureau of Land Management properties and private landholdings. The Collins Companies operates the last remaining mill in the area, the Lakeview sawmill, and is also a large landowner in the region. Over 78% of the land in Lake County is owned and managed by the federal and state government.

The Lakeview area of Lake County also includes a perlite mine and once included uranium mining, with processing to yellowcake being completed at the Lakeview Mining Company plant; the mines and mill required remediation. Several exploratory wells were dug for oil, but without success.

A railroad line ships timber products and perlite to Burlington Northern's rail hub in Alturas, California. At one time the railway was the only County owned and operated rail line in the country.

Government employment for the national forest and the regional Bureau of Land Management headquarters provides many of the higher salary jobs in an economy that otherwise would have to rely on seasonal agricultural, tourism and lumber jobs. The Bureau of Land Management is landowner of 49% of the lands within the county.

Tourism is a growing industry because of the county's many attractions which include Hart Mountain National Antelope Refuge, Hunter's Hot Springs, Goose Lake, Warner Canyon, hanggliding and areas for rock hunting.

Lake County is home to the Lakeview Hospital, and other regional health care facilities. It's also the location for The Warner Creek Correctional Facility opened in 2005 and is a 400-bed minimum security state prison. The prison employs an average of 110 correctional professionals and is located on a site comprising 91 acres (370,000 m^{2}). The facility itself occupies less than 15 acres (61,000 m^{2}) and utilizes approximately 117,000 sq ft (10,900 m^{2}). of building space which includes areas for inmate housing, work and education programs, health services, food services, religious services, physical plant, warehouse and storage, vehicle maintenance, a laundry facility, recreational activities, administration and various other functions. A unique feature of the prison is its use of natural geothermal sources deep inside the Earth. The geothermally heated water is pumped up through a well and piped into a heat exchange unit where the heat is then transferred to the prison's water-loop system. Once the heat has been transferred and the water has cooled, the water is re-injected back into the ground. Two prisoners briefly escaped in 2008.

== Arts and culture ==
=== Museums and other points of interest ===
North Lake County includes many geological sites including the Fort Rock, a crater marked by wave activity in what was once an ice age lake bed, and the Fort Rock Homestead Village Museum. It's also a site where camel bones and Native American artifacts have been uncovered. The "world's oldest shoes" were found here in 1938, changing the dates range scientists believed that humans inhabited the far west from 4,000 years ago.

Several subsequent discoveries of even older sandals in the northern Great Basin confirmed the importance of archaeologist Luther Cressman's work. For this find, and for other research that broke down standing theories about the nature of the prehistoric Northwest, Cressman became known as the father of Oregon archaeology. Other sights in North Lake include the Lost Forest, Crack-in-the-ground, and Hole-in-the-ground

Oregon sunstones are found north of Plush. The Oregon sunstone is Oregon's state gemstone. Glass Buttes are high desert mountains in northeastern Lake County named for the large deposits of obsidian found on their slopes. This is a favorite collecting area for rockhounds.

Other areas of interest include, Abert Lake and Abert Rim, Goose Lake, Hunter's Hot Springs and its Old Perpetual Geyser, Lake County Museum, Schminck Memorial Museum, Lake County Round-Up Museum, Schmink Museum, Warner Canyon ski area, Gearhart Mountain Wilderness, Sheldon National Wildlife Refuge, Summer Lake Hot Springs, sunstones (Oregon's state gemstone) near Plush, Warner Wetlands, Summer Lake Wildlife Area and sections of the Fremont National Forest of the Fremont–Winema National Forests.

The Hart Mountain National Antelope Refuge includes big-horn sheep, pronghorn, sage grouse, predatory birds and migratory birds. The Lake County Examiner is located in Lakeview and has been published continuously since the late 19th century.

== Media ==
=== Newspapers ===
- Desert Whispers
- Lake County Examiner
- The Community Breeze

== Infrastructure ==
=== Major highways ===
- Oregon Route 31
- Oregon Route 140
- U.S. Route 395

=== Passenger and freight railways ===
- Lake County Railroad

== Education ==
School districts include:

- Adel School District 21
- Lakeview School District 7
- North Lake School District 14
- Paisley School District 11
- Plush School District 18

The Adel and Plush districts share students, with Plush taking the sum's Kindergarten through grade 3 students and Adel taking the sum's grades 4-8 students. For high school the districts send their students to Paisley and to Lakeview High School of the Lakeview district.

The northern portion of the county is in the Central Oregon Community College district. The remainder is not in any community college district, but the county has a "contract-out-of-district" (COD) with Klamath Community College.

== See also ==
- National Register of Historic Places listings in Lake County, Oregon
