= National Register of Historic Places listings in Lake County, Oregon =

Location of Lake County in Oregon

This list presents the full set of buildings, structures, objects, sites, or districts designated on the National Register of Historic Places in Lake County, Oregon, United States, and offers brief descriptive information about each of them. The National Register recognizes places of national, state, or local historic significance across the United States. Out of over 90,000 National Register sites nationwide, Oregon is home to over 2,000, and 20 of those are found in Lake County.

This National Park Service list is complete through NPS recent listings posted May 1, 2026.

== Current listings ==
	Name on the Register	Image	Date listed	Location	City or town	Description
1	Abert Lake Petroglyphs	Abert Lake Petroglyphs	November 20, 1974 (#74002292)	Address restricted	Lakeview vicinity	Peoples of the Great Basin cultural tradition pecked these petroglyphs onto two basaltic boulders near major game migration routes, in connection with rituals related to hunting activities. They were made within the last 10,000 years, but cannot be dated more precisely.
2	Alger Theatre	Alger Theatre	March 28, 2024 (#100010118)	24 South F Street; 42°11′20″N 120°20′46″W	Lakeview	
3	Bailey and Massingill General Store	Bailey and Massingill General Store	October 25, 1984 (#84000133)	4 N. E St. 42°11′23″N 120°20′41″W	Lakeview	Lakeview's first commercial establishment opened on this site in 1876, and was destroyed by fire in 1900. The owners immediately rebuilt their business, incorporating a unique set of fire preventive features into the new building, including metal-sheathed walls and a fire awning.
4	Cabin Lake Guard Station	Cabin Lake Guard Station	April 11, 1986 (#86000827)	Deschutes National Forest; 43°29′27″N 121°03′22″W	Fort Rock vicinity	
5	East Lake Abert Archeological District	East Lake Abert Archeological District	November 29, 1978 (#78002295)	Address restricted	Valley Falls vicinity	
6	Ed Eskelin Ranch Complex	Ed Eskelin Ranch Complex	February 25, 1991 (#91000062)	County Road 5-10; 43°15′02″N 120°54′42″W	Silver Lake vicinity	Built in the 1930s with both new construction and salvaged materials and buildings, this ranch compound reflects the perseverance of small-scale stock farmers through two phases of settlement in the Fort Rock basin: failed attempts at dryland farming around 1910, then more successful irrigated ventures in the 1930s.
7	Fort Rock Cave	Fort Rock Cave	October 15, 1966 (#66000641)	Address restricted	Fort Rock vicinity	This cave yielded to archeologists the "Fort Rock sandals", the oldest manufactured articles found in the Americas, which demonstrated the early development of weaving among Native Americans. Occupation of the site has been dated to 11,000 BCE.
8	Greaser Petroglyph Site	Greaser Petroglyph Site	November 20, 1974 (#74002293)	Address restricted	Adel vicinity	
9	Heryford Brothers Building	Heryford Brothers Building	April 30, 1980 (#80003330)	524 Center St. 42°11′23″N 120°20′44″W	Lakeview	
10	William P. Heryford House	William P. Heryford House	May 22, 1980 (#80003331)	108 S. F St. 42°11′18″N 120°20′47″W	Lakeview	
11	Lake County Round Sale Barn	Lake County Round Sale Barn	November 21, 2003 (#03001180)	3531 N. 6th St. 42°11′43″N 120°21′40″W	Lakeview	
12	Mitchell Recreation Area	Mitchell Recreation Area	February 20, 2003 (#03000050)	Forest Service Rd. 34, Fremont National Forest; 42°25′52″N 120°51′27″W	Bly vicinity	It is the only location in the continental U.S. where Americans were killed during World War II as a direct result of enemy action.
13	Nevada–California–Oregon Railway Passenger Station	Nevada–California–Oregon Railway Passenger Station	August 22, 1983 (#83002157)	1400 Center St. 42°11′22″N 120°21′21″W	Lakeview	
14	Paisley Five Mile Point Caves	Paisley Five Mile Point Caves	September 24, 2014 (#14000708)	Address restricted	Paisley vicinity	
15	Picture Rock Pass Petroglyphs Site	Picture Rock Pass Petroglyphs Site	August 28, 1975 (#75001585)	Address restricted	Silver Lake vicinity	
16	Post and King Saloon	Post and King Saloon	March 17, 1977 (#77001104)	N. 2nd and E Sts. 42°11′27″N 120°20′43″W	Lakeview	
17	David L. Shirk Ranch	David L. Shirk Ranch	November 4, 2009 (#09000891)	Guano Valley; 42°14′19″N 119°31′12″W	Adel vicinity	
18	Governor Earl W. Snell Aircraft Crash Site	Governor Earl W. Snell Aircraft Crash Site	October 18, 2018 (#100003032)	T40S R16E sec25, Fremont–Winema National Forest; 42°04′15″N 120°46′44″W	Lakeview vicinity	
19	Stone Bridge and the Oregon Central Military Wagon Road	Stone Bridge and the Oregon Central Military Wagon Road	November 8, 1974 (#74001689)	The Narrows S of Plush; 42°21′05″N 119°50′26″W	Plush vicinity	
20	John N. and Cornelia Watson House	John N. and Cornelia Watson House	February 21, 1989 (#89000051)	5 N. H St. 42°11′23″N 120°20′55″W	Lakeview	

== See also ==
- National Register of Historic Places listings in Oregon
- Listings in neighboring counties: Deschutes, Harney, Klamath, Modoc, Washoe
- List of National Historic Landmarks in Oregon
- Historic preservation
- History of Oregon
- Lists of Oregon-related topics
