= Lake County Airport =

Lake County Airport may refer to:

- Lake County Airport (Colorado) in Leadville, Colorado, United States (FAA: LXV)
- Lake County Airport (Oregon) in Lakeview, Oregon, United States (FAA: LKV)
