= KLKV =

KLKV may refer to:

- Lake County Airport (Oregon) (ICAO code KLKV)
- KLKV (FM), a radio station (99.9 FM) licensed to serve Hunt, Texas, United States
