= LKV =

LKV may refer to:

- LKV, the IATA and FAA LID code for Lake County Airport (Oregon), Lake County, Oregon
- Landsforbundet for Kvinders Valgret, a defunct Danish association for women's suffrage
