= William A. Massingill =

American businessman and state legislator (1863–1927)

Member of the Oregon House of Representatives from the 22nd district
- In office 1898–1899
- Preceded by: Virgil Conn
- Succeeded by: Robert A. Emmitt

Personal details
- Born: November 28, 1863 Napa County, California, U.S.
- Died: March 19, 1927 (aged 63) Lakeview, Oregon, U.S.
- Party: Republican
- Spouse: Minnie Ellen Bernard
- Profession: Businessman

William Alvin Massingill (November 28, 1863 – March 19, 1927), also known as Billy Massingill or W. A. Massingill, was an American businessman and politician who served as state legislator for the state of Oregon. He served one two-year term in the Oregon House of Representatives as a Republican legislator, representing a large rural district in south-central Oregon. He also ran a general store, sawmill, and a wool shipping warehouse in Lakeview, Oregon, and was that town's postmaster for several years.

== Early life ==
Massingill was born in Napa County, California, on November 28, 1863, the son of Al Massingill. His father was a native of Louisiana who moved to California as a young man. His mother's maiden name was Hoover. She was born in Illinois, but her family subsequently moved west and put down roots in California's Napa Valley.

Massingill was raised in Calistoga, California, a community at the north end of the Napa Valley. As a young man, he worked as a clerk in a drug store in Calistoga. He left the Napa Valley in the 1880s.

== Community leader ==
Massingill arrived in Lakeview in 1887, where he engaged in the mercantile business. In 1891, he became a founding partner in the Dry Creek Irrigation and Water Company along with George C. Turner and B. J. Neilson. The company was incorporated in Lake County with $5,000 in startup capital. The business lasted until 1906, when Governor George Chamberlain dissolved the corporation for failing to report the status of the corporation to the Oregon Secretary of State for two consecutive years.

Massingill was also active in the local community. He was a member of several fraternal organizations, including both the Elks and the local Masonic lodge. In addition, he was active in local politics and government affairs, as a supporter of the Republican Party. In 1891, he was elected to the Lakeview city council. That same year, Massingill married Minnie Ellen Bernard on November 18 at her parents' home in Jacksonville, Oregon. Together they had one daughter.

In 1894, the local Republican Party nominated him to run for Lake County clerk. He was elected to that position as part of a Republican landslide in that year's county election. In the general election, Massingill received 388 votes while his Democratic opponent, Uriah F. Abshier received 219 and the People's Party candidate, J. S. McLaughlin, got only 136 votes. He was nominated again for county clerk in 1896 and subsequently re-elected to a second term. In the 1896 election, Massingill got 546 votes with F. W. Foster, the People's Party candidate, receiving 148 while the Democratic candidate, R. W. Vernon, received only 106 votes.

In 1897, Massingill formed a partnership with Harry Bailey to operate a general store in downtown Lakeview. To get started, the two partners purchased an existing mercantile business that was already well established in the community, having been founded in 1876. They re-named the store Bailey and Massingill. They successfully operated the business until 1900, when a fire destroyed the company's store. Massingill and Bailey incurred an $18,000 loss (equivalent to $696,600 in 2025) as a result of the fire. However, they quickly rebuilt and reopened their store within a few months of the fire. Their new store was a 4,200-square-foot (390 m^{2}) structure built with bricks and other fire-resistant materials. That proved to be a good decision, when, two years later, a fire in an adjacent building was stopped by the store's fire-resistant structure.

== State legislator ==
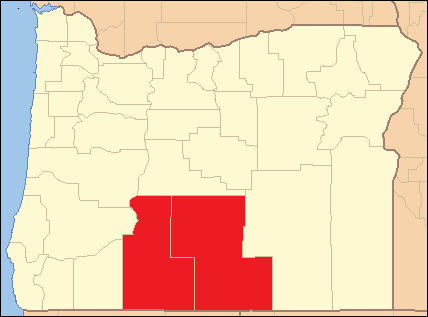
Oregon House District 22, 1898–1899

Massingill actively supported the Republican Party and its candidates all his life. In 1898, Massingill decided to run for a seat in the Oregon House of Representatives, representing District 22, which included Lake and Klamath counties in rural south-central Oregon. He was selected as the Republican nominee and then won the seat in the general election by just 11 votes. The general election vote count was 408 votes for Massingill against 397 for the Union Party candidate, J. R. Griffith. The Union Party was a temporary political party made up of Oregon Democrats, People's Party supporters, and Silver Republicans aligned against traditional Republicans like Massingill.

In mid-1898, Oregon's governor, William Paine Lord, called a special session of the legislature to conduct the business left undone by the 1897 regular session which failed to organize itself or transact any business. The special session began on September 26. As the 1898 special session began, Massingill was appointed to the credentials committee. When the session was organized, he was appointed chairman of cities committee. At the end of the session, he was appointed to the special compensation committee, responsible for determining appropriate salary and reimbursement payments for legislators and personnel working in the House during the special legislative session. The 1898 special session successfully conducted the work deferred by the 1897 regular session and was adjourned on October 15, 1898.

After a few months' break, the regular 1899 legislative session got underway. Massingill took his seat in the Oregon House on January 9, 1899, representing District 22. He served through the legislature's regular session which ended on February 18. During the session, the speaker appointed Massingill to a special settlement committee, chaired by the Oregon State Treasurer. The committee was charged with auditing the State Treasurer's account books. Massingill did not run for re-election in 1900.

== Later life ==
After leaving the state legislature, Massingill returned to his mercantile business in Lakeview. However, he remained active in public affairs. For example, Governor Theodore Geer appointed Massingill to the board of regents for the Ashland State Normal School (now Southern Oregon University). Two years later, Governor Geer extended his appointment to a full four-year term on the Ashland Normal School's board of regents.

In 1902, Massingill represented Lake County at the state's Republican convention which nominated the party's candidate for Oregon's seat in the United States Congress. Two years later, Massingill once again represented Lake County at the state Republican convention. During that convention, delegates considered him for the District 9 state senate seat representing Crook, Grant, Klamath, and Lake counties. However, Crook and Klamath counties had their own home-county favorites for that seat. Eventually, the convention settled on J. A. Laycock from Grant County as the party's candidate for the District 9 senate seat.

In 1906, Massingill and three partners formed the Lakeview Land and Lumber Company. The business was incorporated with $10,000 in capital. The company built its sawmill along Camp Creek, north of Lakeview.

During the early years of 1900, Massingill began taking extended vacations in San Diego, where his daughter lived. Sometime around 1908, he made San Diego his primary residence, but still returned to Lakeview regularly to oversee his business interests there.

Massingill sold his interest in the Bailey and Massingill store in 1909. This allowed him to increase his involvement with the Lakeview Land and Lumber Company sawmill operation. By 1912, the mill was producing 1.3 million board feet of lumber per year.

As a leader in the local business community, Massingill helped bring the Nevada–California–Oregon Railway to Lakeview. After the railroad arrived in 1912, Massingill and his long-time business partner Harry Bailey began operating a wool warehouse next to the tracks. Once their warehouse was in place, all the wool shipped from Lake County passed through the Bailey and Massingill warehouse. They also shipped most of the county's grain from their warehouse.

In 1913, Massingill was still making regular trips between San Diego and Lakeview to oversee his various business interests. However, sometime during the next few years, he moved back to Lakeview. By 1922, Massingill was the county committee chairman for Lake County's Republican Party. That year, he represented the county at the state Republican convention in Portland, where he served on both the platform and resolutions committees. In 1925, he was appointed Lakeview's postmaster.

== Death and legacy ==
Massingill died of a heart attack on March 19, 1927, while attending a boxing match at the American Legion hall in Lakeview, Oregon. His funeral was held at the Antlers Club in Lakeview on March 23. The funeral included Elks ceremonies and Masonic rites. Massingill was buried in Lakeview's Independent Order of Odd Fellows community cemetery.

Today, the Bailey and Massingill General Store still stands in downtown Lakeview. The fire-resistant structure built by Massingill and his partner in 1900 was listed on the National Register of Historic Places in 1984.
