= William P. Heryford House =

Historic house in Oregon, United States

- U.S. National Register of Historic Places
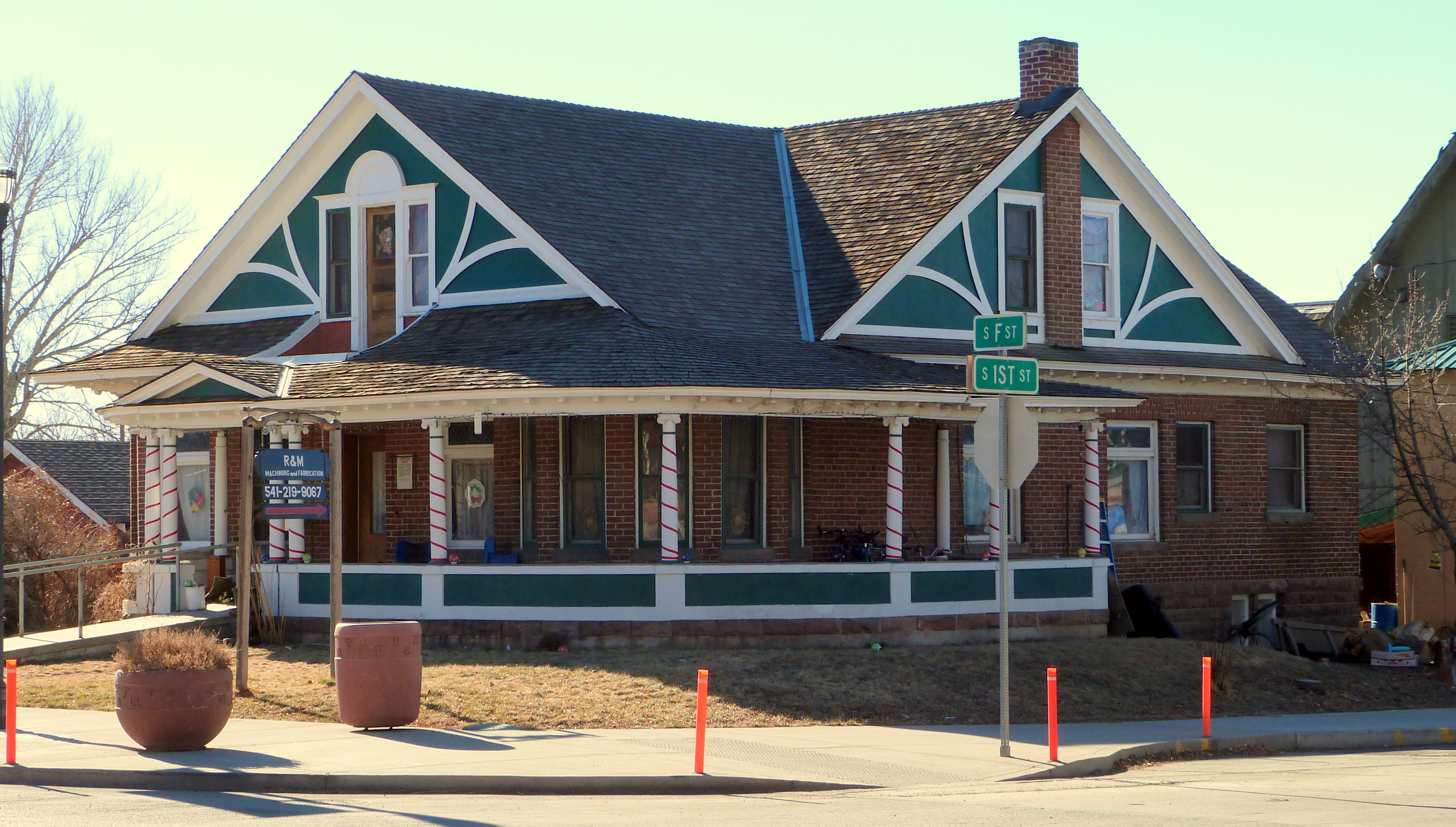
- The Heryford House in 2014

- Location within Oregon Location within the United States
- Location: 108 S. F Street; Lakeview, Oregon
- Coordinates: 42°11′18″N 120°20′47″W
- Area: less than one acre
- Built: 1911
- Architect: Underwood, I.A.
- Architectural style: Colonial Revival
- NRHP reference No.: 80003331
- Added to NRHP: May 22, 1980

The William P. Heryford House is a house located in Lakeview, Oregon, that is listed on the National Register of Historic Places.

== See also ==
- Heryford Brothers Building
- National Register of Historic Places listings in Lake County, Oregon
