= Eskelin =

Eskelin is a surname. Notable people with the surname include:

- Ellery Eskelin (born 1959), American tenor saxophonist
- Ian Eskelin (born 1969), American record producer, songwriter, and solo artist

== See also ==
- Ed Eskelin Ranch
