= Heryford Brothers Building =

- U.S. National Register of Historic Places
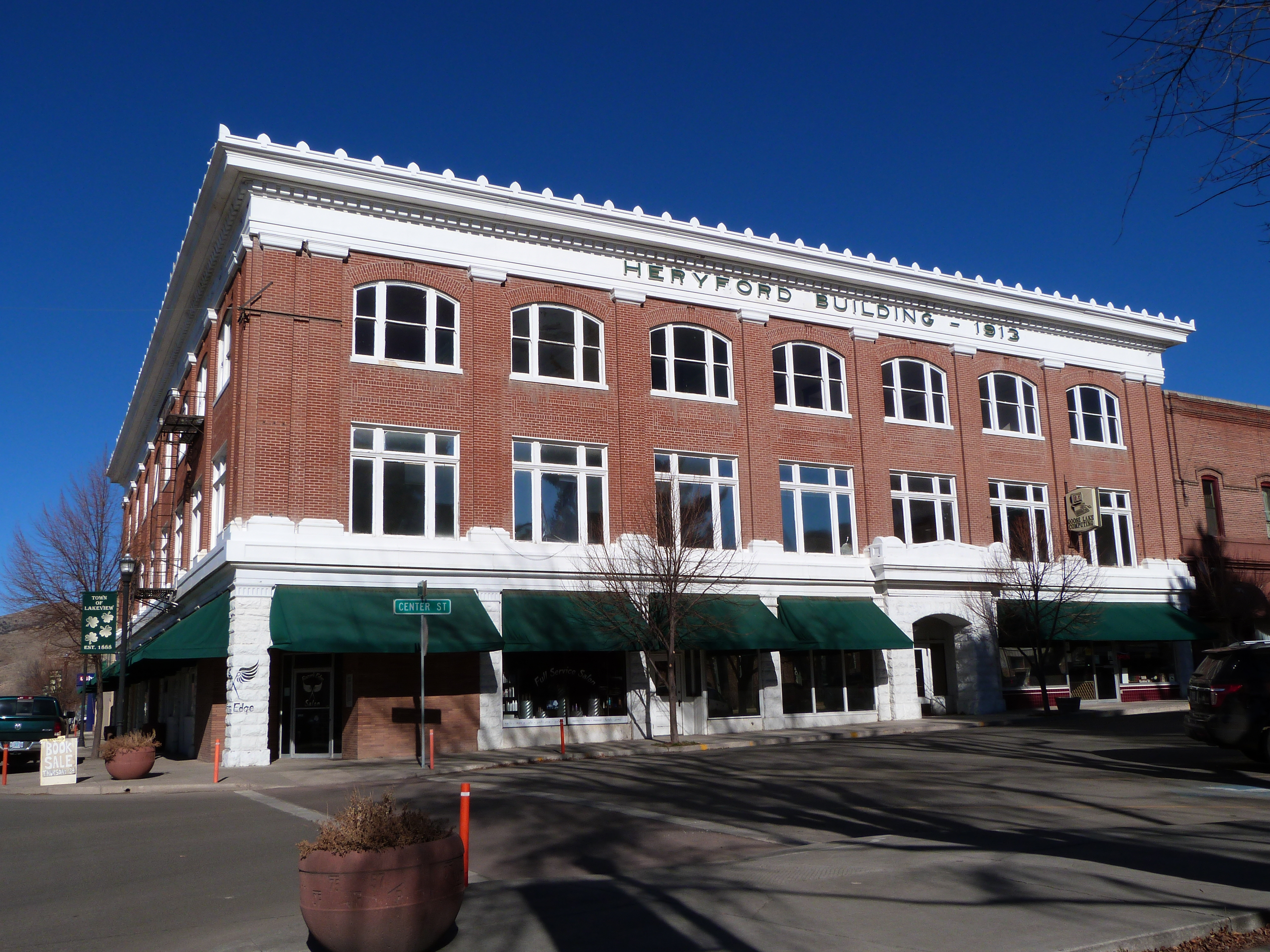
- The Heryford Brothers Building in 2014
- Location: 524 Center Street; Lakeview, Oregon
- Coordinates: 42°11′23″N 120°20′44″W
- Built: 1913
- Architect: F. S. DeLongchamp
- Architectural style: Classical Revival
- NRHP reference No.: 80003330
- Added to NRHP: 1980

The Heryford Brothers Building (also known locally as the Elks Building) is a historic commercial building in Lakeview, Oregon, United States. It was built in 1913 by William P. Heryford, a local rancher and businessman. The building has changed hands several times over the years, but it has remained in continuous use since it was constructed. Today, the Heryford Building is an active commercial structure for a number of small businesses. Because of its importance to local history, the Heryford Building is listed on the National Register of Historic Places.

== History ==
The town of Lakeview was established in 1876. The community grew slowly because of its isolated frontier location. In May 1900, a large fire destroyed 64 of the town's 66 buildings, leaving 700 residents homeless. However most of the homes and business structures were replaced by October of that year. Much of the reconstruction was financed by Doctor Bernard Daly, a local physician, banker, and businessman.

In 1908, a new county courthouse was built in the center of town on the south side of Center Street (the town's main east-west street) between E Street and F Street (the town's main north-south streets). In 1911, the Nevada–California–Oregon Railway reached Lakeview, spurring commercial growth in the community. In the two years following the arrival of the railroad, over $200,000 was invested in Lakeview's downtown business area. Almost half of that investment was made by William P. Heryford, a local rancher and businessman. In 1913, Heryford commissioned the construction of a new three-story commercial building on the north side of Center Street, across the street from the Lake County courthouse. Heryford's building cost approximately $100,000 to construct. When it was completed, the building was the largest and most expensive structure in Lakeview. It was also the most modern, with its own power generator, central stream heat, elevators, electric lights, hot water, and telephones.

The Heryford Brothers Building was dedicated on 14 March 1913. Over 600 people attended the ceremony. After the dedication ceremony, Heryford hosted a community party that lasted from 7:00 p.m. until 5:00 a.m the next morning. According to the Lake County Examiner, the event was "without a doubt the largest assemblage of beautifully gowned women ever gathered in Lakeview". The Examiner went on to speculate that Lakeview would never witness another such affair.

The Heryford building was the largest structure in Lakeview when it was built in 1913, and it is still one of the city's most important commercial building today. Because the Heryford Brothers Building played an important role in the commercial development of Lakeview, the structure was listed on the National Register of Historic Places on 30 April 1980.

== Structure ==
The Heryford Brothers Building is a three-story Classical Revival style structure with 54,000 square feet (5,000 m^{2}) of interior floor space. It was designed by San Francisco architect F. S. DeLongchamp, and constructed by I. A. (Andy) Underwood, a prominent Lakeview builder. When it was opened, the first floor was occupied by the Lakeview Mercantile Company, Lakeview's post office, and the Hall and Reynolds drug store. The United States Land Office and the local Elks Lodge occupied the second floor with professional offices on the third floor. The building included many features that were considered very modern, especially in an isolated eastern Oregon community in the early 20th century. These features included an electric power generator, central stream heat, elevators, telephones, electric lights, and hot water throughout the building.

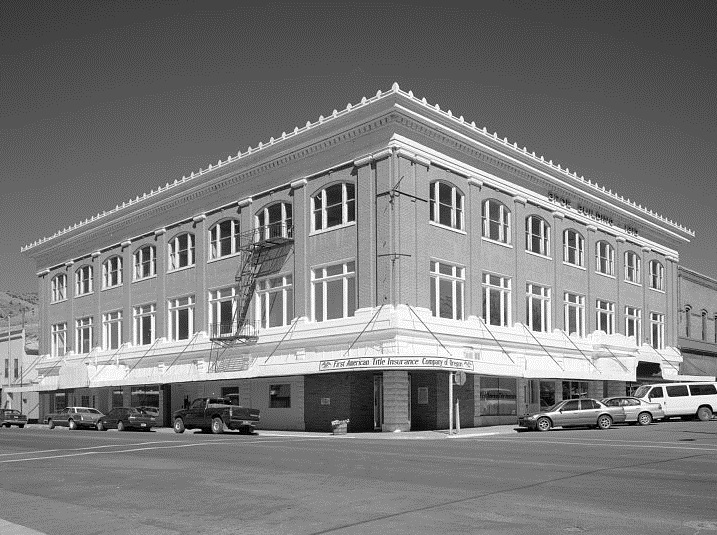
Heryford Building before sidewalk awning was removed

The building is a steel and masonry structure with a footprint measuring 107 feet (33 m) by 128 feet (39 m). The main entrance faces Center Street. It is flanked by rusticated stone pillars and matching arch with a classical header above the double-door entry. There are rusticated stone pillars between the ground floor windows with brick pilasters above. There is also an inset entryway at the southwest corner of the building, facing the Center Street and F Street intersection. A heavy wooden awning suspended over the sidewalks along the first floor frontage was added sometime after the original construction. It was removed sometime after 2001, restoring the exterior to its original form. The second floor has square-framed triple window groups with upper transom windows above the main panes. The windows are all mounted in pine casement frames. On the third floor, the triple window groups are repeated, but within rounded arch frames. The building's sheet metal cornices have elaborate entablature, frieze, and dentil elements. The building also has a full basement.

Over the years, the first floor has been extensively remodeled to accommodate new commercial tenants. The mercantile store was replaced by a restaurant, and then new commercial space. Later, the Elks Lodge expanded to the first floor. The first floor modifications include dropped ceilings, new sheetrock walls, wood paneling, and new bathrooms. The first floor space occupied by the drug store has changed hands several times, but retains its original configuration. With the exception of fire code modifications the second and third floors generally retain their original configurations as well.

== Location ==
The Heryford Brother Building occupies Lot A, Section 15, Township 39 South, Range 20 East of the Willamette Meridian in Lake County, Oregon. It is located on the north side of Center Street between E Street and F Street in Lakeview, Oregon. The building faces the Lake County Courthouse in the center of town.

== See also ==
- List of Oregon's Most Endangered Places
- National Register of Historic Places listings in Lake County, Oregon
- William P. Heryford House
