= Mark W. Bullard =

- Born: September 24, 1822; Stockbridge, Vermont
- Died: July 18, 1902 (aged 79); Menlo, Washington
- Other name: M. W. Bullard
- Occupations: Farmer and livestock rancher
- Known for: Founder of Lakeview, Oregon

Mark W. Bullard (September 24, 1822 – July 18, 1902), also known as M. W. Bullard, was an American pioneer who established homesteads in Oregon and Washington state. As a young man, he traveled from his family home in Vermont to California and then on to Oregon and Washington. He eventually settled in what is now Pacific County, Washington. He served in the Washington territorial militia during a regional Indian war in the mid-1850s. After the war, he moved to the Goose Lake Valley in south central Oregon. While there, he donated property to establish a new town that became Lakeview, Oregon, the county seat of Lake County. He later returned to his farm in Pacific County, Washington.

== Early life ==
Bullard was born in Stockbridge, Vermont, on September 24, 1822. His parents were Mark and Abigail (Whitcomb) Bullard. He grew up with three brothers and one sister.

In 1849, Bullard left Stockbridge with his brother Job, heading for America’s west coast. He traveled from Vermont to New York, where he booked passage on the steamship Restless bound for San Francisco. The journey took Bullard around the Cape Horn, arriving in San Francisco on 1 May 1850.

== West coast pioneer ==
After arriving in California, Bullard and his brother mined gold in the area around the American River before heading north to Oregon. They initially settled in Milwaukie, Oregon. After a year in that area, they left to begin mining along the Rogue River in southern Oregon.

In 1853, the brothers moved north again, this time to what is now Pacific County, Washington. They started logging in the Stuart Slough area; however, their business was not very successful. As a result, both brothers decided to take up 320 acres (130 ha) homestead claims in the Willapa Valley near what is now the community of Menlo, where they began farming. A short time later, their brother Seth traveled from Vermont to join them.

In 1855, Bullard joined the Washington militia to fight in a regional Indian war that lasted through 1856. He served as a private for six months in Company C (Mounted Rangers) of the 2nd Regiment, Washington Territorial Volunteers. His company was commanded by Captain Benjamin L. Henness with Colonel Benjamin Franklin Shaw as his regimental commander. During his service time, Bullard fought in several battles including a major engagement near Walla Walla in eastern Washington. When his enlistment expired, Bullard returned to his farm in Pacific County.

In 1860, a farmhand working on Bullard’s farm quit his job and demanded to be paid off in cash. Bullard did not want to pay in cash and an argument ensued. The employee drew his knife just as Bullard’s brother, Seth, come upon the scene. Seth attempted to disarm the man and was stabbed to death in the struggle.

After about a decade of farming in Pacific County, Bullard returned to the east coast to visit friends and family. He returned by steamship with an overland leg across the Isthmus of Panama, stopping in San Francisco before finally arriving in Astoria, Oregon, in December 1862. Bullard kept a daily journal of his east to west return trip.

== Lakeview founder ==
In 1869, Bullard moved to the Goose Lake Valley in south central Oregon. He was one of the first settlers to make his home in the valley. His first land claim was patented in January 1871. It included 160 acres (65 ha) located along what is now Bullard Creek near the mouth of Bullard Canyon at the north end of the valley. Bullard later acquired a second 160 acres (65 ha) land grant. His farm was mostly meadow land covered with tall native grass. Because of the lush environment, a wide range of wildlife was common on his land. Bullard enclosed his property with a crude fence and an irrigation ditch. He built a simple three-room log house on the property. The cabin had a living room for cooking and sleeping. The second room was used as a storage area and wood shed. The third area was a built-in livestock barn.

In 1874, the Oregon legislature created Lake County (which at that time, included today’s Lake County and neighboring Klamath County) from what had previously been eastern Jackson County. Linkville (now Klamath Falls, Oregon) was designated as the temporary county seat pending an election scheduled for 5 June 1876. Settlers in the Goose Lake Valley on the eastern side of the new county outnumbered those on the west side near Upper Klamath Lake; however, there was no town on the east side of the county while the west side had Linkville. To remedy this, Bullard offered to donate 20 acres (8.1 ha) to establish a new town at the north end of the Goose Lake Valley.

In the June election, most of the residents from the Klamath Lake area voted to keep the county seat at Linkville while east side residents voted for a variety of location in the Goose Lake Valley. The final vote was 120 votes for Bullard Creek, 88 votes for Linkville. However, a large number of voters wrote-in other names like Bullard’s Creek, Bullard Ranch, Goose Lake, and Goose Lake Valley. As a result, no site got a majority of the votes. In a community meeting on 10 August, residents of the Goose Lake Valley agreed that all the Bullard/Goose Lake related names should be counted as Bullard Creek votes. However, the county clerk in Linkville disagreed and ordered a new election. The second election was held on 7 November 1876. By then, residents of the Goose Lake Valley had decided to build the town of Lakeview at the Bullard Creek site and a rural post office had been established at the Bullard Ranch. In the November election, Lake County voters selected Lakeview over Linkville to be the county seat by a vote of 242 to 181.

On 7 December 1876, Bullard transferred the 20 acres (8.1 ha) parcel to Lake County and a two-story courthouse was built on the site. A short time later, Bullard sold his remaining 300 acres (120 ha) to John A. Moon, one of his neighbors. After Moon purchased Bullard’s property, he paid Frank Cheesman to survey the town site, and then filed an official plat for the town of Lakeview on 25 May 1877. The town of Lakeview developed around the property Bullard donated for the Lake County courthouse.

== Later life and legacy ==
Shortly after selling his Lake County property, Bullard returned to his farm in Pacific County, Washington. He resided on his own farm for a while and then lived with his brothers, Job and John, during his latter years. Bullard never married. He died on July 18, 1902, in Menlo, Washington.

Today, Bullard is considered the founder of Lakeview, Oregon, since the town was originally built on and around the property he donated for the county courthouse. There is also a street in Lakeview named in his honor. For many years, there was also a grade school in Lakeview named after Bullard. Bullard Creek and Bullard Canyon are geographic features at the north end of the Goose Lake Valley that still bear his name.
