= Virgil Conn =

State legislator representing south-central Oregon

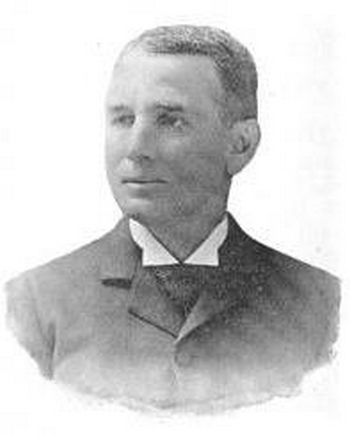
- Oregon legislator Virgil Conn, 1895

Member of the Oregon House of Representatives from the 22nd district
- In office 1895–1898
- Preceded by: Bernard Daly
- Succeeded by: William A. Massingill

Personal details
- Born: January 31, 1847 Royal Center, Indiana, US
- Died: February 27, 1931 (aged 84) Alturas, California, US
- Party: Republican
- Profession: Businessman

Virgil Conn (January 31, 1847 – February 27, 1931) was an American businessman and state legislator from the state of Oregon. He served two two-year terms in the Oregon House of Representatives as a Republican legislator, representing a large rural district in south-central Oregon. He also ran a general store in Paisley, Oregon, and was that town's postmaster for many years. Later in his life, he owned a dairy farm near Roseburg, Oregon.

== Early life ==
Conn was born in Royal Center, Indiana, on January 31, 1847, the son of Henry ("Harry") Conn and Mary Jane (Stultz) Conn. In 1854, he moved with his family to Oregon, crossing the country in a covered wagon. The family settled in Douglas County near Roseburg, where his parents filed a donation land claim.

Conn's father was a dedicated member of the Free Soil Party. Later, he was active in organizing the Union Party, which evolved into the Republican Party. Following in his father's footsteps, Conn became a lifelong Republican. He was well educated, having attended Willamette University in Salem, Oregon. While at the university, he met many individuals who went on to serve in positions of public trust. He graduated from Willamette in 1867.

== Businessman ==
After graduating from college, Conn returned to Roseburg where he began his business career. He first went to work for Flood and Company, a dry goods business in Roseburg. Later, he worked as a bookkeeper for H. Marks and Company, another Roseburg firm.

While in Roseburg, Conn also became active in politics and government affairs, running for local office and supporting Republican candidates. In 1871, Conn was appointed deputy United States marshal for the Southern Oregon District. In 1878, he was elected as a trustee for the city of Roseburg. In addition, Conn was a strong supporter of James A. Garfield when he ran for President of the United States in 1880. That was the same year, he married Mary Frances Long of Logansport, Indiana. Together they had two daughters.

In 1882, Conn relocated east of the Cascade Mountains to Paisley in Lake County. He resided there for the next 40 years. Over the years, he became one of the community's leading businessmen. Initially, Conn went to work for his brother George who had opened a general store in Paisley a year earlier. Conn became a full partner with his brother in 1883. Conn later bought out his brother's interest in the business. His brother then opened a new store, also in downtown Paisley. During this same time period, the brothers established a flourmill in Paisley. In 1885, Conn was appointed Paisley's postmaster, a position he held for 33 years. Conn became a notary public in 1889.

Conn was also active in several fraternal organizations. He was a member of the local Elks lodge. He was also a Mason and a member of the Al Kader Shriners Temple.

== Political career ==
Conn actively supported the Republican Party and its candidates all his life. In 1894, he decided to run for a seat in the Oregon House of Representatives, representing District 22, which included Lake and Klamath counties in rural south-central Oregon. To that end, he attended the 1894 state Republican convention held in Salem as a delegate representing Lake County. The convention nominated him to represent the party in the House District 22 election. In the general election, Conn defeated the Democratic incumbent Bernard Daly.

Conn took his seat in the Oregon House on January 14, 1895, representing District 22. He served through the 1895 regular legislative session which ended on February 23. During the session, Conn served on the assessments and taxation, education, and irrigation committees. In addition, he sponsored a comprehensive homestead bill. After the session closed, Conn voiced his disappointment in the legislature's Republican leadership in the state senate for holding up action on important bills to reorganize state commissions and amend tax laws.

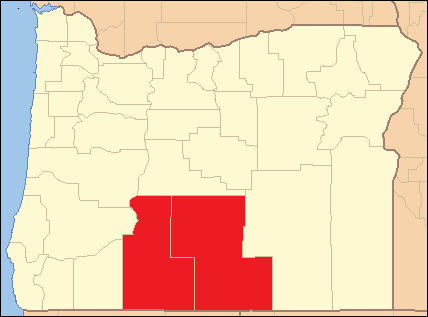
Oregon House District 22, 1895–1898

In 1896, Conn decided to run for the state senate seat in Senate District 8, representing Lake, Klamath, and Crook counties (at that time, Crook County included what are now Crook, Deschutes, and Jefferson counties). That year, Republican candidates for the legislature were nominated at a state convention in Portland. Conn was unsuccessful in his bid to become the Republican nominee for the District 8 senate seat. However, he was nominated to run for re-election as the Republican candidate in House District 22.

In the general election, Conn faced two opponents. J. A. Larabee was a populist People's Party candidate and J. L. Hanks ran as a Democrat. The election was extremely close with Conn winning by only three votes. In the final count, Conn received 626 votes; Larabee fell just short with 623; and Hanks trailed well behind with 309 votes.

Oregon's 1897 regular legislative session opened on January 11. Conn served through the legislative session which ended on March 2. During the session, Republicans held 39 of the 60 House seats with the remaining seats divided between the Progressive Party with 13 seats and the Democrats with 4 seats along with 4 members of the Union Party. Despite the substantial Republican majority, the 1897 session was a complete failure. The House membership was divided into two mixed-party factions. Neither group had sufficient members to form a quorum and neither clique would answer roll call when the other was present. As a result, the House was unable to organize or elect a speaker. Consequently, no business was conducted during the session. This included the failure to elect a United States senator. As a result, Oregon went for over a year with only one senator representing the state in the United States Senate. At the end of the 1897 session, Conn was appointed to a special six-person committee that drafted a statement to the people of Oregon announcing the legislature's failure to elect a senator or produce any legislation.

After the close of the 1897 legislative session, several newspapers mentioned Conn as a possible candidate for governor or Oregon Secretary of State. However, the delegates at the 1898 Republican state convention did not nominate him for any statewide office.

== Later life ==
After leaving state politics, Conn continued to operate his mercantile business in Paisley. In 1900, Conn built a large new store in downtown Paisley. He also continued as a leader in the local business community. He helped found the Northern Lake County Board of Commerce in 1908 and was elected that organization's first president.

Conn also remained active in public affairs. For example, Governor Theodore Geer appointed Conn as a delegate to the 1902 Oregon Irrigation Congress, representing Lake County. In 1915, Governor James Withycombe appointed Conn as the Lake County delegate to the Oregon-California Land Grant Conference which was charged with recommending changes to the state's land grant laws. After 33 years of service, Conn retired as Paisley's postmaster in 1918.

Conn and his wife moved back to Roseburg in 1924. They purchased a 211-acre (85 ha) dairy farm with frontage along the South Umpqua River. Four years later, his wife died at their apartment in Roseburg on March 8, 1928.

Conn was in poor health for several years, prior to his death. Just a few weeks before he died, Conn sold his dairy farm and moved from Roseburg to Alturas, California, to live with his daughter. Conn died at his daughter's home in Alturas on February 27, 1931. After his death, his body was returned to Roseburg for burial. He was buried in Roseburg's Masonic cemetery.
