= Bailey and Massingill General Store =

- U.S. National Register of Historic Places
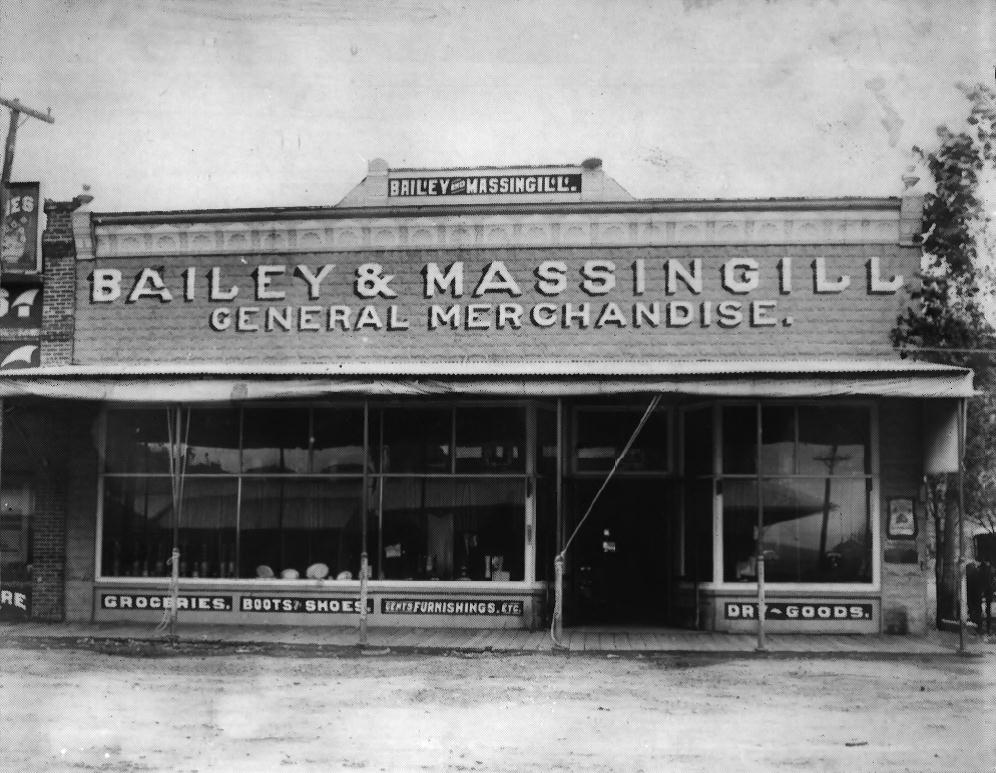
- The Bailey and Massingill General Store in 1917
- Location: 4 N. E Street; Lakeview, Oregon
- Coordinates: 42°11′23″N 120°20′41″W
- Area: Less than 1 acre (0.40 ha)
- Built: 1900; 126 years ago
- Architectural style: Commercial style, with Italianate details
- NRHP reference No.: 84000133
- Added to NRHP: October 25, 1984; 41 years ago

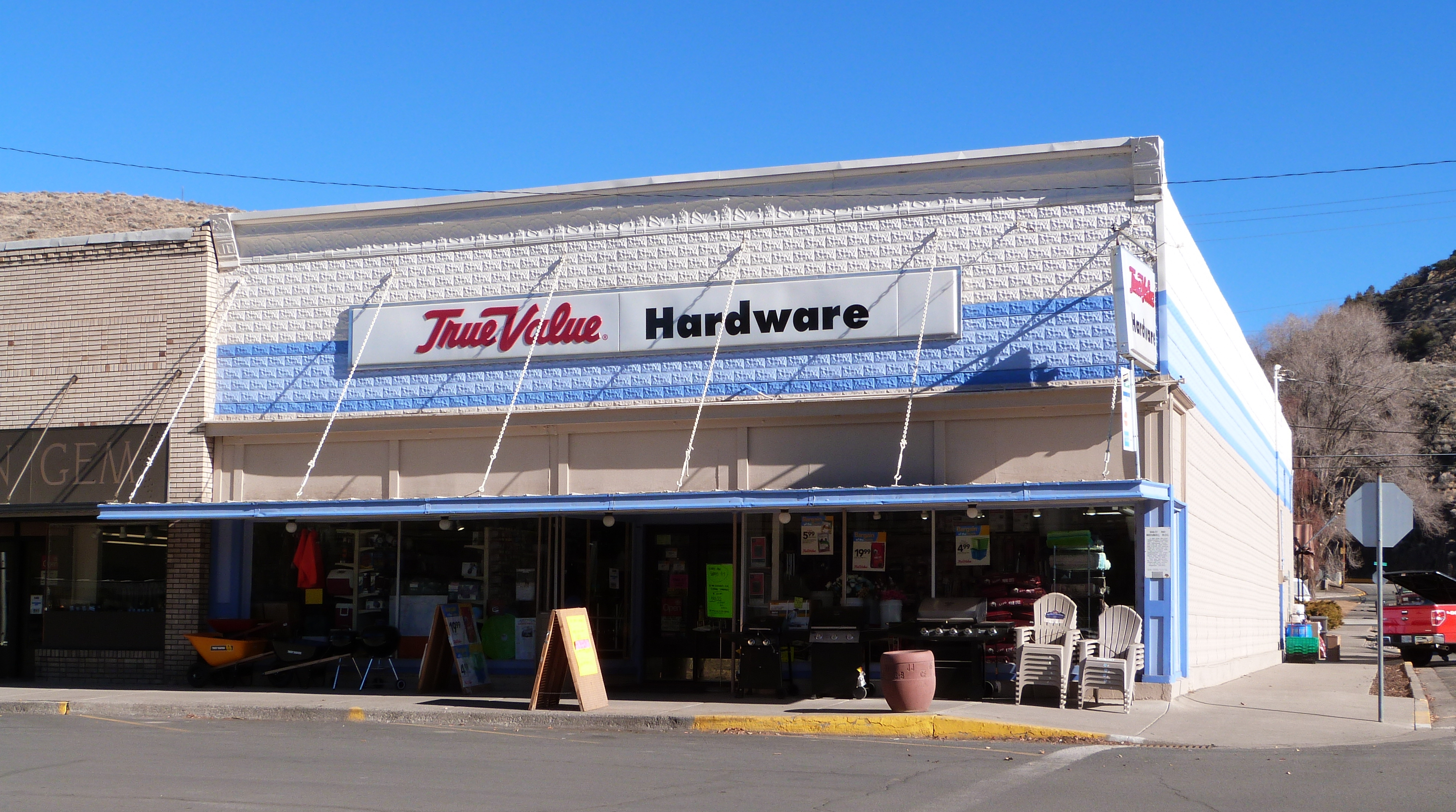
True Value at location in 2014

The Bailey and Massingill General Store is a historic commercial building in downtown Lakeview, Oregon, United States. Lakeview's first commercial establishment opened on the same site in 1876, and was purchased by partners Harry Bailey and W. A. Massingill in 1897. A large fire on the night of May 22, 1900, destroyed much of Lakeview, and Bailey and Massingill suffered the largest financial loss in town ($18,000) with the complete destruction of their store. The partners immediately rebuilt their business, opening the present building on the same site in the same year. Drawing lessons from the fire, they incorporated a unique set of fire preventive features into the new building, including metal-sheathed walls and a fire awning (no longer present) that could be dropped to protect the windows and entry. With these features, the building successfully survived another large fire in 1902, and continued as one of Lakeview's most important commercial enterprises.

The store was listed on the National Register of Historic Places in 1984.

== See also ==
- National Register of Historic Places listings in Lake County, Oregon
