= Post and King Saloon =

- U.S. National Register of Historic Places
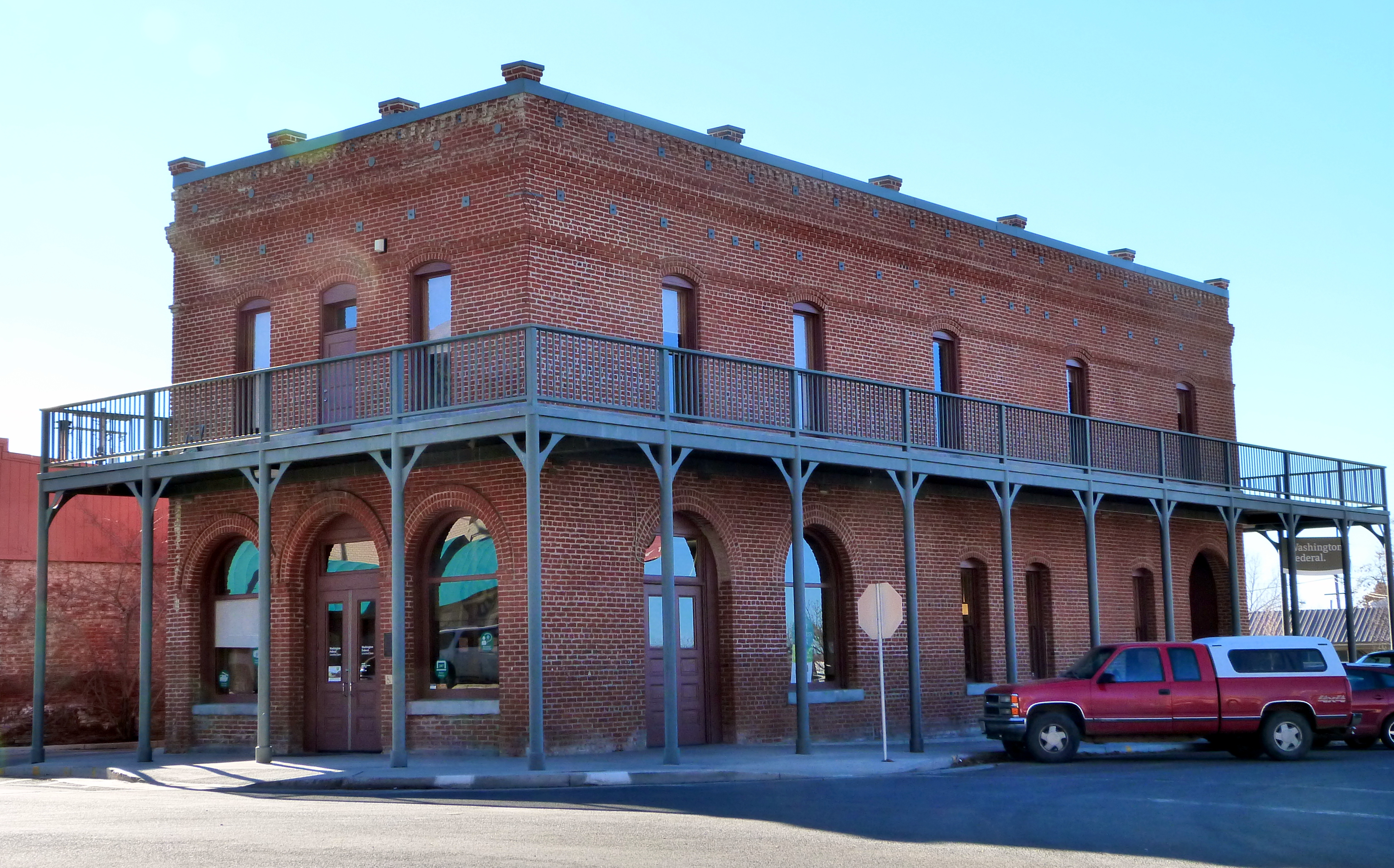
- The Post and King Saloon building in 2014

- Location within Oregon Location within the United States
- Location: 103 N. E Street; Lakeview, Oregon
- Coordinates: 42°11′27″N 120°20′43″W
- Area: 0.2 acres (0.081 ha)
- Built: 1901
- Architect: Post, Peter; King, Jonas
- Architectural style: Italianate
- NRHP reference No.: 77001104
- Added to NRHP: March 17, 1977

The Post and King Saloon is a building located in Lakeview, Oregon, listed on the National Register of Historic Places.

== See also ==
- National Register of Historic Places listings in Lake County, Oregon
