= Lake County Round Sale Barn =

- U.S. National Register of Historic Places
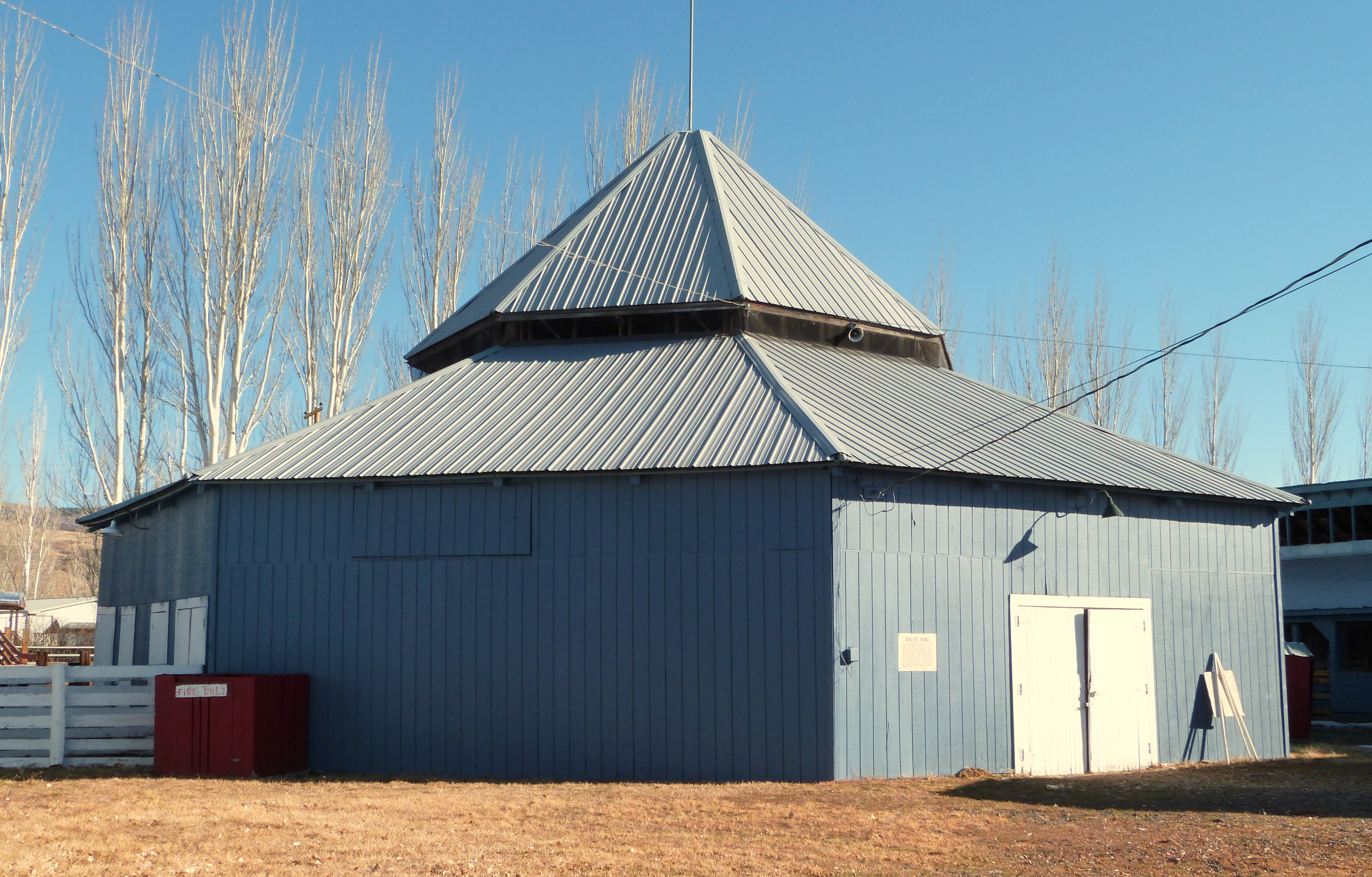
- The barn in 2014

- Location within Oregon Location within the United States
- Location: 3531 S. 6th Street; Lakeview, Oregon
- Coordinates: 42°11′43″N 120°21′40″W
- Area: less than one acre
- Built: 1942
- Architect: Sinnard, Herbert Reeves
- NRHP reference No.: 03001180
- Added to NRHP: November 21, 2003

The Lake County Round Sale Barn is a building located in Lakeview, Oregon listed on the National Register of Historic Places. The barn was added to the list on November 21, 2003.

== See also ==
- National Register of Historic Places listings in Lake County, Oregon
