= Ed Eskelin Ranch =

- Ed Eskelin Ranch Complex
- U.S. National Register of Historic Places
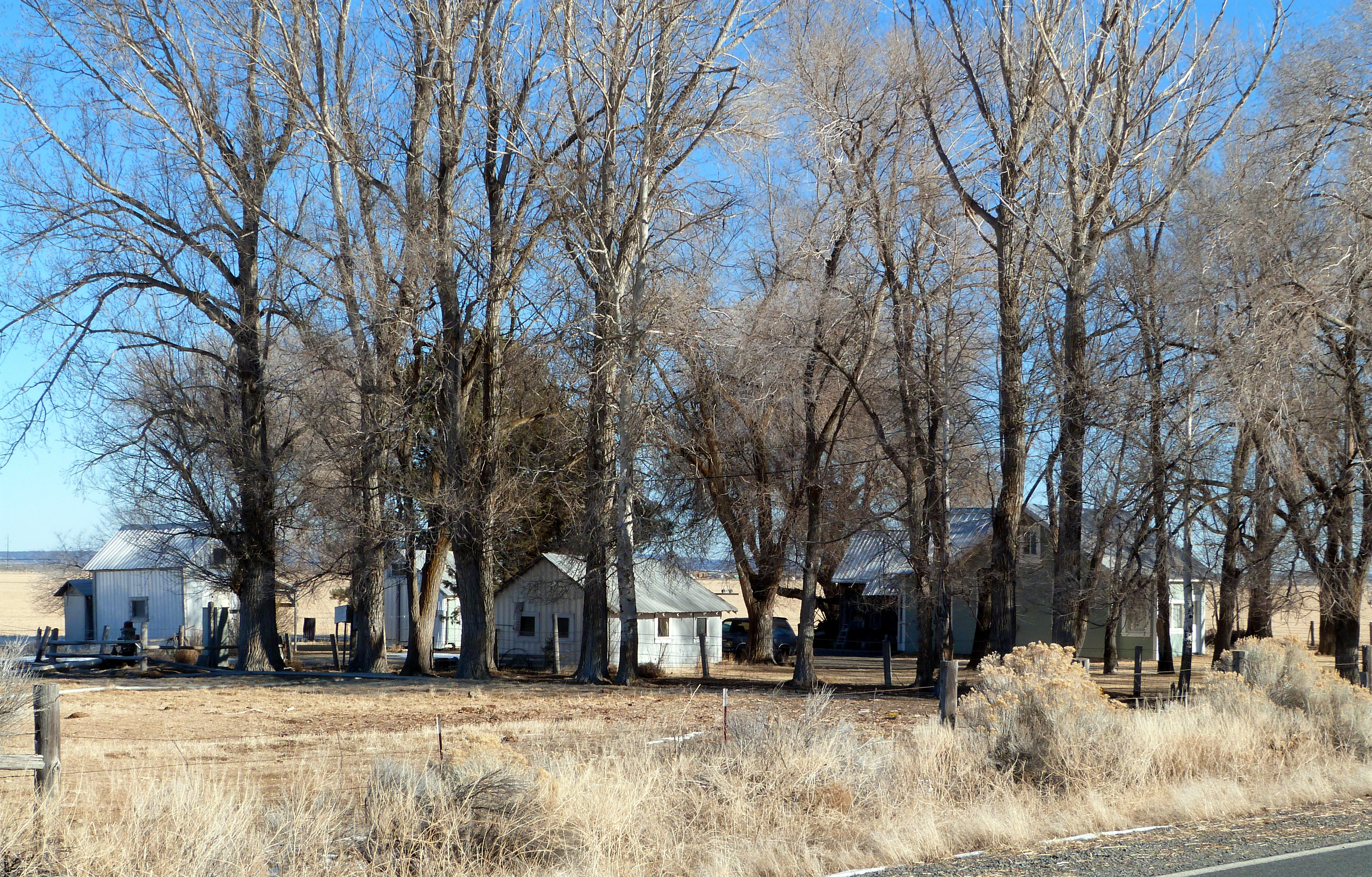
- The ranch in 2014

- Location within Oregon Location within the United States
- Location: County Road 5-10; Silver Lake, Oregon, vicinity
- Nearest city: La Pine, Oregon
- Coordinates: 43°15′02″N 120°54′42″W
- Area: 2.0 acres (0.81 ha)
- Built: ca. 1910–1947
- Architectural style: Pole, box frame, balloon frame, platform frame
- NRHP reference No.: 91000062
- Added to NRHP: February 25, 1991

The Ed Eskelin Ranch is a historic residential and agricultural complex in Lake County, Oregon, United States. As a historic resource, the complex captures elements of two different phases of early 20th century settlement in the Fort Rock basin. It represents the perseverance and resourcefulness required of modest-scale ranchers and farmers in frontier conditions and during economic hardship. Architecturally, the ranch preserves excellent examples of the construction styles and knowledge in use by common homesteaders in the period, as well as elements of the Finnish cultural heritage of the region.

== History ==
The first influx of settlers began around 1909, driven by the 1909 Enlarged Homestead Act and the 1916 Stock-Raising Homestead Act, as well as Union Pacific Railroad promotion (Note: The prospect of a rail line through the Fort Rock basin was never realized.) and publicity from the Lewis and Clark Centennial Exposition of 1905. Prominent among the settler population in this period were Finnish and Norwegian immigrant farmers including Fred Eskelin. (Note: Fred Eskelin, birth name Frederick Eskelinen, emigrated from Iisalmi, Finland, to Calumet, Michigan, in 1887, where he worked as a miner. He married Marie Elise Lievonen in 1904, and their sons Edwin (Ed) and John were born prior to Fred's 1909 arrival in the Fort Rock Valley.) However, many settlers were drawn by the unusually wet weather in years before 1909; (Note: The years between 1900 and 1906 saw record rainfall and excellent farming and ranching conditions.) when precipitation returned to its long-term, semiarid average, the large majority of settlers, including the Eskelin family, were unable to sustain agricultural operations in the dry conditions and abandoned their homesteads. (Note: The Eskelins' departure was hastened when Marie Eskelin became ill with, but survived, the influenza of 1918.)

The second phase of settlement came in the 1930s with new approaches to irrigation that enabled production in the near-desert conditions of the Fort Rock basin. During this time, Fred and Ed Eskelin returned to the basin with their families (Note: In the interim between their two ventures in the Fort Rock basin, the Eskelin family had settled near Woodland, Washington.) and established a well drilling business alongside their agricultural operations. They built a new homestead, with both new construction as well as salvaging materials and whole buildings from disused properties around the area. (Note: The use of salvaged buildings and materials was encouraged by the federal Bankhead–Jones Act of 1935, which authorized the transfer of salvage to local landowners for the cost of removal. The federal government had purchased a number of failed homesteads from the first phase of settlement in the Fort Rock basin.) The new homestead was laid out on a plan derived from traditional compounds in Finland; this Old World design provides a last link to the ethnic character of the first phase of settlement, which was all but extinguished except for the Eskelins. The success of this new venture led to Ed Eskelin's role as a prominent citizen in the basin, and to the long-term preservation of the homestead compound.

The complex was listed on the National Register of Historic Places in 1991.

== Historic features ==
Historic features of the ranch complex include:

- House — Built as a school 1913, relocated to current site 1938, remodeled 1939
- Barn — Built 1938, expanded 1947
- Granary — Built as a house ca. 1910, relocated to current site and repurposed 1937
- Privy — Built 1913 (along with house), relocated to current site 1939
- Garage — Built ca. 1912–1915, relocated to current site 1940
- Well derrick — Built ca. 1935
- Well drilling machine — Built 1934–1935
- Windbreak and shade trees — Planted ca. 1935
- Irrigation ditches — Dug ca. 1935 – ca. 1940
- Shop building — Built 1945 from lumber salvaged from the 1910 Finley Homestead (Note: In contrast to the Eskelin Ranch's other historic features, the shop and woodshed buildings were listed in the ranch's 1990 National Register nomination as historic but noncontribuing resources. This designation reflects the National Register's 50-year age criterion for listing (the buildings had been in place as part of the Eskelin Ranch for 45 years at the time of nomination) rather than any minimization of the buildings' actual historic value.)
- Woodshed — Built ca. 1910 as a homestead cabin, relocated to current site and repurposed 1945

== See also ==
- National Register of Historic Places listings in Lake County, Oregon
