= Cabin Lake Guard Station =

- U.S. National Register of Historic Places
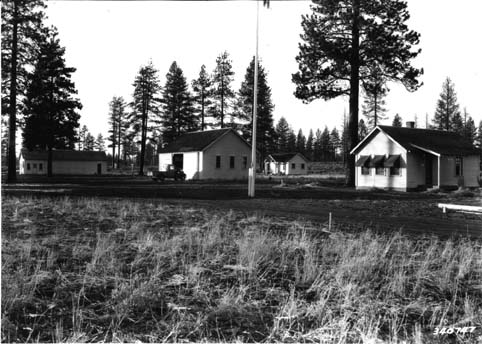
- Cabin Lake Ranger Station in 1935
- Location: Deschutes National Forest
- Nearest city: Bend, Oregon, USA
- Coordinates: 43.49056°N 121.05861°W
- Built: 1934 -1938
- Architectural style: Simple rustic
- NRHP reference No.: 86000827
- Added to NRHP: 1986

The Cabin Lake Guard Station is a Forest Service compound consisting of six simple rustic buildings located in the Deschutes National Forest in central Oregon. It was originally built as a district ranger station for the Fort Rock Ranger District. It was later converted to a summer guard station. The guard station is now closed, but the adjacent campground is open. While still very remote, it is a popular location for bird watching and nature photography. The Cabin Lake Guard Station is listed on the National Register of Historic Places.

== History ==
In the 1920s and 1930s, forest road networks were not well developed. To facilitate work in National Forests, the Forest Service built district ranger stations at strategic locations within the forest to house full-time employees and provide logistics support to fire patrols and project crews working at remote forest sites. After World War II, the Forest Service greatly expanded its road network, allowing employees to get to most forest areas within a few hours. As a result, many of the more isolated ranger stations were closed or converted to summer guard station.

The Cabin Lake Guard Station is located in the Deschutes National Forest forty miles southeast of Bend, Oregon. It was originally built as a district ranger station, and served as the headquarters for the Fort Rock Ranger District from 1921 until 1945. Throughout most of that time, there were five full-time rangers living and working at the site.

From 1934 to 1938, a Civilian Conservation Corps camp was located adjacent to the ranger station. The existing guard station buildings were constructed by Civilian Conservation Corps work crews during that time. The Civilian Conservation Corps built a total of seven buildings for the ranger station compound including ranger residences, a warehouse, maintenance shop, and a gas station. Six of the seven structures remain today. The seventh building was moved to another guard station after the ranger station was closed.

In 1945, the district headquarters was moved to Bend, and the ranger station was converted to a guard station. It was used as a bunkhouse and supply station for Forest Service fire crews that patrolled the surrounding forest during summer fire season. The Forest Service closed the guard station in 2002. Today, the guard station site is unoccupied. However, Forest Service archaeologists are working with volunteers to renovate the guard station facilities. Once the buildings are restored, the Forest Service may open two of the ranger residences for use as recreation rental cabins.

Because of the rustic architecture of the remaining six buildings and the site's unique historic value as an early Forest Service ranger station, the Cabin Lake Guard Station was listed on the National Register of Historic Places in 1986.

== Structures ==
The Cabin Lake Guard Station is located in a very remote area of the Deschutes National Forest near the forest's boundary with high desert public lands managed by the Bureau of Land Management's Lakeview District. The guard station is made up of six main buildings and several minor structures surrounded by relatively open forest land. The elevation at the site is 4,510 feet. The forest around the guard station is Ponderosa pine and western juniper with sagebrush, antelope bitterbrush, Idaho fescue, and bluebunch wheatgrass as the primary ground cover (picture).

The guard station buildings are wood-frame structures with concrete foundations. The exteriors are covered with weatherboard. Wooden shingles are used for roofing. All the buildings except one are painted light green with dark brown trim (picture) so they blend into the surrounding forest landscape. One residence is painted a cream color with brown trim (picture). The interior rooms of the ranger residences have pine paneling with a brick fireplace in the living room. Several of the residences still have simple furnishings, including wooden chairs and tables (picture). In addition to the ranger residences, there is a warehouse (picture), maintenance shop (picture), gas station, and several other minor structures that make up the guard station compound.

There is a Forest Service campground next to the historic guard station. The campground has 14 primitive camp sites. However, there is no water or toilet facilities available at the site. The dirt road leading the guard station can be rough. Two-wheel-drive vehicles can usually make the trip from April through November. A four-wheel-drive vehicle is recommended the rest of the year.

== Bird watching ==
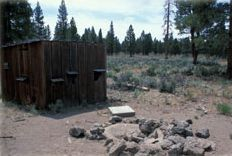
Bird blind near Cabin Lake Guard Station

There are two permanent bird blinds located within easy walking distance of the guard station. The blinds are located approximately 300 feet apart. They are 8 feet by 12 feet covered shelters with veiled window openings allowing observers to view and photograph birds from a distance of 15–20 feet. To attract birds, each blind has a small concrete basin called a guzzler that fills with water from a nearby storage tank that is fed by water collection aprons.

Because Cabin Lake Guard Station is located on the border between the eastern Cascade pine forests and the high desert eco-systems, the guzzler's water attracts an unusually wide range of birds typical of both environments. Among the birds common to the site are Lewis's woodpecker, white-headed woodpecker, hairy woodpecker, northern flicker, gray flycatcher, loggerhead shrike, Clark's nutcracker, mourning dove, pygmy nuthatch, Steller's jay, pinyon jay, Canada jay, common poorwill, green-tailed towhee, mountain chickadee, Brewer's sparrow, chipping sparrow, white-crowned sparrow, Cassin's finch, red crossbill, mountain bluebird, western bluebird, yellow-rumped warbler, and Townsend's solitaire. Many bird photographs used in Wikipedia articles were taken at the Cabin Lake viewing blind.

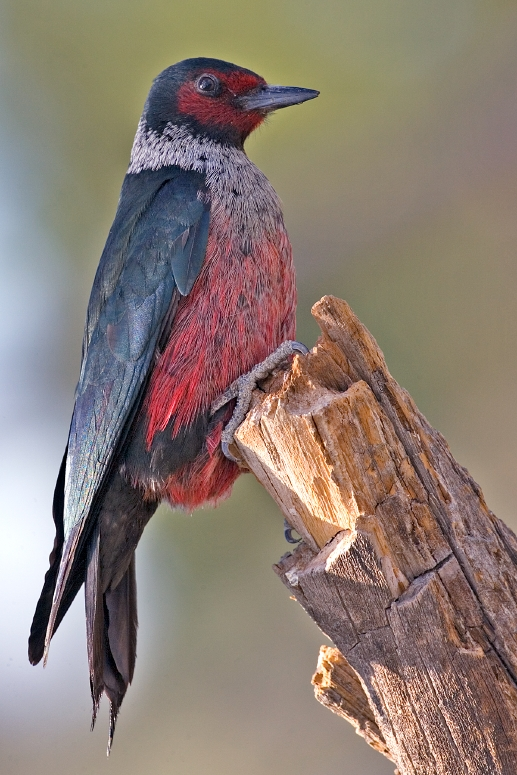
*Lewis's woodpecker

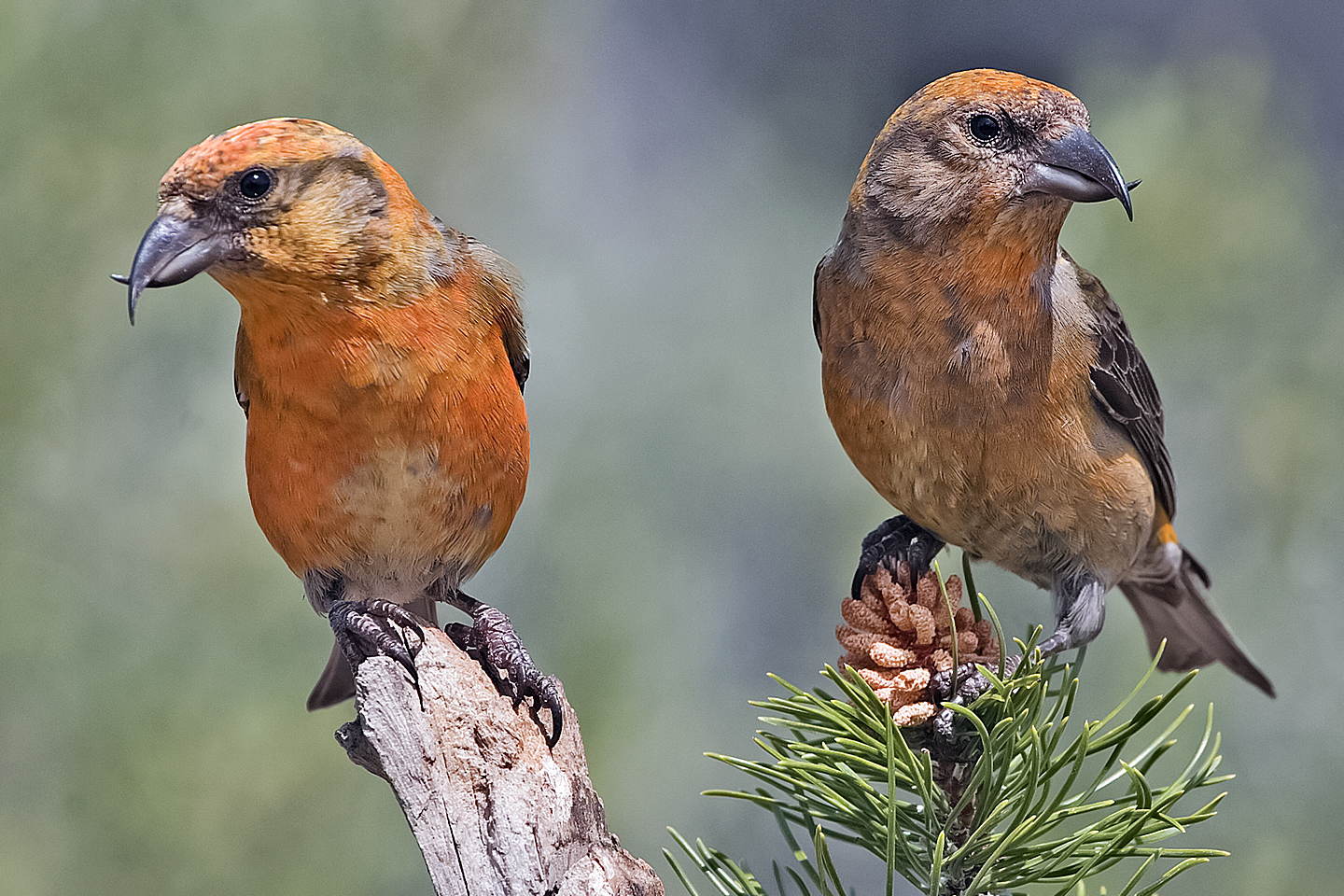
*Red crossbills

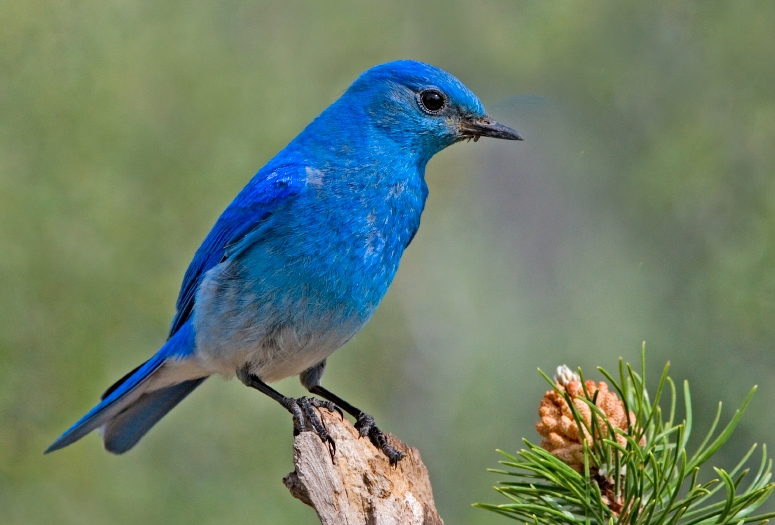
*Mountain bluebird

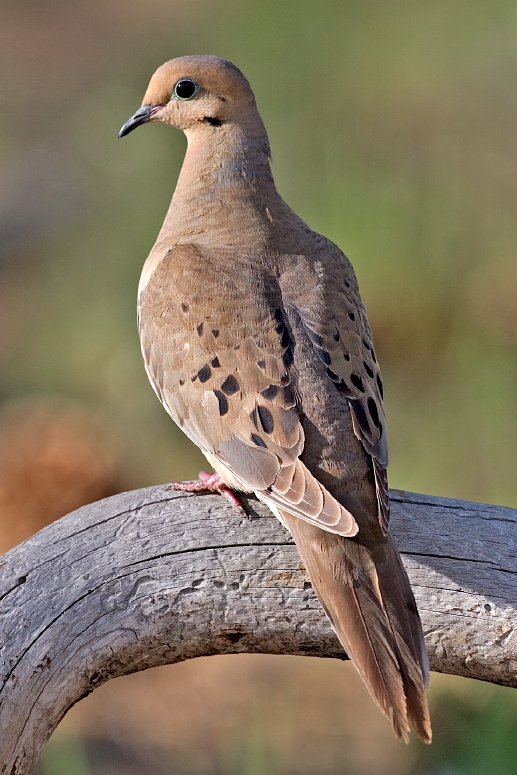
*Mourning dove

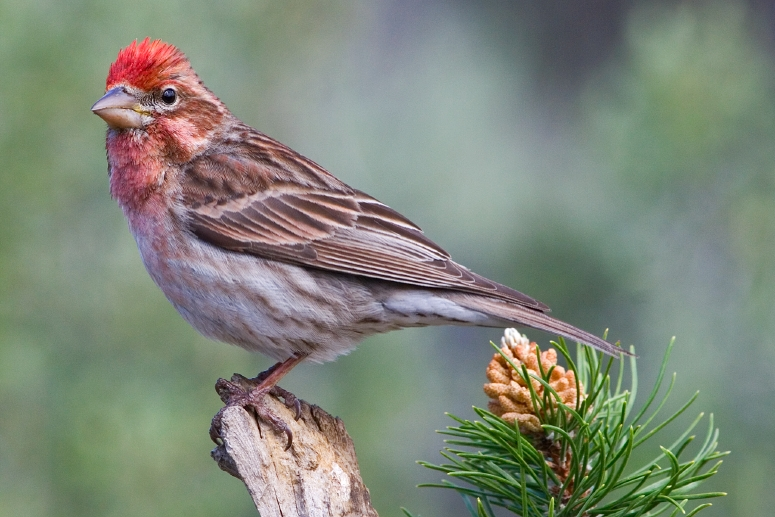
*Cassin's finch

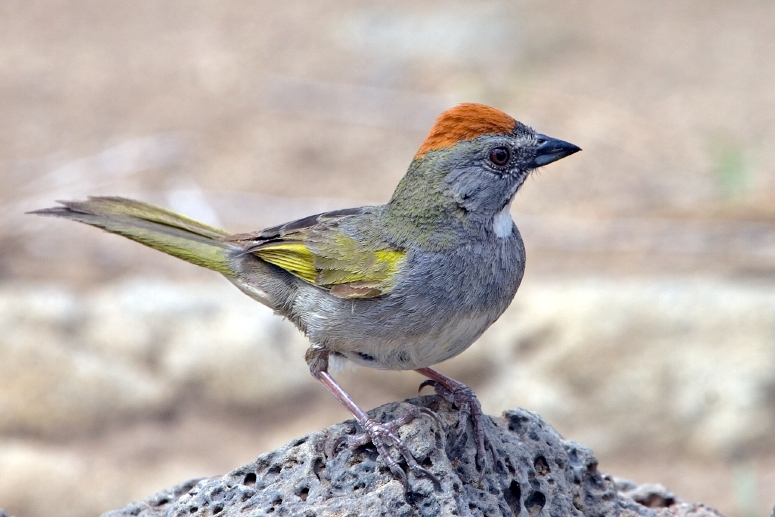
*Green-tailed towhee

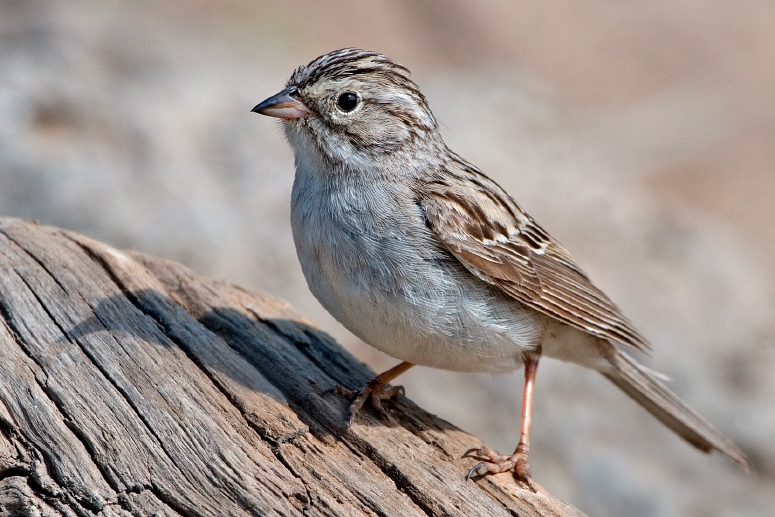
*Brewer's sparrow

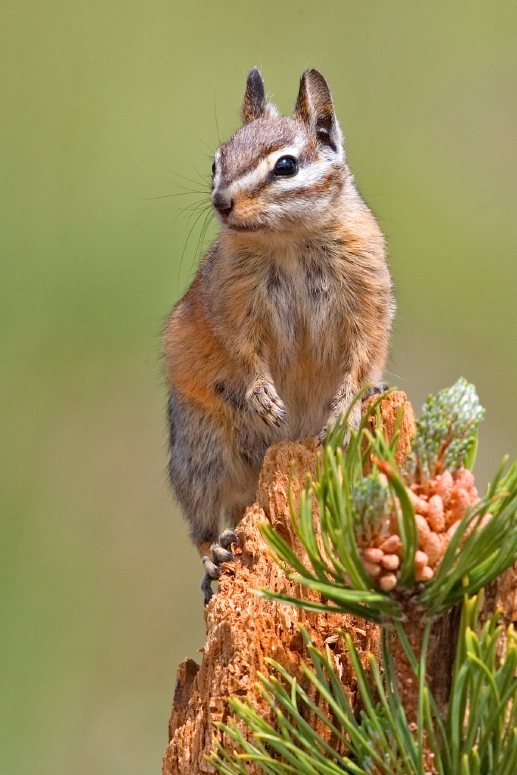
*Least chipmunk

Thirsty mammals also use the guzzlers. During the day, the most common wildlife seen from the blinds are least chipmunk, yellow-pine chipmunk, golden-mantled ground squirrel, and American badger. In evening, mule deer, bushy-tailed woodrats, deer mice, and several species of bats coming to drink at the guzzlers.
