= Lake County Airport (Oregon) =

Coordinates: 42°09′40″N 120°23′57″W

- IATA: LKV; ICAO: KLKV; FAA LID: LKV

Summary
- Airport type: Public
- Owner: Lake County
- Location: Lakeview, Oregon
- Elevation AMSL: 4,734 ft (1,443 m)
- Website: https://www.lakecountyor.org/government/airport/index.php
- Interactive map of Lake County Airport

Runways
Direction	Length		Surface
Direction	ft	m	Surface
17/35	5,318	1,621	Asphalt

Statistics (2019)
- Aircraft operations (year ending 6/9/2019): 6,000
- Based aircraft: 17
- Source: Federal Aviation Administration

Lake County Airport (IATA: LKV, ICAO: KLKV, FAA LID: LKV) is a public airport three miles (5 km) southwest of Lakeview, in Lake County, Oregon.

== Facilities ==
Lake County Airport covers 1,000 acres (405 ha) and has one asphalt runway: 17/35 is 5,318 x 100 ft. (1,621 x 30 m).

In the year ending June 9, 2019, the airport had 6,000 aircraft operations, average 16 per day: 80% general aviation and 20% air taxi. In that period, 17 aircraft were based at the airport: 14 single-engine, 2 multi-engine, and 1 helicopter.
