= Lakeview, Oregon =

- City
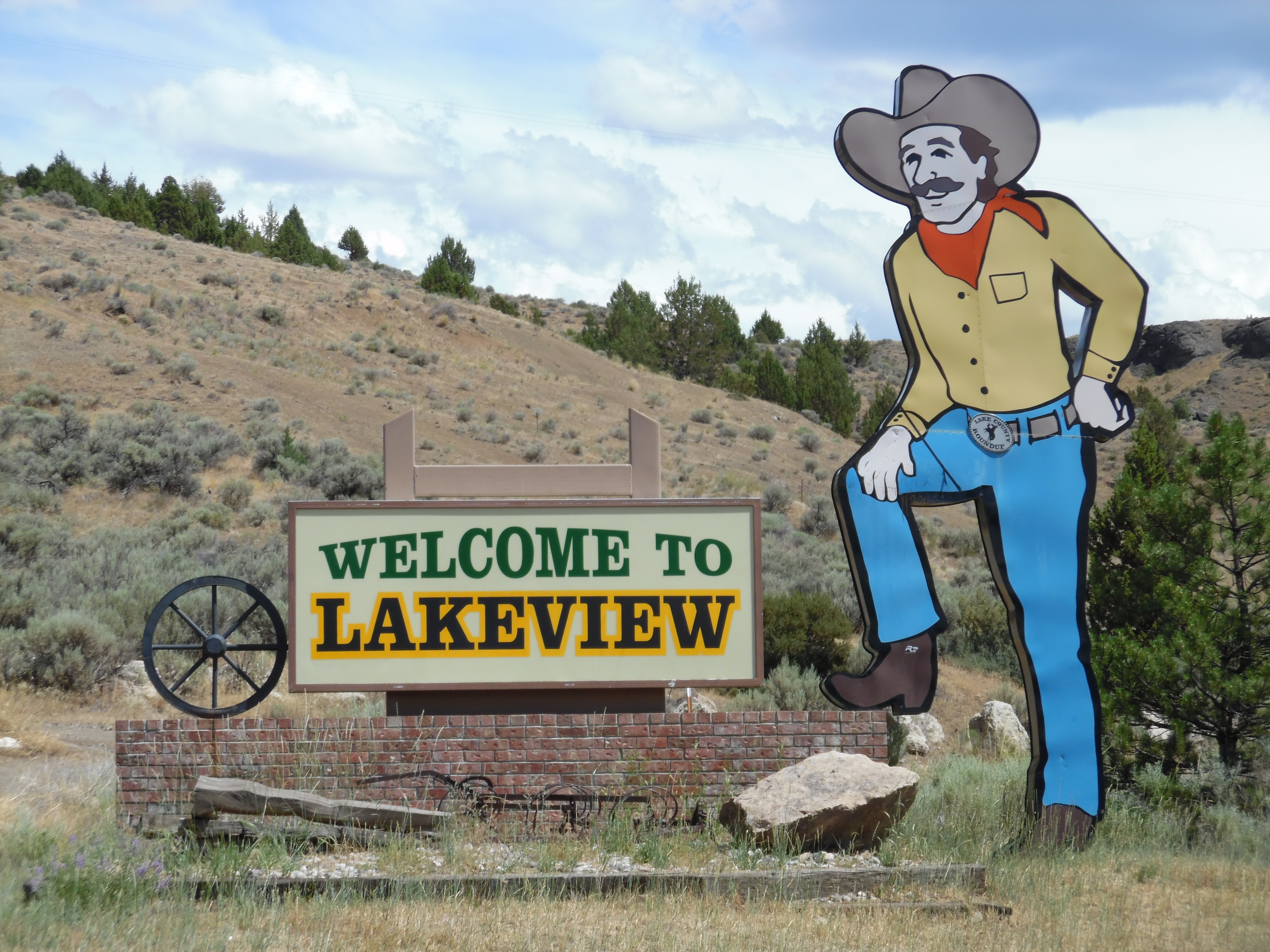
- Welcome sign at the north end of town
- Nickname: The Tallest Town in Oregon
- Location in Lake County, Oregon
- Coordinates: 42°11′30″N 120°21′10″W
- Country: United States
- State: Oregon
- County: Lake
- Incorporated: 1889

Government
  - Mayor: Ray Turner

Area
  - Total: 2.45 sq mi (6.35 km^{2})
  - Land: 2.44 sq mi (6.33 km^{2})
  - Water: 0.012 sq mi (0.03 km^{2})
- Elevation: 4,757 ft (1,450 m)

Population (2020)
  - Total: 2,418
  - Density: 989.8/sq mi (382.15/km^{2})
- Time zone: UTC-8 (Pacific)
  - Summer (DST): UTC-7 (Pacific)
- ZIP code: 97630
- Area code: 541
- FIPS code: 41-40700
- GNIS feature ID: 2412870

Lakeview is a city in Lake County, Oregon, United States. The population was 2,418 at the 2020 census. It is the county seat of Lake County. The city bills itself as the "Tallest Town in Oregon" because of its elevation, 4,757 feet (1,450 m) above sea level. Lakeview is situated in the Goose Lake Valley at the foot of the Warner Mountains and at the edge of Oregon's high desert country. Its economy is based on agriculture, lumber production, and government activities. In addition, tourism is an increasingly important part of the city's economy. Oregon's Outback Scenic Byway passes through Lakeview.

== History ==
Native Americans occupied the area around Lakeview as early as 14,000 years ago, as evidenced by artifacts found in the Paisley Caves north of Lakeview. When European explorers came through the Goose Lake Valley, Shoshone-speaking people were living in the area.

In 1827, Peter Skene Ogden led a brigade of Hudson's Bay Company trappers through the Goose Lake Valley. He was followed in 1832 by John Work and his trappers. Work noted the hot springs north of Goose Lake (now called Hunter's Hot Springs) in his journal. The hot springs are approximately 2 miles (3.2 km) north of the Lakeview town site.

In 1867 and 1868, General George Crook led United States Army units and Indian scouts from the Wasco and Warm Springs tribes in a successful campaign against Northern Paiute bands in Eastern Oregon and Northern California. This was part of the conflict known as the Snake War. Crook used Camp Warner as his supply depot and administrative headquarters. The camp was abandoned in 1874. Camp Warner was northeast of the site now known as Lakeview.

In 1869, M. W. Bullard settled along Bullard Creek at the mouth of Bullard Canyon at the northern end of the Goose Lake Valley. This became the town of Lakeview. William Heryford brought cattle into the Goose Lake Valley in 1872. In 1873, the area's first post office was opened at the Tenbrook Ranch, south of present-day Lakeview.

Lake County was separated from Jackson County and Wasco County in 1874. The temporary county seat was in Linkville (now Klamath Falls, Oregon). In June 1876, an election was held to select a permanent county seat. Prior to the election, W. M. Bullard offered to donate 20 acres (8.1 ha) along Bullard Creek in the Goose Lake Valley as a site for the county courthouse. In the election, "Bullard Creek" received 120 votes while Linkville got only 88 votes. However, a majority of 384 votes was needed to determine the permanent county seat. Bullard Creek fell short because many voters wrote in names like "Goose Lake", "Goose Lake Valley", "Bullard's ranch", or "Bullard's creek". As a result, a second election was November 1876. Prior to that election, the town of Lakeview was organized at a meeting of Goose Lake Valley residents. The town site they selected was on Bullard Creek. In the second election, the new town site of Lakeview replaced Linkville as Lake County's seat of government. After the election, Bullard donated 20 acres (8.1 ha) for the county courthouse as promised. Bullard sold an additional 300 acres (120 ha) to John A. Moon, who filed a town plat with the state of Oregon, officially creating the town of Lakeview. The Lakeview post office was opened on December 8, 1876.

On May 22, 1900, a fire burned most of Lakeview. There were no deaths, but 64 buildings were destroyed. Only two business structures in the downtown area survived the fire. However, the staff of the Lake County Examiner newspaper rescued enough equipment and material to publish a special edition the day after the fire. Most of the town was rebuilt by October of that year. The town's rapid recovery was due in large part to the financing and leadership provided by Bernard Daly.

The federal government established the Goose Lake Forest Reserve in 1906. Later that year, the name was changed to Fremont National Forest Reserve to honor Captain John C. Fremont, an explorer of the area in 1843. In 1908, the Fremont National Forest was created, and is managed by the United States Forest Service. The forest headquarters was in Lakeview.

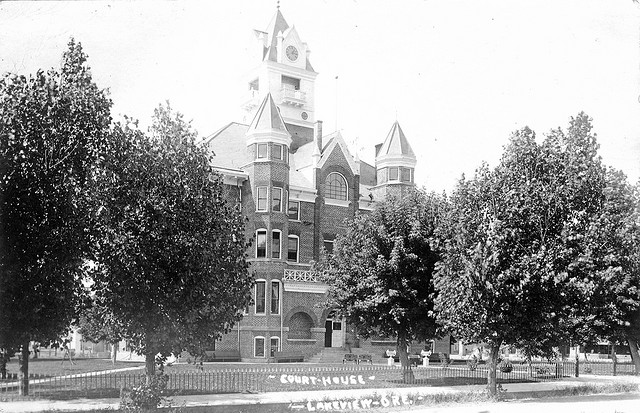
Second county courthouse, built in 1909

In 1909, the Oregon Valley Land Company conducted a week-long auction to dispose of land grants acquired from the construction of the Oregon Central Military Wagon Road in 1865 and 1869. The auction was advertised nationwide. The rural parcels also included a separate town lot in Lakeview. Thousands of people came to Lakeview for the auction, but others purchased plots sight-unseen. During the auction, a total of 340,000 acres (140,000 ha) were sold in approximately 14,000 parcels. Few buyers moved onto the land they purchased. Lake County used part of the taxes they collected from the sale to finance a new county courthouse. The new brick courthouse was built in the center of town, replacing the wooden building serving as the county court since 1876.

In 1911, a narrow-gauge railway connected Lakeview with Reno, Nevada. The Nevada-California-Oregon Railway operated the line until 1927, then it was sold to the Southern Pacific Railroad. Southern Pacific converted the track to standard gauge. The new standard rail connection prompted several sawmills to operate in Lakeview, expanding the town's economic base.

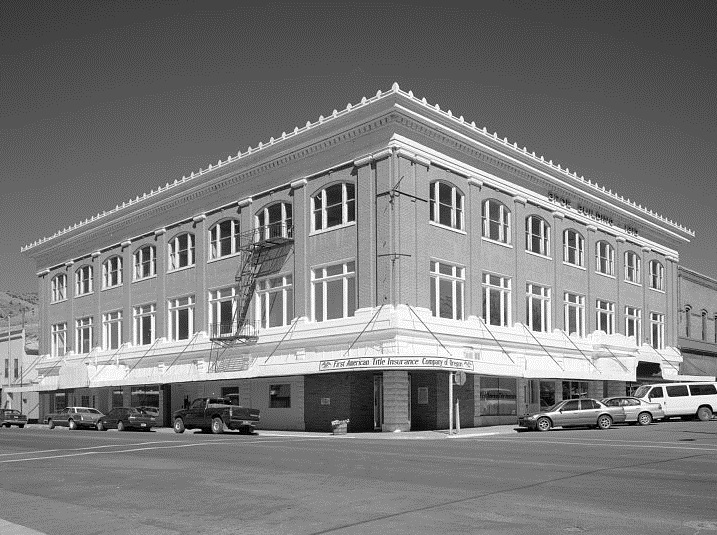
Heryford Brothers Building, built in 1913

In 1913, William P. Heryford commissioned the construction of a three-story commercial building in downtown Lakeview, across the street from the Lake County courthouse. The Heryford Brothers Building cost approximately $100,000 to construct. After it was completed, the building was the largest and most expensive structure in Lakeview. It was also the most modern, with an electric generator, central steam-heat, elevators, electric lights, hot water, and telephones.

By 1940, Lakeview had seven sawmills operating in town. All of the mills had new dry kilns for year-around operations. This increased winter employment opportunities in Lakeview, increasing economic stability in the community. The number of sawmills decreased during World War II, leaving only three by 1946. That year, 39,000,000 board feet of timber was cut on the Fremont National Forest. However, that national forest's timber harvest increased to 81,200,000 board feet per year by 1952. To accommodate this increase, Lakeview's sawmills were expanded and modernized. In the 1950s, the payrolls and income from Lakeview's sawmills accounted for more than half of the town's economy.

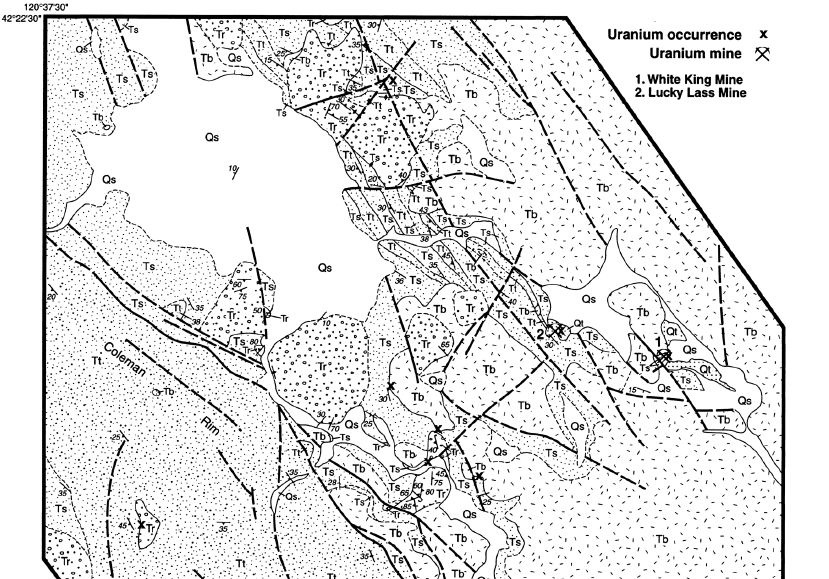
Geological map of the Lakeview District, where Tb are Miocene basalt flows, and Qt are mine tailings. Uraninite and coffinite ore bodies occur in brecciated flow-banded rhyolite associated with an intrusive dome.

In the mid-1950s, uranium mining claims were filed in the mountains north of Lakeview. However, only two mines, White King and Lucky Lass, were developed. In 1958, the Lakeview Mining Company uranium processing plant was built on the outskirts of Lakeview. The mill had the capacity to process 210 tons of uranium ore daily. The mill employed 50 people; another 120 people were employed at the two mines. The uranium plant closed in 1961.

In 1985, Southern Pacific announced they planned to abandon their spur line to Lakeview. However, the company continued to operate the line until it was purchased by Lake County in January 1986. Lake County contracted operation of the line to Great Western Railway. In 1996, Lake County took over the railroad operation, then renamed it the Lake County Railroad. From 2007, the Modoc Northern Railroad leased the line from the county. In 2009, Frontier Rail operated the line under the name Lake Railroad.

== Geography ==
Lakeview is in the Goose Lake Valley at the foot of the Warner Mountains to the east. It is on the edge of the high desert country of southeastern Oregon. At an elevation of 4,800 feet (1,500 m), Lakeview is one of the highest cities in Oregon.

According to the United States Census Bureau, the city has a total area of 2.34 square miles (6.06 km^{2}), of which 2.33 square miles (6.03 km^{2}) is land and 0.01 square miles (0.03 km^{2}) is water.

=== Climate ===
Lakeview has a typical semiarid continental Mediterranean climate (Köppen Dsb) for the leeward side of the Cascades. Summers are hotter than western Oregon during the daytime, but nights are always cool and rare frosts can occur during July. Little rainfall occurs during the summers; winters are cold and frequently severe because of the latitude and elevation, although snowfall can sometimes be heavy – the maximum monthly snow cover being 31 inches (0.79 m) during January 1993 and 44 inches (1.12 m) on the thirteenth day of that month. Typically, temperatures fall below freezing (32 °F or 0 °C) half the year, and fall below 0 °F (−17.8 °C) on only five days a year. Extreme historical temperatures range from −27 °F (−32.8 °C) on December 8, 2013 to 108 °F (42.2 °C) on August 7, 1905.

Annual precipitation averaged 15.49 inches (393.4 mm) between 1971 and 2000. The wettest calendar year since record-keeping started in 1888 is 1998 with 24.13 inches (612.9 mm); the driest was 1924 with 7.03 inches (178.6 mm) – less than the total for the wettest month of December 1964 of 8.96 inches (227.6 mm) fall, including the melt from 20.50 inches (0.52 m) of snow. The most snowfall in a calendar month was 53.0 inches (1.35 m) in February 1894, and the most in a season at least 134.5 inches (3.42 m) (some days unavailable) between July 1893 and June 1894, in contrast to which as little as 15.40 inches (0.39 m) fell in the drought season between July 1923 and June 1924.

Climate data for Lakeview 2 NNW, Oregon (1971–2000; extremes since 1888)
Month	Jan	Feb	Mar	Apr	May	Jun	Jul	Aug	Sep	Oct	Nov	Dec	Year
Record high °F (°C)	66 (19)	69 (21)	79 (26)	87 (31)	96 (36)	101 (38)	106 (41)	108 (42)	99 (37)	89 (32)	79 (26)	67 (19)	108 (42)
Mean daily maximum °F (°C)	37.8 (3.2)	42.0 (5.6)	47.9 (8.8)	55.8 (13.2)	64.6 (18.1)	74.0 (23.3)	83.8 (28.8)	83.1 (28.4)	75.1 (23.9)	62.7 (17.1)	46.0 (7.8)	38.6 (3.7)	59.3 (15.2)
Mean daily minimum °F (°C)	20.6 (−6.3)	24.0 (−4.4)	27.8 (−2.3)	31.6 (−0.2)	37.6 (3.1)	44.1 (6.7)	50.3 (10.2)	48.4 (9.1)	41.8 (5.4)	33.1 (0.6)	26.0 (−3.3)	20.6 (−6.3)	33.8 (1.0)
Record low °F (°C)	−24 (−31)	−22 (−30)	−4 (−20)	2 (−17)	17 (−8)	20 (−7)	30 (−1)	26 (−3)	12 (−11)	0 (−18)	−7 (−22)	−27 (−33)	−27 (−33)
Average precipitation inches (mm)	1.90 (48)	1.69 (43)	1.70 (43)	1.30 (33)	1.46 (37)	0.99 (25)	0.48 (12)	0.42 (11)	0.77 (20)	1.02 (26)	1.86 (47)	1.90 (48)	15.49 (393)
Average snowfall inches (cm)	10.2 (26)	10.8 (27)	6.4 (16)	4.0 (10)	1.8 (4.6)	0.1 (0.25)	0.0 (0.0)	0.0 (0.0)	0.2 (0.51)	1.4 (3.6)	7.0 (18)	10.1 (26)	52 (131.96)
Average precipitation days (≥ 0.01 inch)	11.6	10.7	11.7	9.5	8.3	5.8	3.1	2.6	4.0	6.0	10.4	11.1	94.8
Average snowy days (≥ 0.1 inch)	5.1	4.9	3.1	2.0	0.9	0.1	0.0	0.0	0.1	0.6	3.3	5.1	25.2
Source: National Oceanic and Atmospheric Administration

== Demographics ==
Historical population
Census	Pop.	Note	%±
1880	270		—
1890	770		185.2%
1900	761		−1.2%
1910	1,253		64.7%
1920	1,139		−9.1%
1930	1,799		57.9%
1940	2,466		37.1%
1950	2,831		14.8%
1960	3,260		15.2%
1970	2,705		−17.0%
1980	2,770		2.4%
1990	2,526		−8.8%
2000	2,474		−2.1%
2010	2,294		−7.3%
2020	2,418		5.4%

=== 2010 census ===
As of the census of 2010, there were 2,294 people, 1,034 households, and 632 families residing in the city. The population density was 984.5 inhabitants per square mile (380.1/km^{2}). There were 1,212 housing units at an average density of 520.2 per square mile (200.9/km^{2}). The racial makeup of the city was 91.3% White, 1.6% Native American, 0.8% Asian, 0.1% Pacific Islander, 2.9% from other races, and 3.4% from two or more races. Hispanic or Latino of any race were 7.8% of the population.

There were 1,034 households, of which 27.5% had children under the age of 18 living with them, 47.7% were married couples living together, 9.4% had a female householder with no husband present, 4.1% had a male householder with no wife present, and 38.9% were non-families. 35.4% of all households were made up of individuals, and 15.6% had someone living alone who was 65 years of age or older. The average household size was 2.18 and the average family size was 2.78.

The median age in the city was 43.9 years. 21.8% of residents were under the age of 18; 6.6% were between the ages of 18 and 24; 23% were from 25 to 44; 28.3% were from 45 to 64; and 20.2% were 65 years of age or older. The gender makeup of the city was 49.3% male and 50.7% female.

=== 2000 census ===
As of the census of 2000, there were 2,474 people, 1,037 households, and 695 families residing in the city. The population density was 1,582.7 inhabitants per square mile (611.1/km^{2}). There were 1,220 housing units at an average density of 780.5 per square mile (301.4/km^{2}). The racial makeup of the city was 91.47% White, 0.04% African American, 2.47% Native American, 0.93% Asian, 0.16% Pacific Islander, 3.07% other races, and 1.86% from two or more races. Hispanic or Latino of any race were 5.86% of the population.

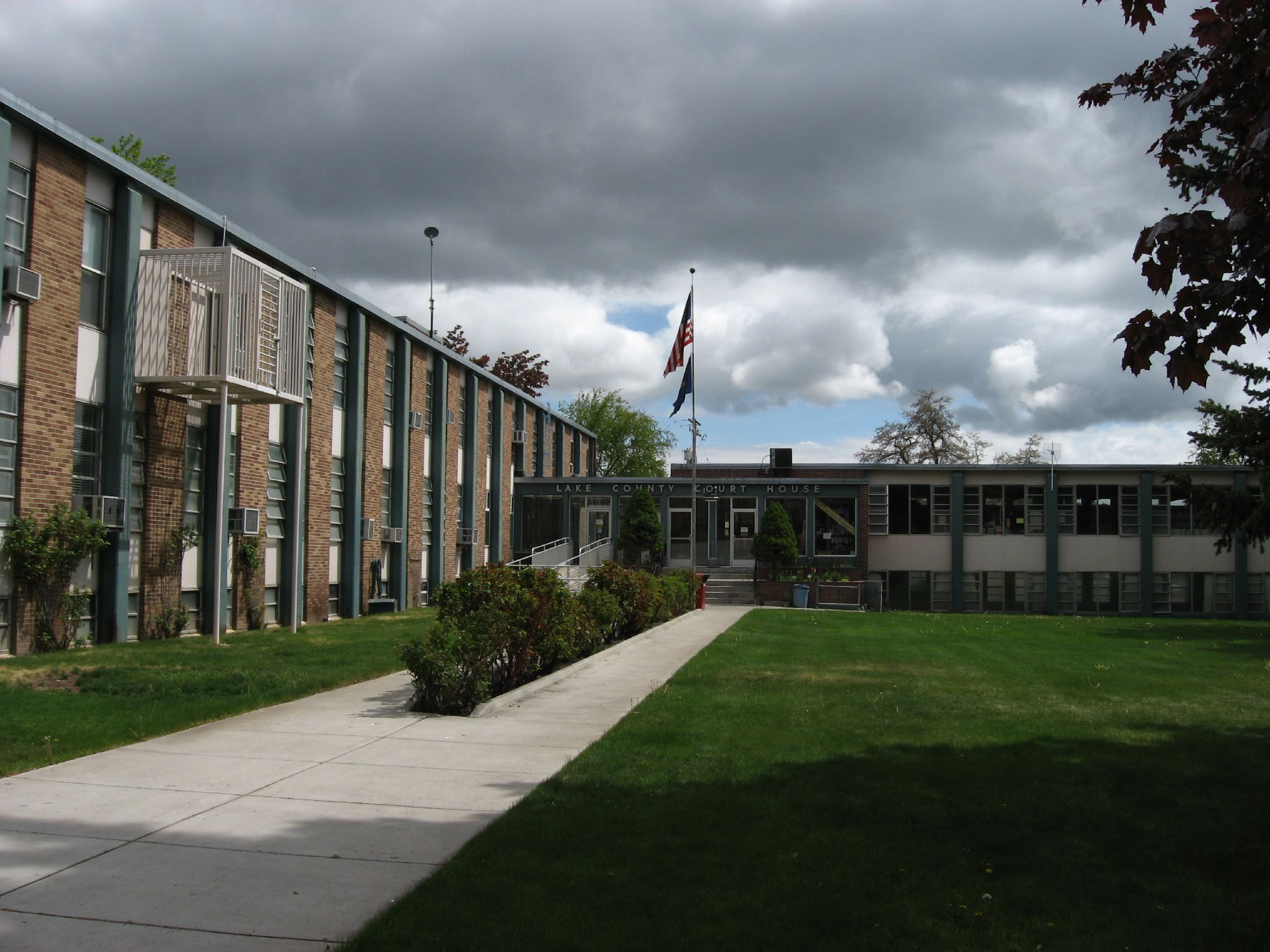
Lake County courthouse in Lakeview, 2008

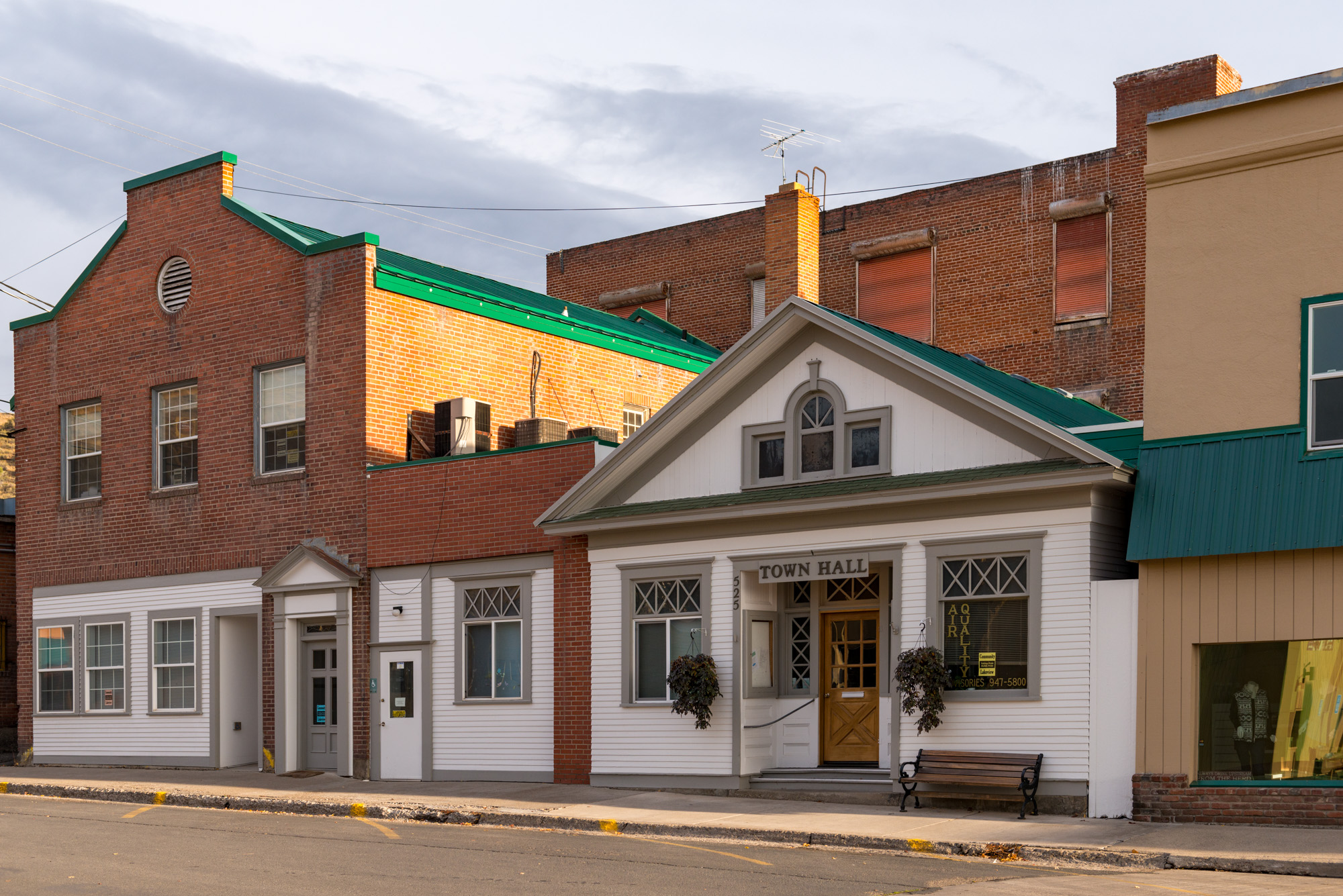
Lakeview Town Hall

There were 1,037 households, out of which 29.1% had children under the age of 18 living with them, 53.3% were married couples living together, 9.7% had a female householder with no husband present, and 32.9% were non-families. 30.2% of all households were made up of individuals, and 13.5% had someone living alone who was 65 years of age or older. The average household size was 2.34 and the average family size was 2.85.

In the city, the population was spread out, with 25.4% under the age of 18, 5.0% from 18 to 24, 24.1% from 25 to 44, 25.9% from 45 to 64, and 19.6% who were 65 years of age or older. The median age was 43 years. For every 100 females, there were 94.2 males. For every 100 females age 18 and over, there were 89.8 males.

The median income for a household in the city was $30,960, and the median income for a family was $38,953. Males had a median income of $31,958 versus $22,198 for females. The per capita income for the city was $15,649. About 14.3% of families and 15.3% of the population were below the poverty line, including 20.1% of those under age 18 and 13.3% of those age 65 or over.

== Economy ==
Lakeview's economy is based on agriculture, lumber, and government. Cattle ranching and hay production are important elements of the local economy. The Fremont–Winema National Forest provides timber for lumber and wood products. The Collins Companies operates a sawmill in Lakeview. Because agricultural and lumber-related employment varies with the seasons, government agents of the national forest, of the Bureau of Land Management, and other agents significantly influence the community's economic base. Tourism is a growing part of the economy because of the many recreational opportunities in the area.

Lakeview is the county seat of Lake County. A significant number of people in Lakeview are federal and state government agents. In addition to government employment, Lakeview has several schools, a hospital, a sawmill, a perlite mine, and a wide range of agriculture enterprises. According to the 2012 American Community Survey conducted by the United States Census Bureau, the largest areas of employment in Lakeview are health care (18%), government agents (17%), agriculture and forestry (10%), manufacturing (9%), retail (9%), technical professions (7%), and transportation (6%).

The Fremont National Forest was 'administratively' combined with Winema National Forest in 2002. Lakeview was selected as the location for the combined Fremont–Winema National Forest headquarters of the government agents. Lakeview is also the home of the Lakeview Ranger District, an 'administrative' sub-division of the Fremont–Winema National Forest. The Bureau of Land Management's Lakeview District is in the national forest headquarters. The Lakeview Interagency Fire Center is in Lakeview. The center coordinated wildfire suppression activities between the local agents including the United States Forest Service, Bureau of Land Management, United States Fish and Wildlife Service, National Park Service, and the Oregon Department of Forestry.

The nearby Warner Creek Correctional Facility opened in 2005. The penitentiary was opposed by Lake County voters. The minimum-security penitentiary, 4 miles (6 km) northwest of the city, employs a staff of 100 and holds about 400 convicts.

Tourism is an important part of Lakeview's economy. Lakeview claims the title of "Tallest Town in Oregon" because of the 4,800-foot (1,500 m) elevation. It is part of the "Oregon Outback", attracting tourist, sportsmen, and outdoors enthusiasts. Local attractions include fishing, birdwatching, camping, hang gliding, paragliding, hiking, rockhounding, hunting, and nature viewing.

Since 1999, Lake County and the City of Lakeview offer tax incentives to invite renewable energy companies. Several private development projects resulted. Iberdrola Renewables planned to build a 26.8-megawatt biomass facility to convert sawmill waste and forest slash into electricity.

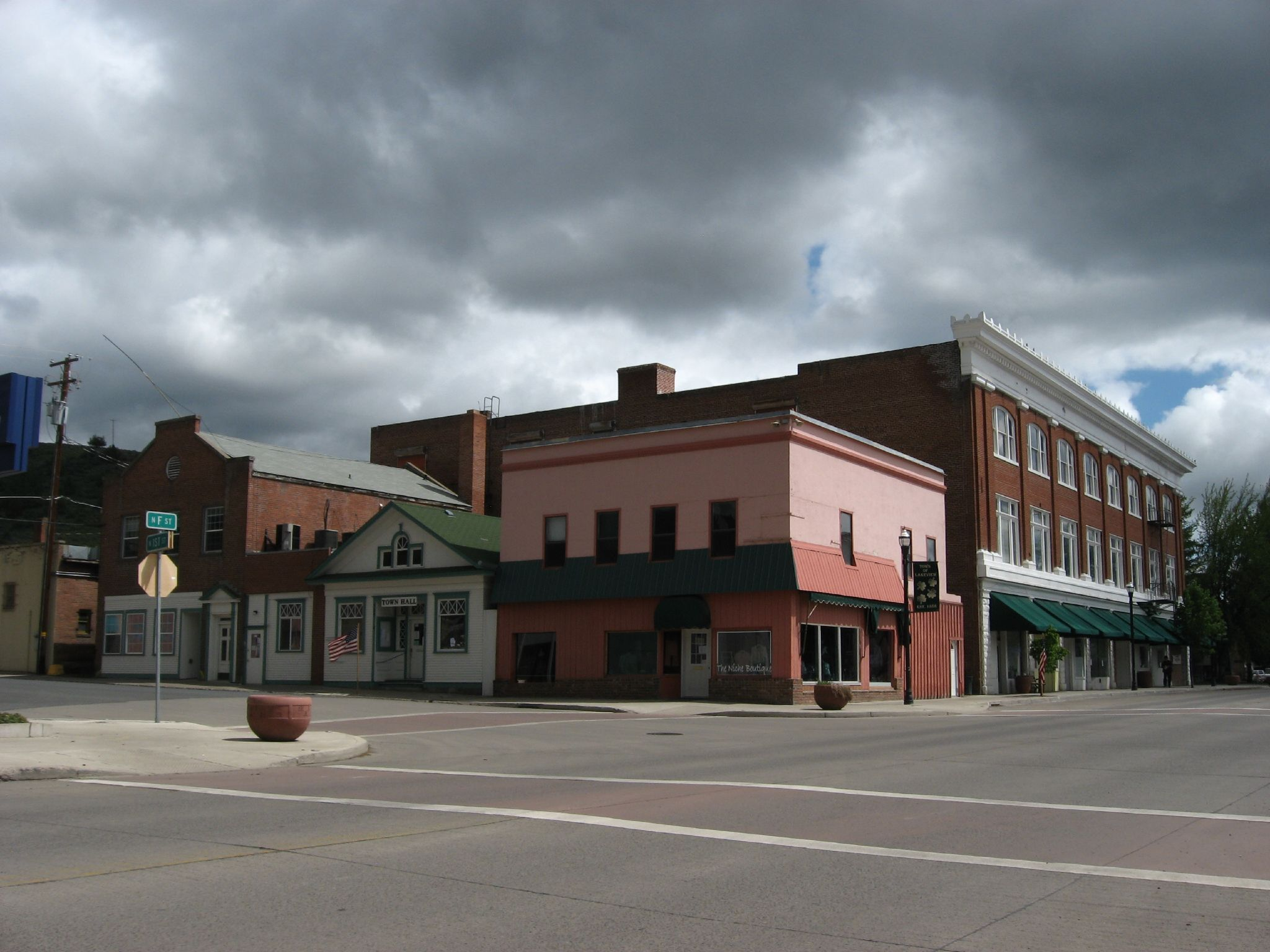
Downtown Lakeview

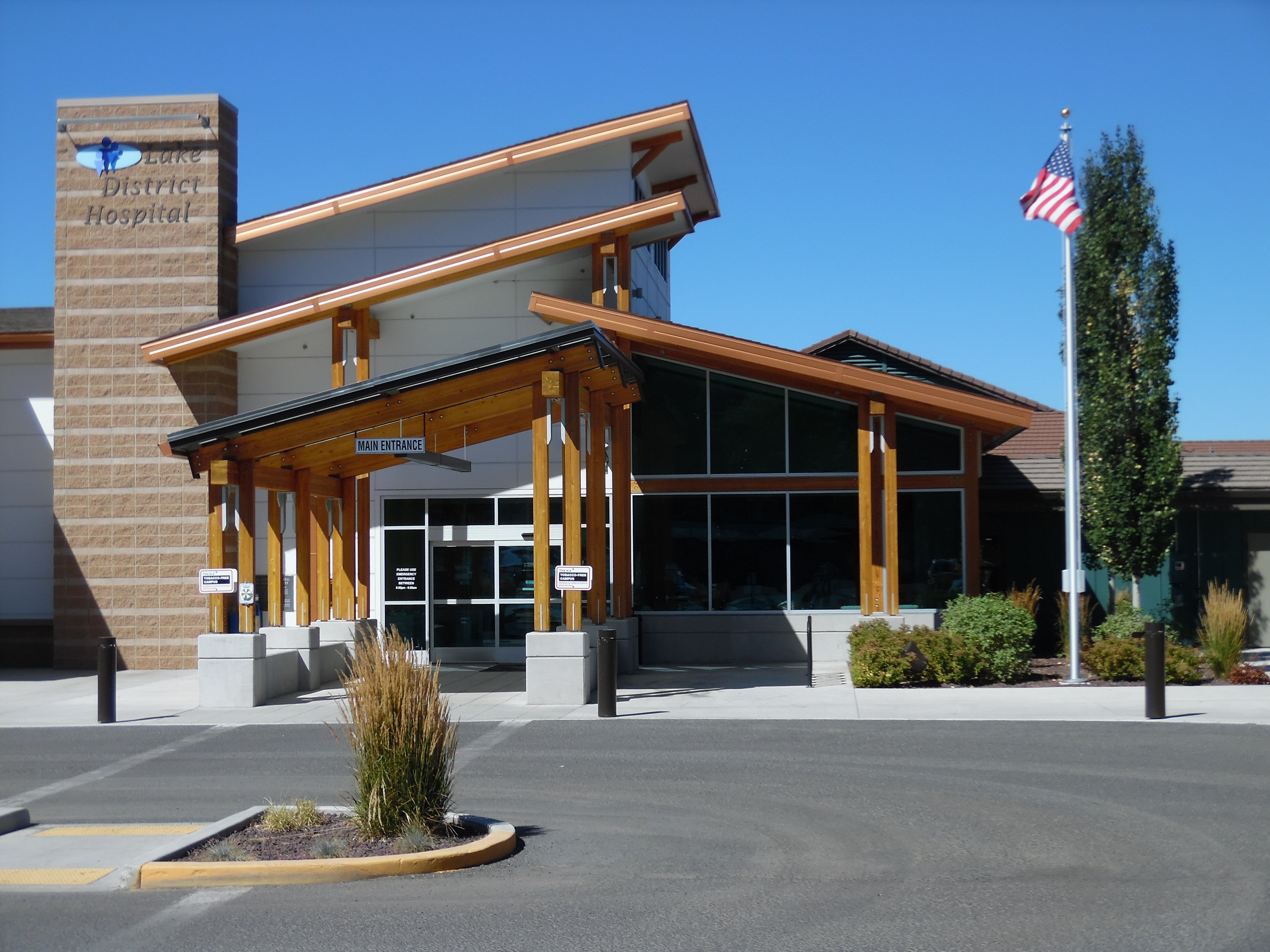
District hospital

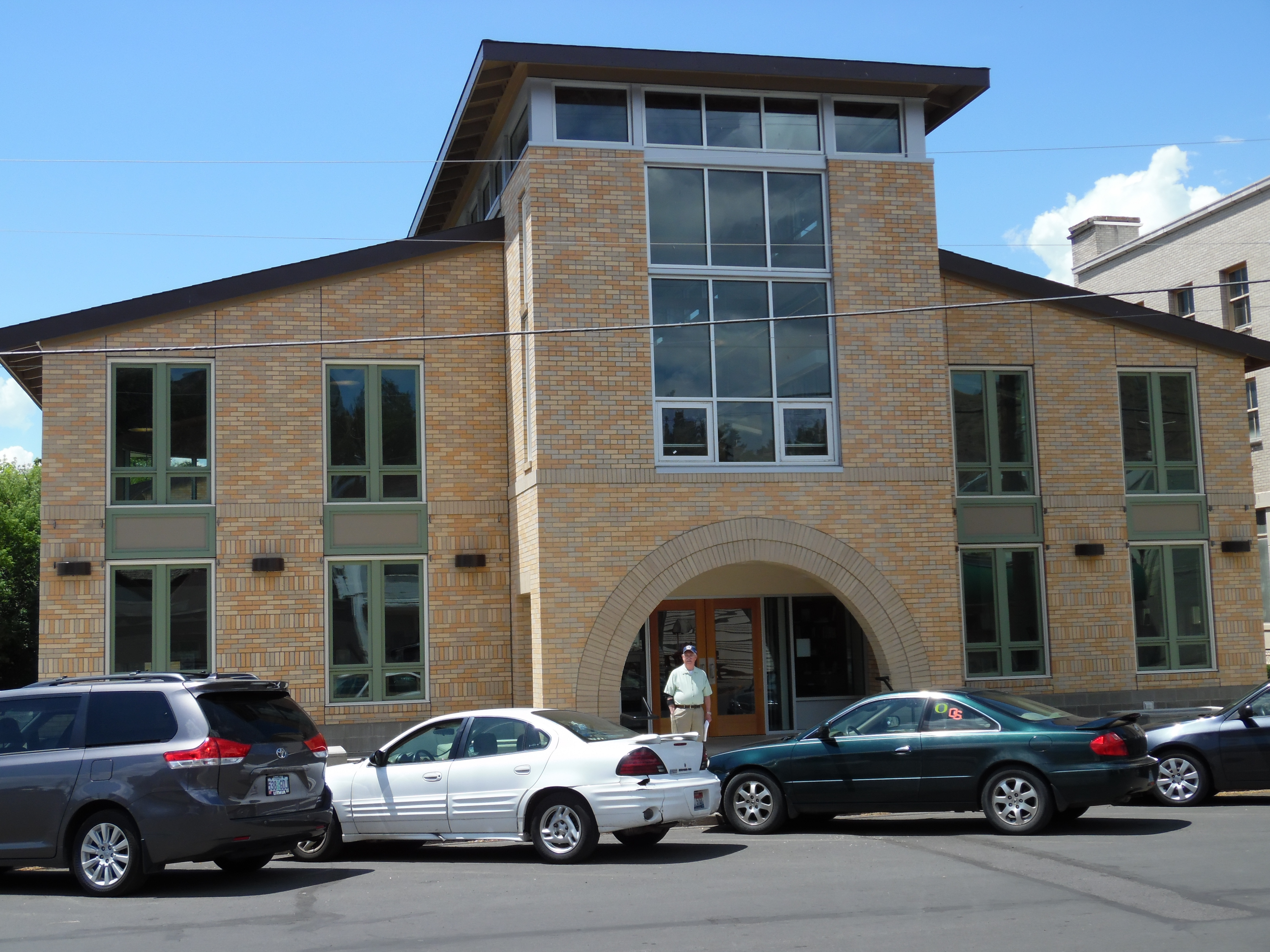
County library

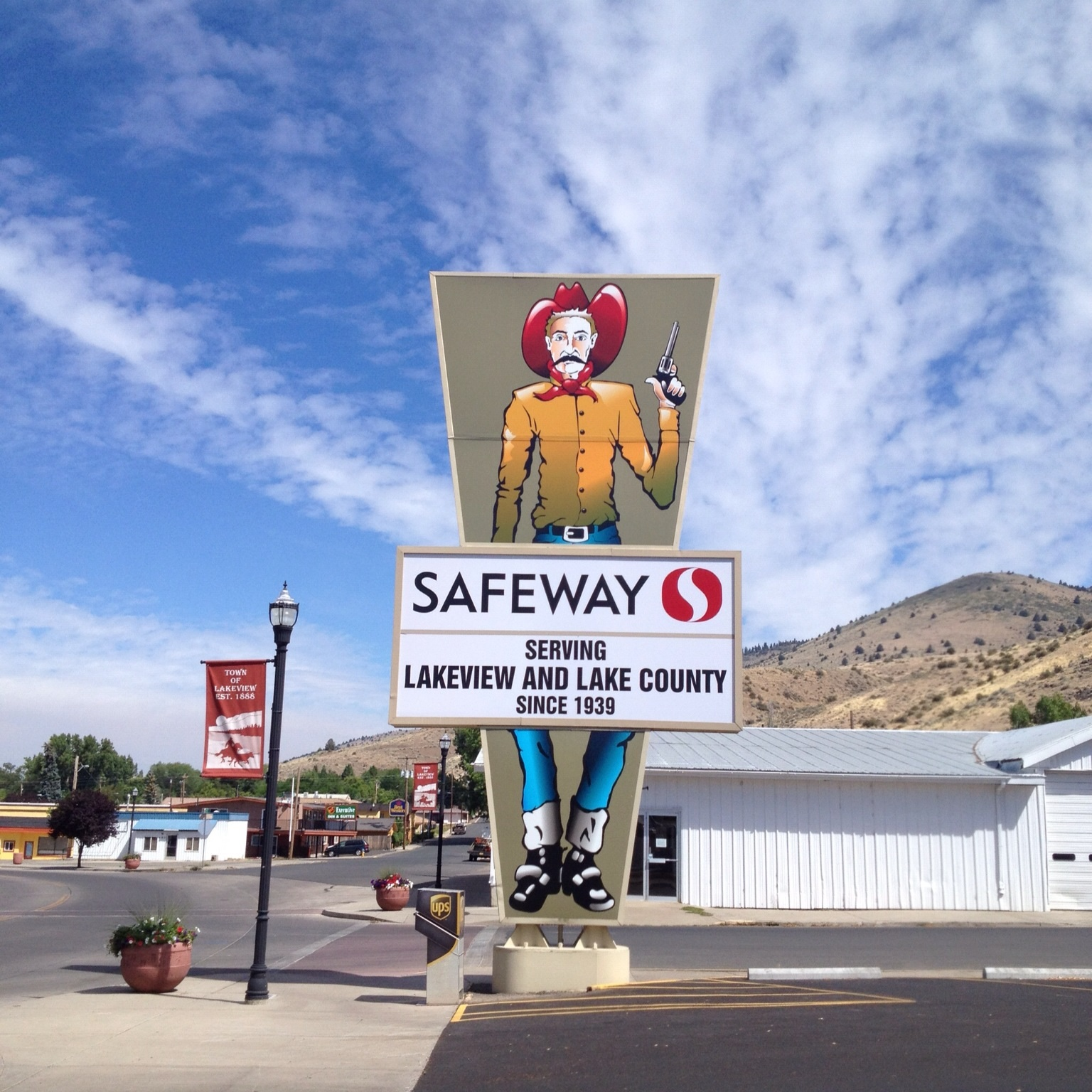
Safeway store

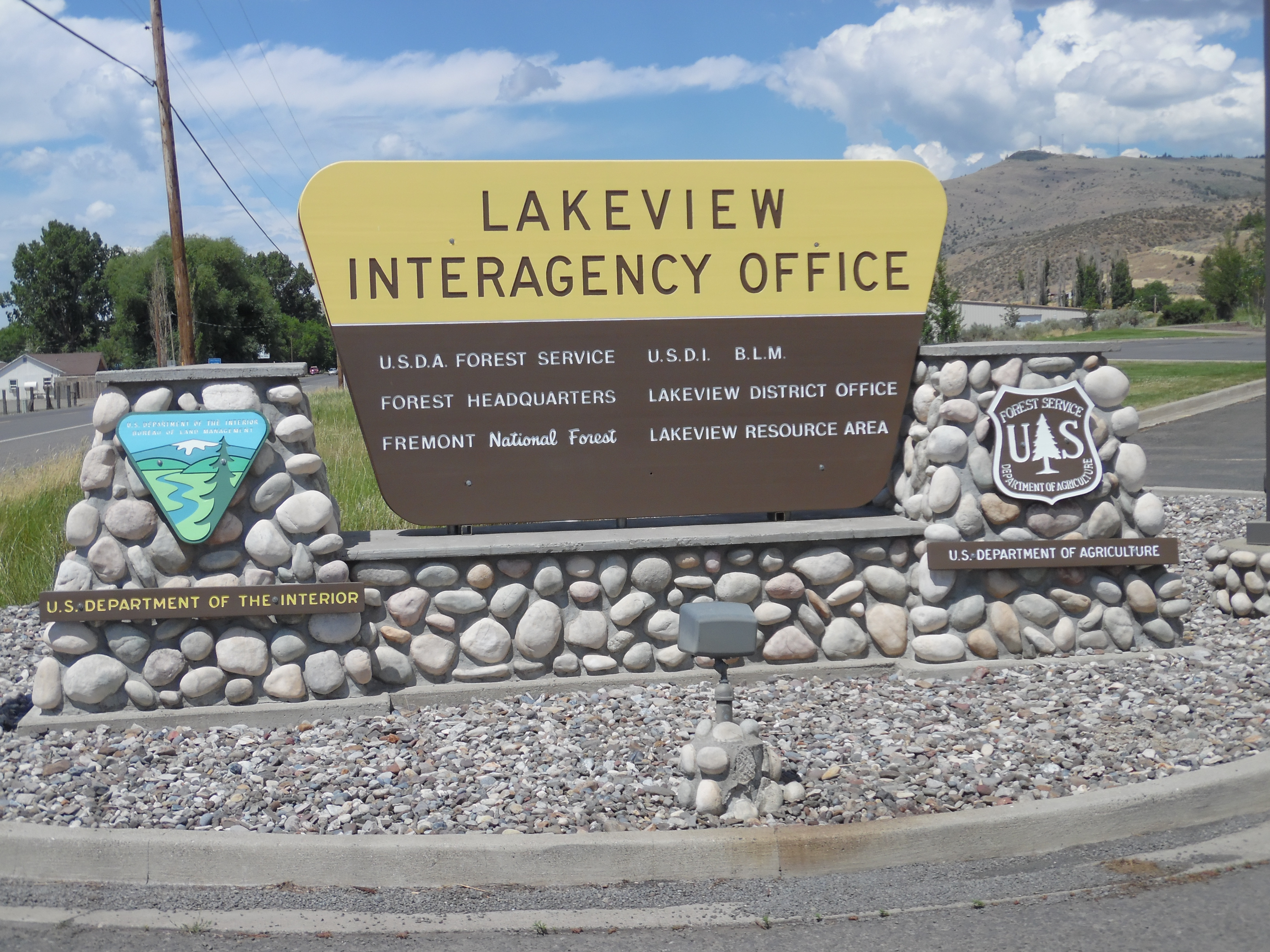
Federal office complex

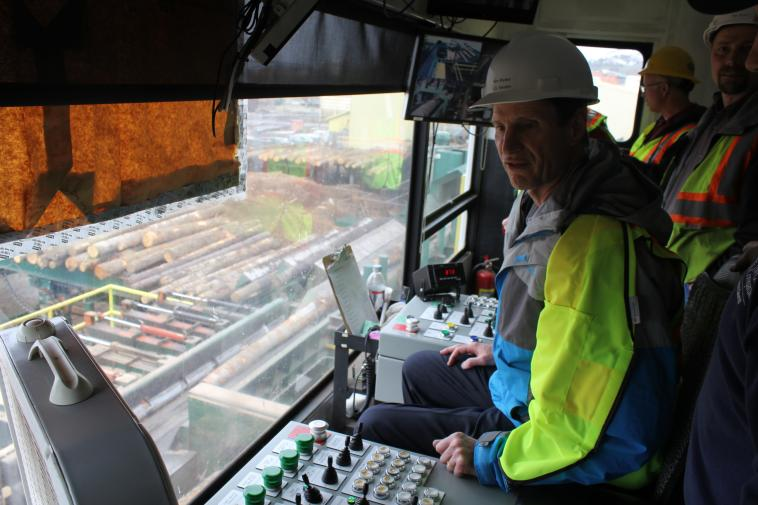
Sawmill operation

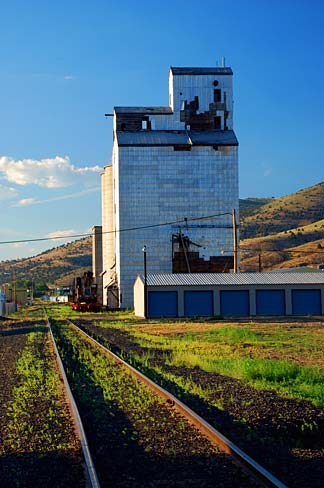
Grain elevator (now demolished)

== Recreation and other points of interest ==
In the summer, the Fremont–Winema National Forest's Lakeview District provides outdoor recreation opportunities. The Lakeview District has 22 trails open to mountain bike riders. All those trails and more are available for hiking. The national forest has lakes and streams available for sport fishing. There are also camping and picnic sites near Lakeview.

In the winter, alpine skiers can enjoy their sport at Warner Canyon Ski Area. The ski hill is in the Fremont–Winema National Forest 10 miles (16 km) northeast of Lakeview on Oregon Route 140. Snowmobiles are also popular during winter.

Lakeview is known as one of the best places in North America for hang-gliding and paragliding, and was designated "the Hang Gliding Capital of the West" in 1991. The national championships for hang-gliding were held in Lakeview in 1993, 1997, 2000, and 2008, while the national championships for paragliding were held in Lakeview in 1998 and 2007. For at least two decades, Lakeview hosted the "Umpteenth Annual Festival of Free Flight" over the Fourth of July holiday weekend, sponsored by the Lake County Chamber of Commerce, and various local businesses. This event draws pilots and families globally for hang-gliding and paragliding.

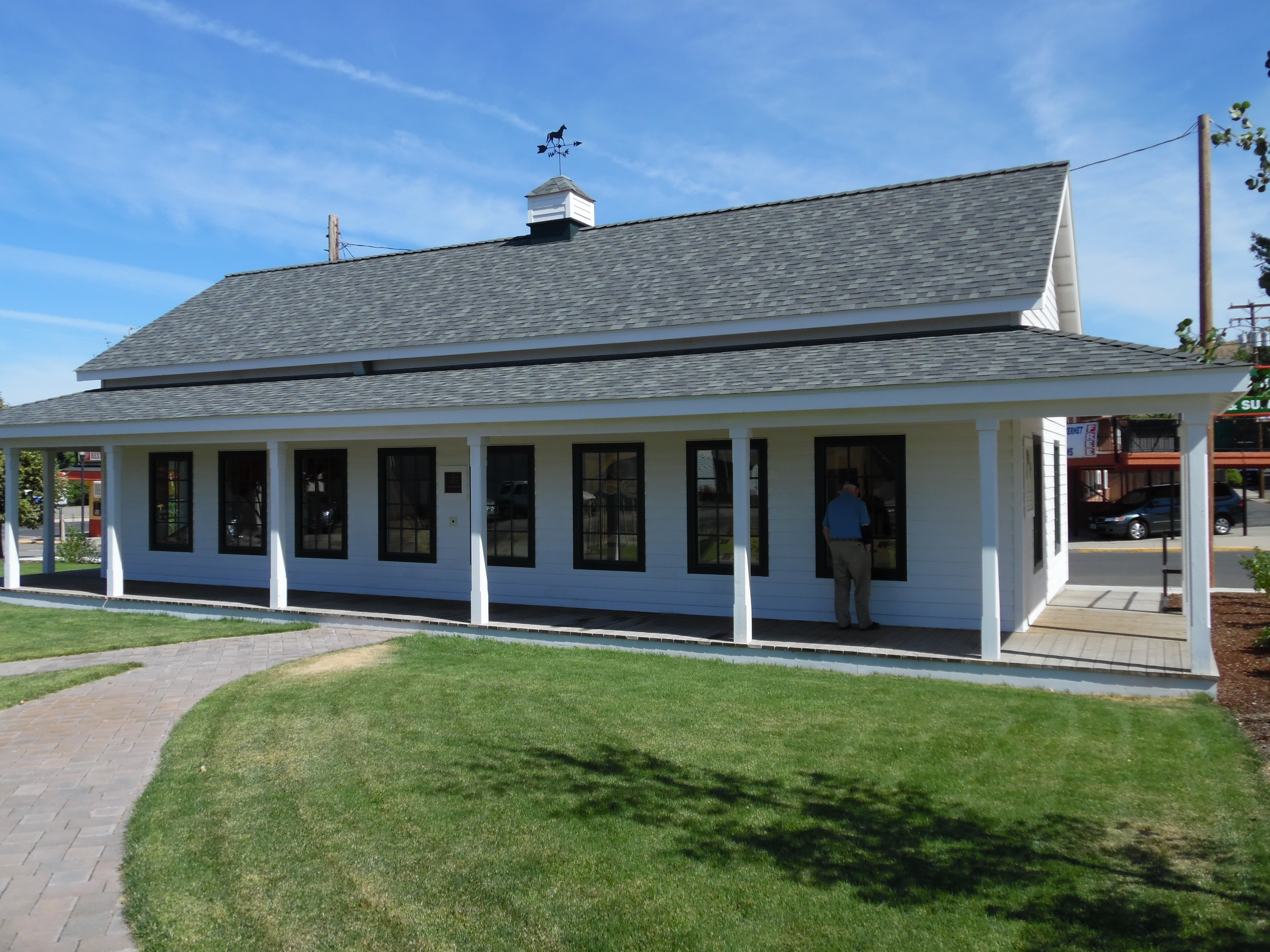
MC Chuck Wagon Western Heritage Exhibit

Lakeview is also known for the hot water geyser, Old Perpetual, located at Hunter's Hot Springs. The geyser sometimes goes "silent" from about the first of September until around mid-October. Some people attributed this to farm irrigation during the spring and summer; others believe it may be caused by geothermal development the City of Lakeview supplies the Warner Creek Correctional Facility with water for heating. However, the city and the Oregon Department of Corrections deny any cause-and-effect relationship between geothermal development and the geyser's periodic dormancy. The government agents claim there is no evidence to identify the cause(s) of the geyser's dormancy.

Other points of interest include:

- Lake County Museum
- Schminck Memorial Museum
- MC Chuck Wagon Western Heritage Exhibit
- Nevada–California–Oregon Railway Passenger Station (National Register of Historic Places)
- Heryford Brothers Building (National Register of Historic Places)
- Post and King Saloon (National Register of Historic Places)
- Bailey and Massingill General Store (National Register of Historic Places)
- Lake County Round Sale Barn (National Register of Historic Places)
- Black Cap vista-point and hang-glider launch-site
- Gearhart Mountain Wilderness
- Abert Rim
- Outback Scenic Byway

== Education ==
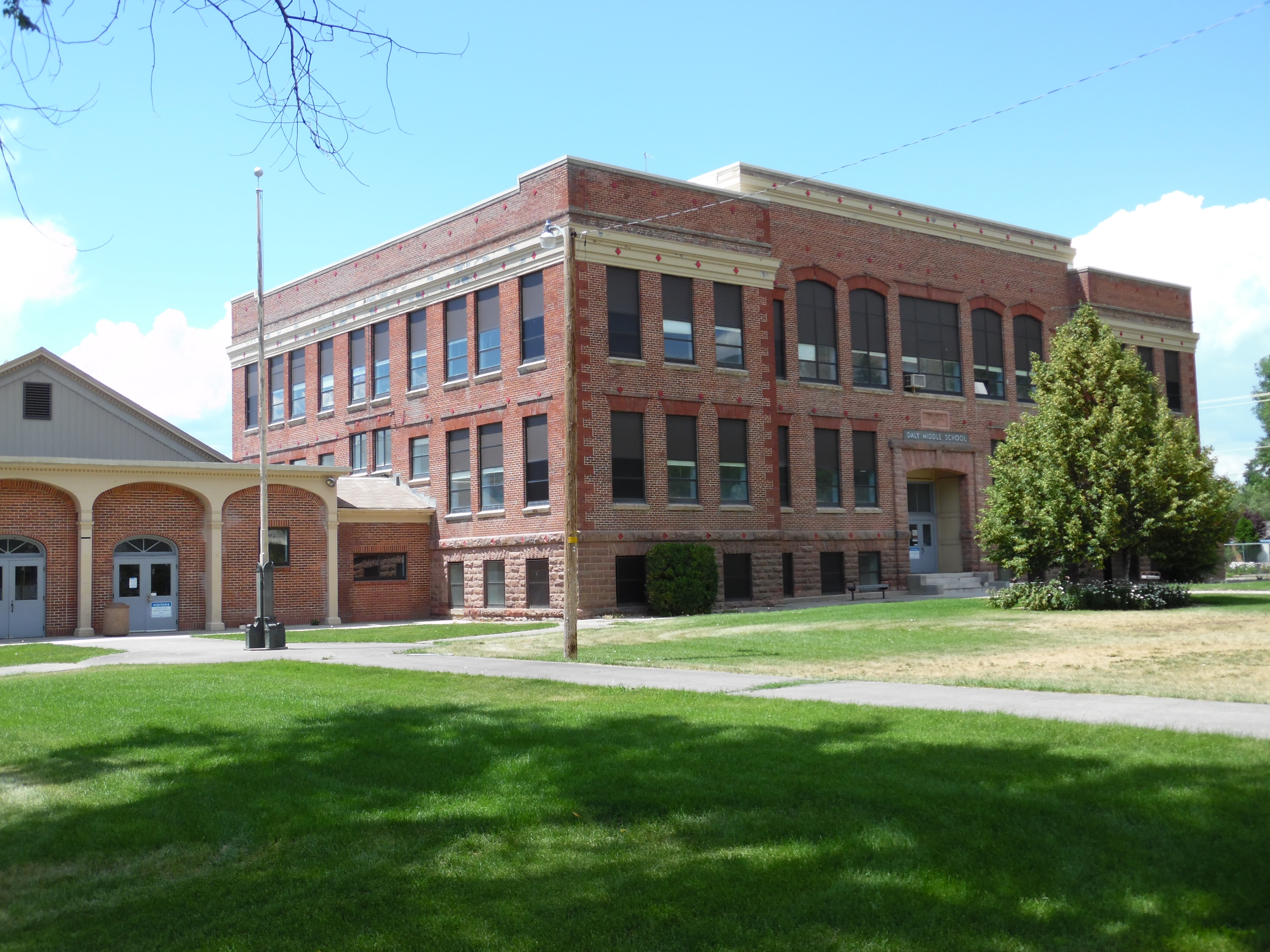
Daly Middle School in Lakeview

Lakeview High School, the only high school in the city, is part of Lakeview School District #7; serving students in grades 9 through 12. Daly Middle School, was re-located to Lakeview High School in 2012, and serves students in grades 7–8. Lakeview has two elementary schools across the street from each other, Fremont Elementary School houses K-3 while A.D. Hay Elementary School, considered the main building, houses grades 4–6. Since 2013, the former Daly Middle School building is the Klamath Community College's Innovative and Learning Center. The new Center brings KCC classes and degree programs to Lakeview, removing the obstacle of driving 100 miles (160 km) each way to attend classes.

Many students from high schools in Lake County attended college on scholarships provided in trust by pioneer physician Bernard Daly. Known as the Bernard Daly Educational Fund, the funds help over 1,600 Lake County students. Daly was a medical doctor, rancher, banker, and politician. He was associated with an act of 'frontier heroism' two days after a fire during a Christmas program at the isolated Oregon town of Silver Lake in December 1894. Rancher Ed O'Farrell rode to Lakeview some 100 miles away in sub-zero temperatures to fetch Daly. The ride took 19 hours, with O'Farrell switching horses at ranches along his route. Daly and driver William Duncan made the return trip to Silver Lake in 13 hours using a buggy. During those two days, forty-three people perished from the fire, the worst in Oregon history.

The section of Lake County that Lakeview is in is not a part of a community college district, but the county has a "contract-out-of-district" (COD) with Klamath Community College.

== Infrastructure ==
=== Transportation ===
Lakeview is on U.S. Route 395 and Oregon Route 140. Oregon's Outback Scenic Byway passes through Lakeview along Highway 395. By road, the nearest incorporated cities are Klamath Falls, Oregon, 96 miles (154 km) west of Lakeview; Bend, Oregon, 175 miles (282 km) to the northwest; Burns, Oregon, 139 miles (224 km) to the northeast; Winnemucca, Nevada, 211 miles (340 km) to the southeast; and Alturas, California, 54 miles (87 km) south of Lakeview.

The Lake Railroad (formerly the Lake County Railroad) is a spur line from Lakeview to Alturas, California. It provides Lakeview with freight service only. It is owned by Lake County residents, and is operated by Frontier Rail. Lakeview is 96 mi (154 km) from the Amtrak station in Klamath Falls.

The Lake County Airport is 3 miles (5 km) southwest of the Lakeview's downtown area. It is a public airport owned by Lake County residents. The airport covers 1,000 acres (405 ha), and includes a single 5,318-foot (1,621 m) asphalt runway.

Local and regional public transportation is available through the Lake County Senior Citizens Association. All vehicle are equipped with lifts or ramps for ADA transport. Areas served includes Christmas Valley, Fort Rock, Silver Lake, Lakeview, Adel, Plush.

=== Water ===
The Oregon Legislature approved $15 million in 2021 for a new water treatment plant for the city.

== Notable people ==
- Mark W. Bullard, pioneer who donated land to establish town of Lakeview
- Kayte Christensen, color commentator and former professional basketball player
- Charles A. Cogswell, Lake County pioneer, attorney and politician
- Bernard Daly, pioneer doctor, businessman, and politician
- Arthur D. Hay, Oregon Supreme Court Associate Justice
- George W. Joseph, attorney and politician
- Marty Lees, college baseball coach
- Reub Long, rancher and author
- Chuck Mawhinney, Marine Corps sharpshooter
- Stephen P. Moss, rancher, businessman, and state legislator
- Jim Rooker, baseball player
- Jean Saubert, Olympic skiing medalist, Oregon Sports HOF
- Warner B. Snider, state legislator, county commissioner, sheriff, and rancher
- Burt K. Snyder, businessman and state legislator; mayor of Lakeview
- W. Lair Thompson, attorney and politician
- Liz VanLeeuwen, journalist and state representative
- Cobina Wright, actress and opera singer
