= Picture Rock Pass =

Mountain pass in Oregon, USA

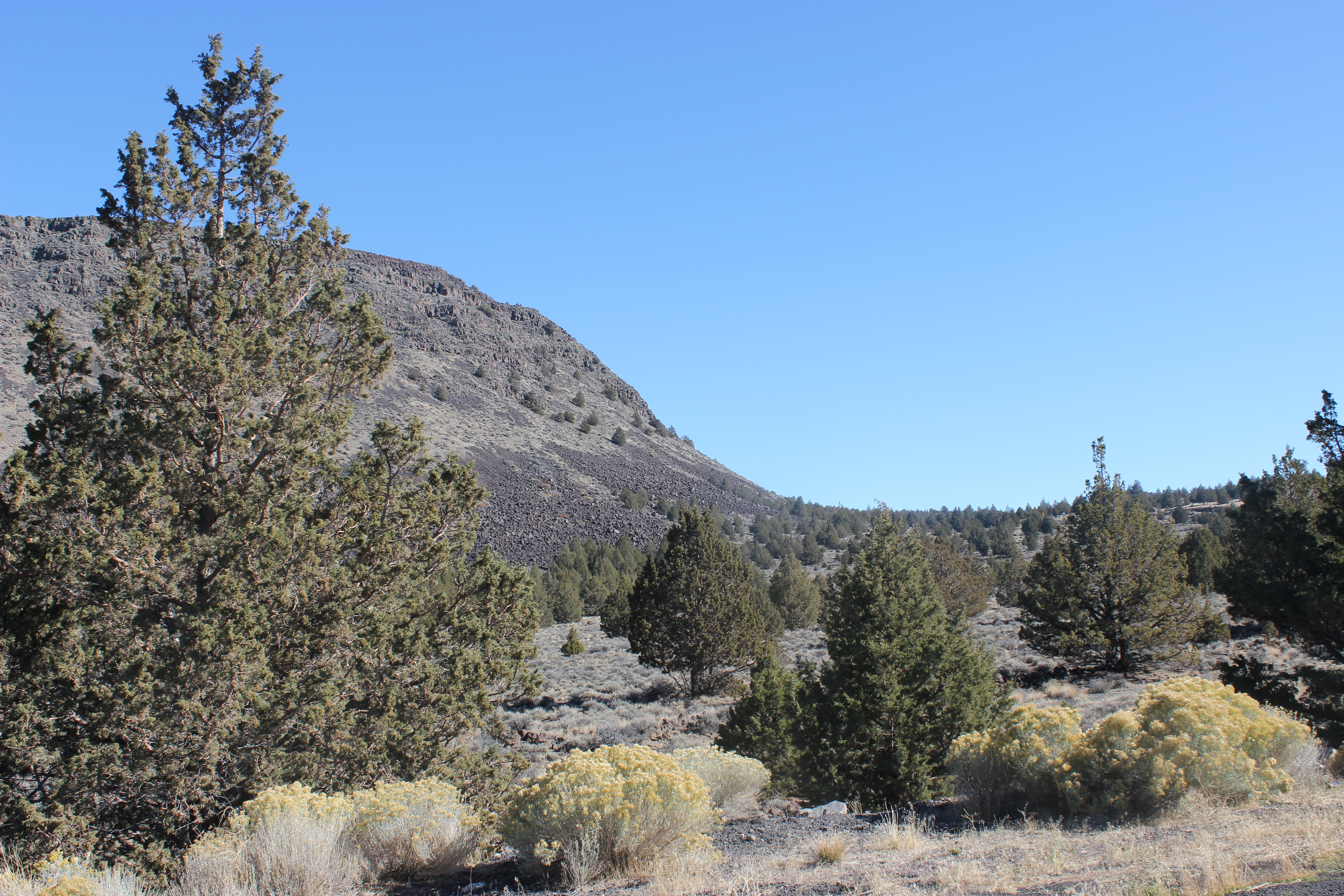
- North side of Picture Rock Pass
- Interactive map of Picture Rock Pass
- Elevation: 4,830 ft (1,470 m)
- Traversed by: OR 31

Third Approach
- Location: Lake County, Oregon, United States
- Coordinates: 43.047816°N 120.798798°W

Picture Rock Pass, elevation 4,830 feet (1,470 m), is a mountain pass in Oregon traversed by Oregon Route 31. It is located between the communities of Silver Lake and Paisley in Lake County. Geographically, it separates Silver Lake and Summer Lake. These two lakes with their related drainage basins are the most northwesterly part of the Great Basin.

The name of the pass comes from petroglyphs on rocks south of the highway at the Picture Rock Pass Petroglyphs Site.
