= Picture Rock Pass Petroglyphs Site =

- U.S. National Register of Historic Places
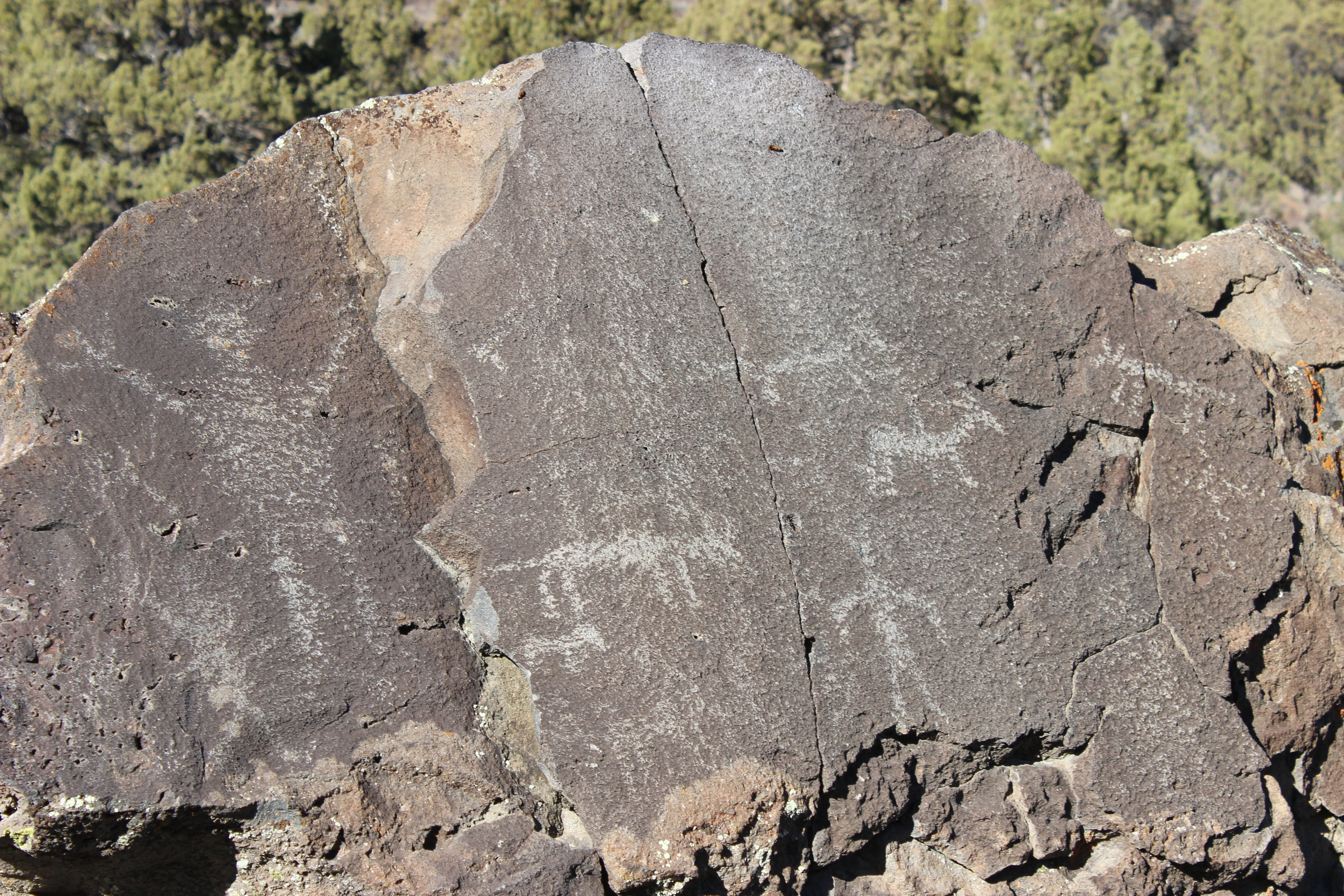
- Petroglyphs near summit of Picture Rock Pass
- Location: Lake County, Oregon, USA
- Coordinates: 43.047°N 120.798°W
- Built: Unknown
- Architectural style: Prehistoric rock art
- NRHP reference No.: 75001585
- Added to NRHP: 1975

The Picture Rock Pass Petroglyphs Site is in northern Lake County, Oregon, United States. The site is located near the summit of Picture Rock Pass on land administered by the Bureau of Land Management. The designs were scraped into a basalt boulder by ancient Native Americans, probably between 7,500 and 12,000 years ago. No one knows the meaning of the petroglyph designs. Because of its unique archaeological and cultural significance, the Picture Rock Pass Petroglyph Site was listed on the National Register of Historic Places in 1975.

== Prehistoric environment ==
Following the retreating glaciers of the last glaciation period of the Ice Age, melt water accumulated in the closed basins of what now is south central Oregon. As a result, pluvial lakes covered much of the high desert. This included the Summer Lake basin south of Picture Rock Pass and the Silver Lake basin north of the pass. The marshes and meadows that surrounded these lakes were ideal habitat for wildlife including bison, deer, antelope, mountain sheep, and many varieties of waterfowl. The abundant wildlife drew prehistoric hunters to the area.

No one knows when the first people arrived in south central Oregon. However, there is evidence that Native Americans have lived in this area for over 12,000 years. Little is known about the people who occupied the land at that time, except that they camped and hunted near the ancient lakes around Picture Rock Pass. This was confirmed by Clovis Period artifacts found at Fort Rock Cave and Paisley Caves. These archeological sites are both close to the pass. Fort Rock Cave is located 29 miles (47 km) north of the pass while the Paisley Caves are 20 miles (32 km) south of the pass, overlooking Summer Lake. In addition to leaving artifacts in caves, the area's early inhabitants created rock carvings at sites throughout south central Oregon including Picture Rock Pass.

== Petroglyphs ==
The Picture Rock Pass petroglyphs are carved on a south-facing basalt boulder near the summit of the pass. No one knows when the Picture Rock Pass petroglyphs were created or who carved them. However, they were probably created during either Clovis Period (10,000 and 12,000 years ago) or the Stemmed Point Period that followed (7,500 to 10,000 years ago), placing the likely period of the rock carvings sometime between 7,500 and 12,000 years ago.

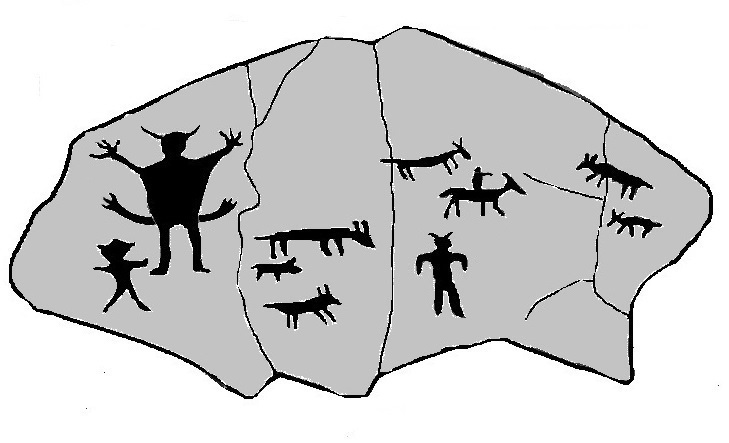
Diagram of petroglyph figures on rock face

When the first white men passed through southeastern Oregon in the 1840s, the Yahuskin Band of the Northern Paiute tribe lived in the area of south central Oregon around Picture Rock Pass. Because Native Americans in this area were nomadic, Tenino people from the Warm Springs area of Central Oregon and Klamath people from southern Oregon may also have used areas around Picture Rock Pass. However, it is possible that none of these peoples were responsible for creating the Picture Rock Pass petroglyphs given the age of the carvings.

The meaning of the Picture Rock Pass petroglyphs is unknown. The most common explanations are that they were used in hunting ceremonies or marked the migration routes of native peoples. Alternatively, the petroglyphs may have been created to identify tribal territory, record myths, or commemorate important tribal events. Perhaps the simplest explanation is that the petroglyphs were just fanciful designs cut into the rock by a prehistoric artist. While all these theories are possible explanations for their creation, no one knows for sure what motivated the petroglyph maker.

There are ten figures in the Picture Rock Pass petroglyph group. Three are human-like figures. One of these is a small stick figure in the lower left corner of the grouping. The second human figure is a middle-size figure along the bottom to the right of center. The largest bipedal figure is more interesting. While it appears to be a human figure, it also has large horns and what may be a second set of arms. This suggests it may represent a spirit figure. The other seven figures depict four-legged animals. They could be game animals or hunting dogs. One of the animals in the center of the petroglyph grouping appears to have a rider. However, experts note that the patina of the riding figure is different than the four-legged animal it is riding on or any of the other figures. This indicates that the rider was probably added after the original carving was done. If that is true, the original figure may have been a mountain sheep or another game animal.

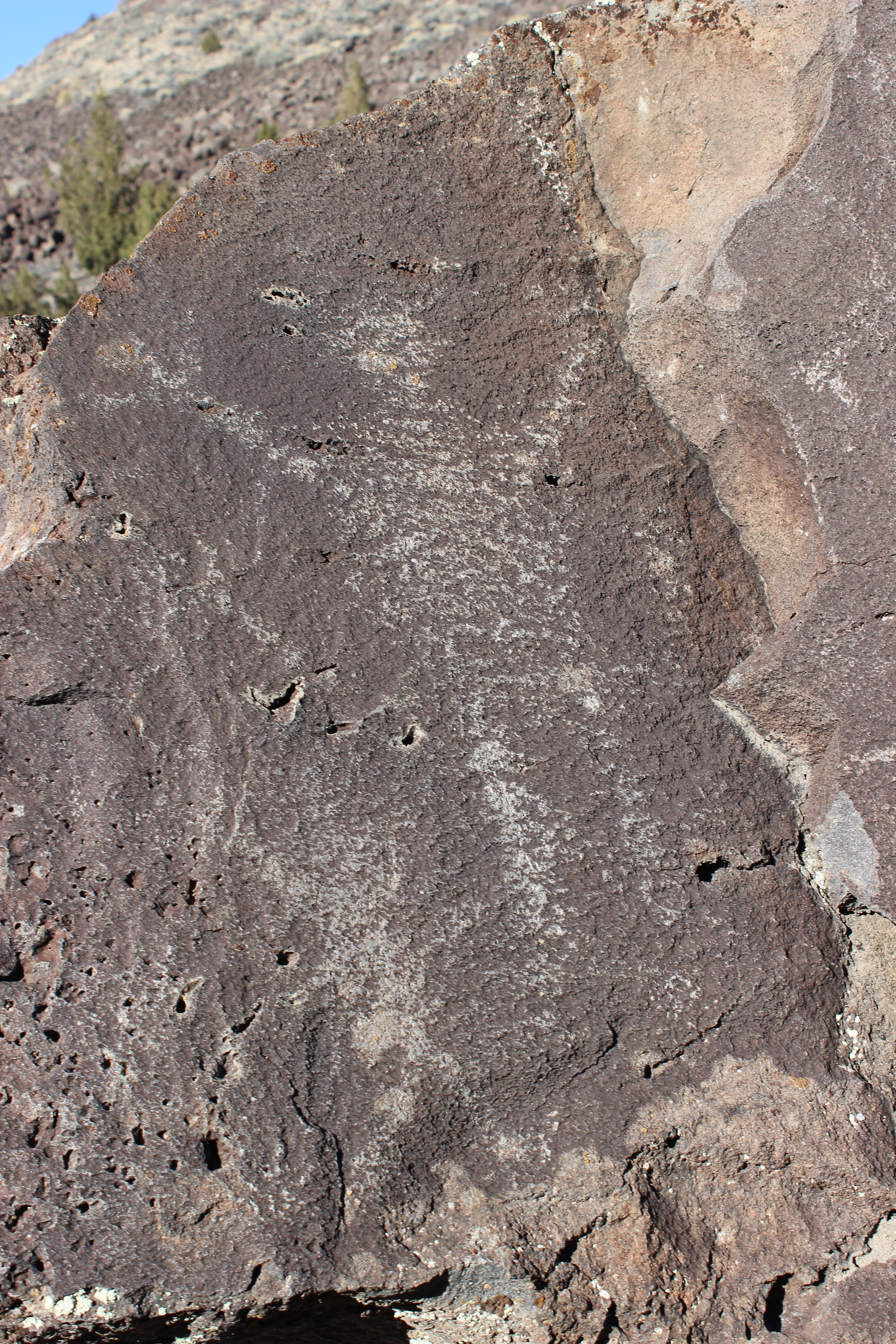
Human and spirit figure

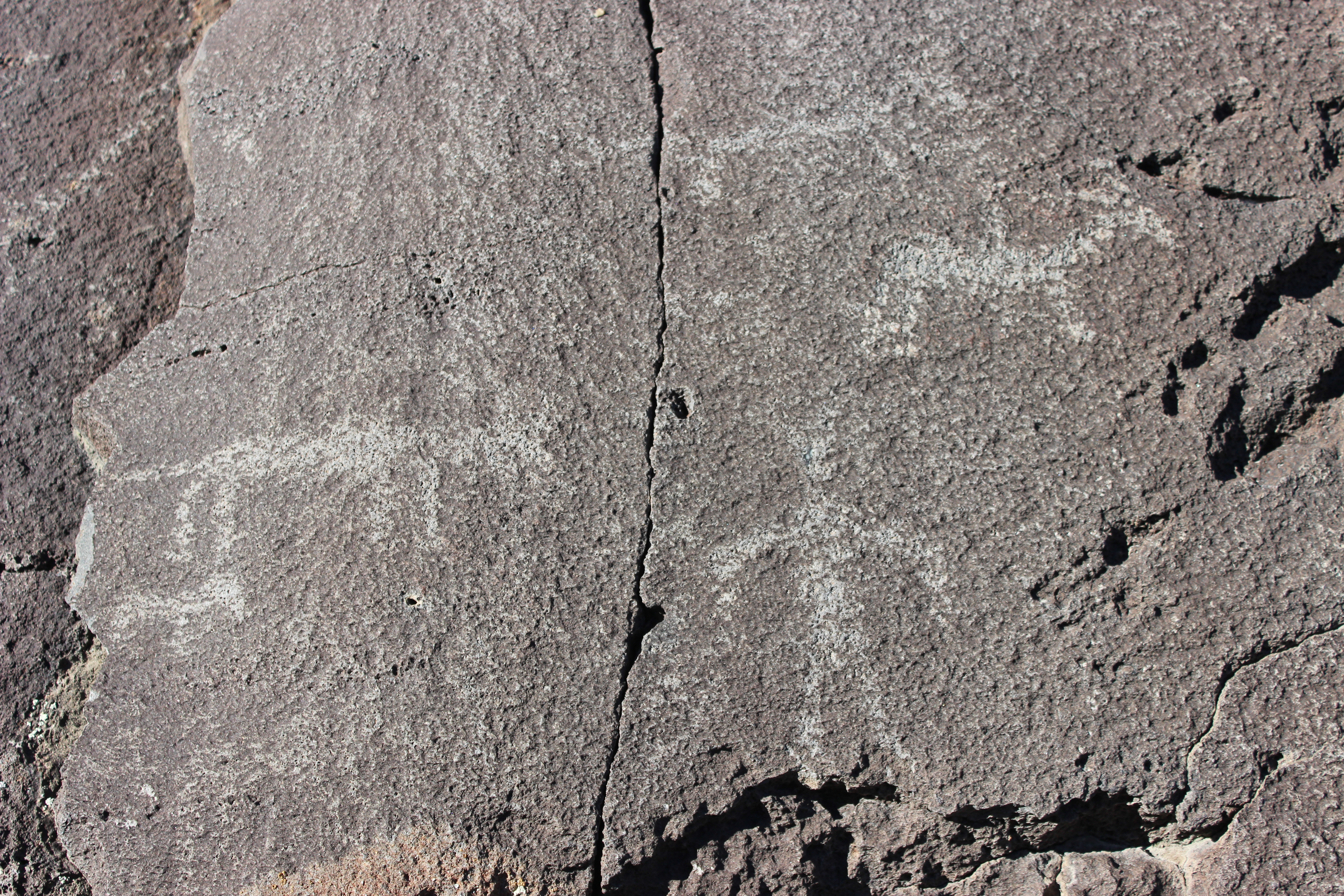
Human and animal figures

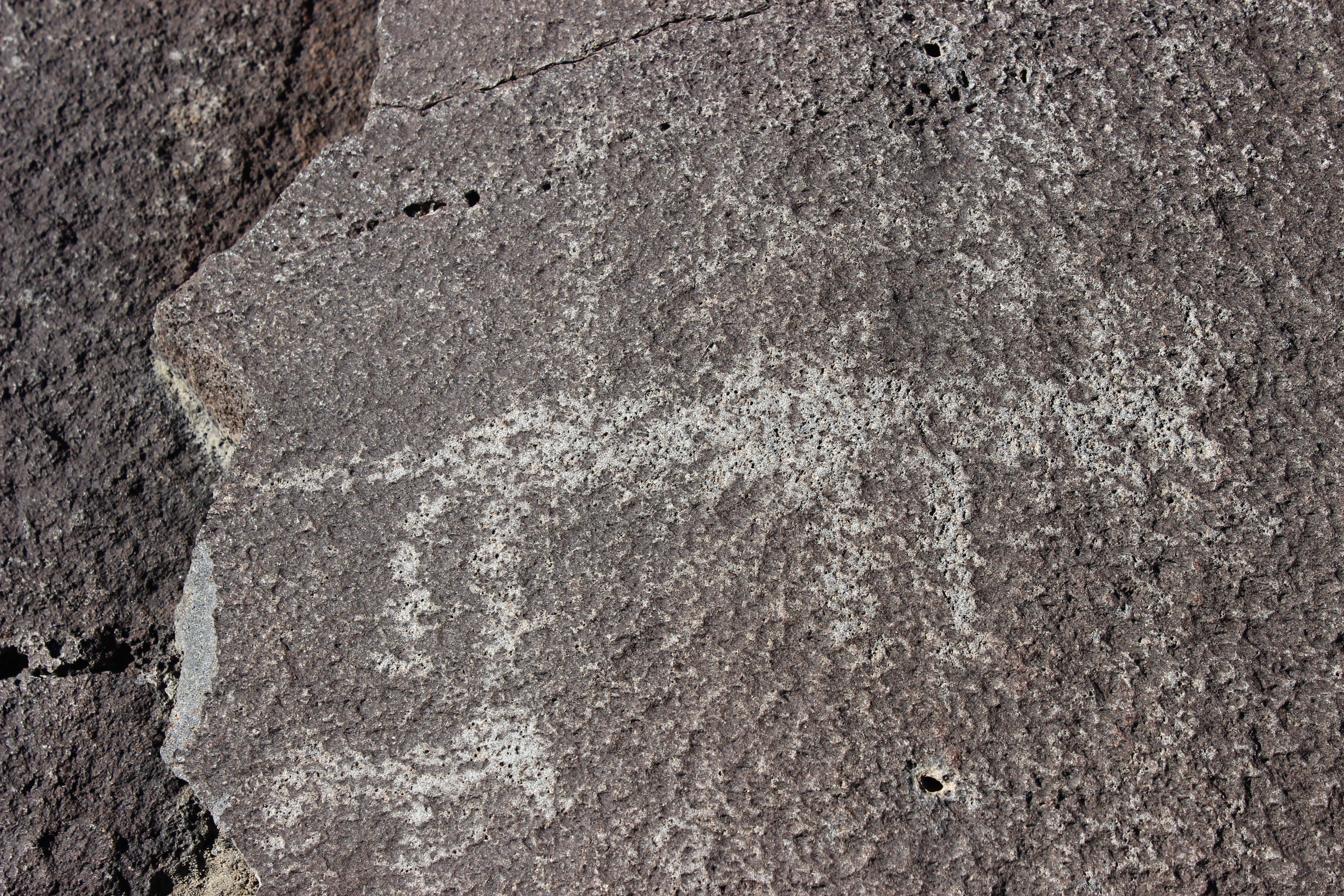
Two animal figures

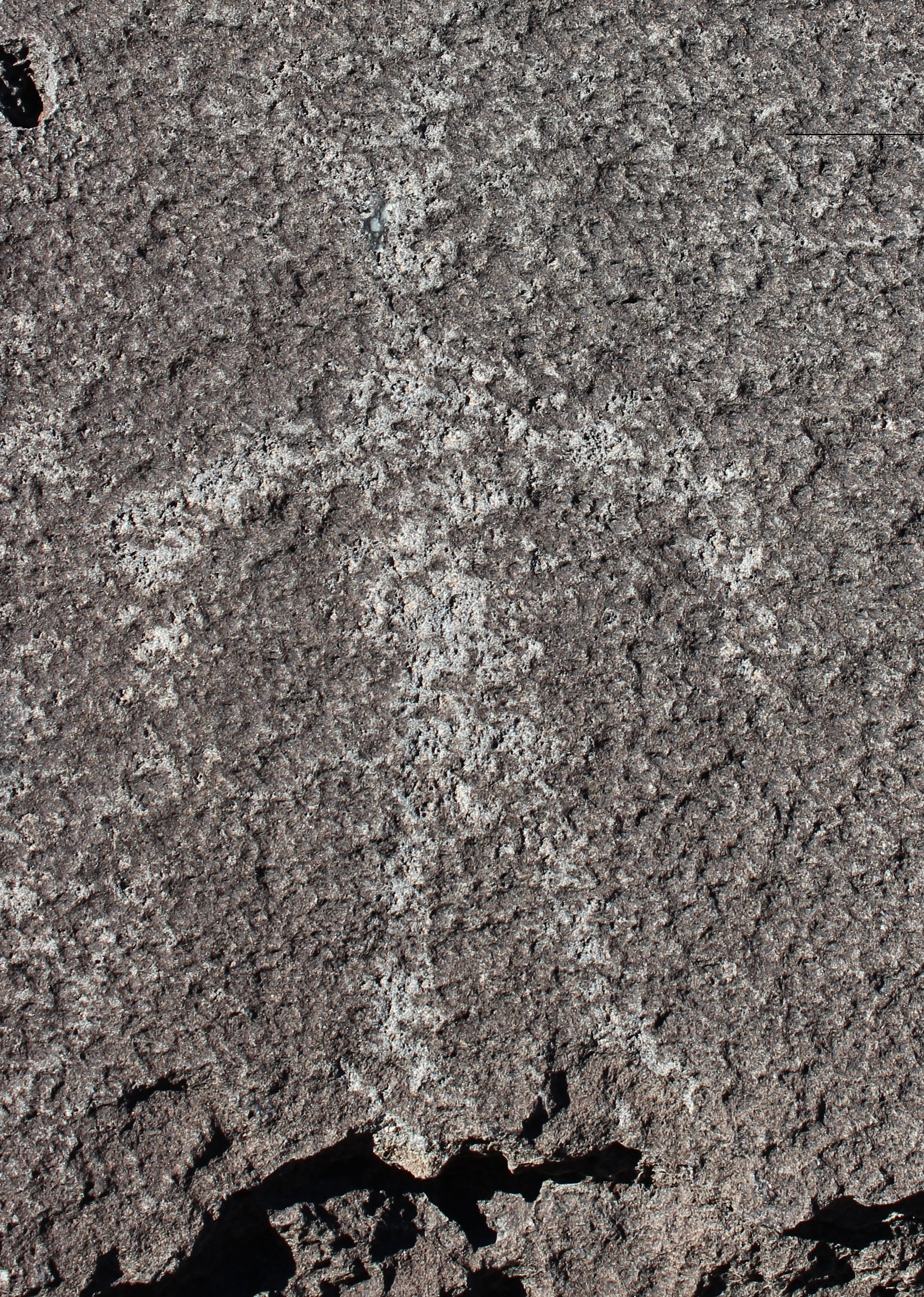
Central human figure

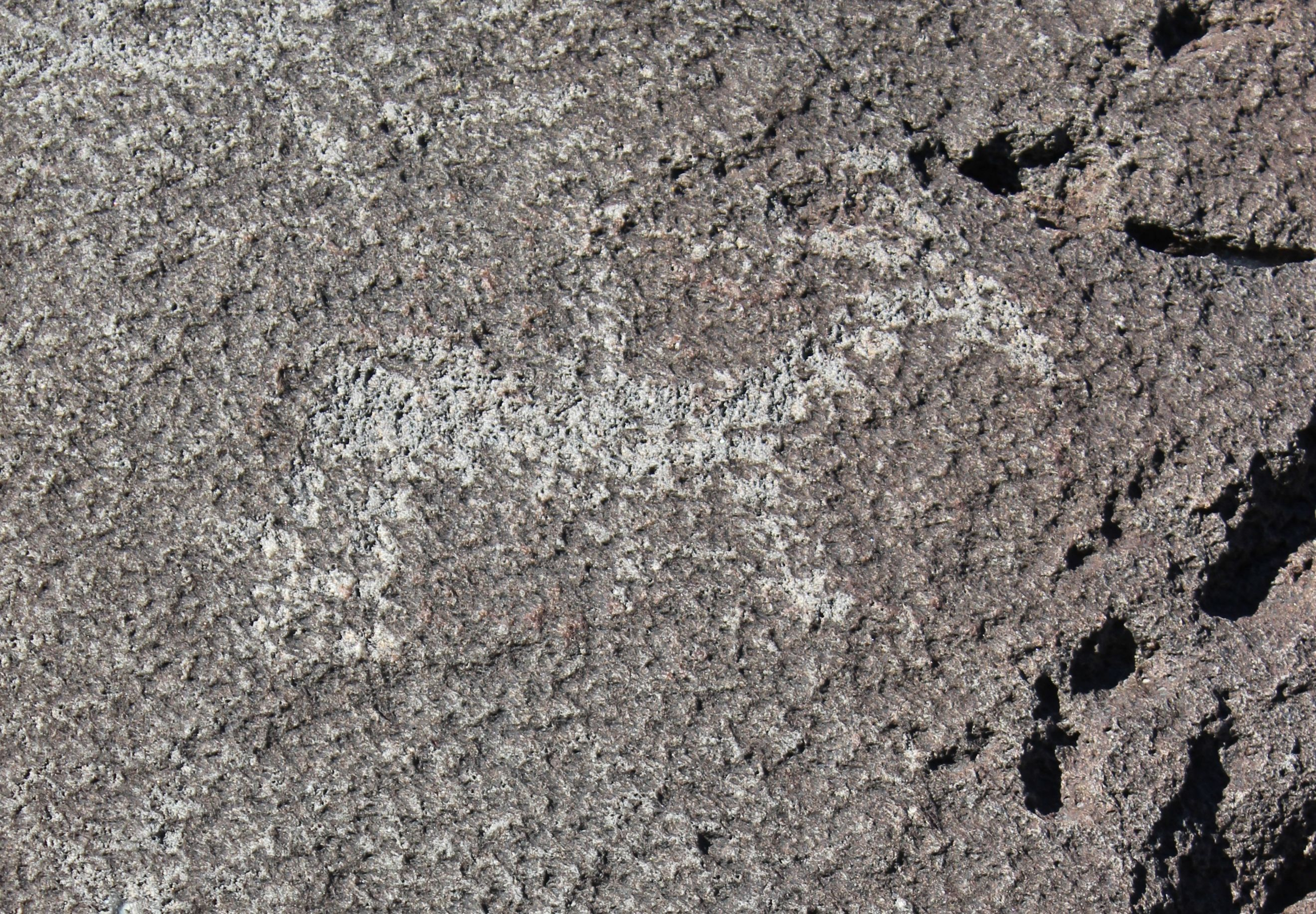
Mounted animal figure

== Protection ==
Fortunately the Picture Rock Pass site has been free from vandalization, but the petroglyphs remain very fragile and must be protected. Because prehistoric petroglyph sites have great archeological value and are often associated with Native American cultural practices, they are identified for protection when located on United States Government lands. A majority of the government-owned petroglyph sites have been officially designated as Areas of Critical Environmental Concern. This ensures that these cultural resources are preserved and protected.

Because of its cultural significance and unique archaeological value, the Picture Rock Pass Petroglyphs Site was listed on the National Register of Historic Places on 28 August 1975. The Bureau of Land Management has mapped and documented the Picture Rock Pass Petroglyphs Site to record its condition. Photographs are used to compare site conditions over time. Volunteers from the Archaeological Society of Central Oregon help Bureau of Land Management cultural and law enforcement specialists monitor the site.

== Location ==
The Picture Rock Pass petroglyphs are located on Bureau of Land Management property just south of Oregon Route 31 between the small unincorporated communities of Silver Lake and Summer Lake. The location of the petroglyphs is not well marked, but the site is less than 100 feet (30 m) from the highway.
