= Summer Lake =

Summer Lake is the name of several geographic features, including:

- Summer Lake (Oregon), a lake in the U.S. state of Oregon
  - Summer Lake, Oregon, a small community near the lake
  - Summer Lake Wildlife Area, a 30-square-mile (78 km^{2}) wildlife area surrounding the lake

Summer Lake can also refer to:

- Lacus Aestatis, an area on Earth's moon
