= Ana River =

River in Oregon, United States of America

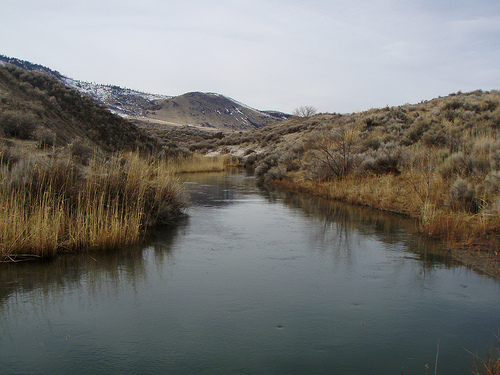
- Ana River near Summer Lake, Oregon

Physical characteristics
- Source
  - location: Springs near and under Ana Reservoir
  - coordinates: 42.99749°N 120.75839°W
  - elevation: 4,226 ft (1,288 m)
- Mouth
  - location: Summer Lake
  - coordinates: 42.90333°N 120.76778°W
  - elevation: 4,150 ft (1,260 m)
- Length: 7 mi (11 km)
- Discharge
  - average: 90 cu ft/s (2.5 m^{3}/s)

The Ana River is a short spring-fed river in south-central Oregon. It is on the northwestern edge of the Great Basin drainage. It flows 7 miles (11 km) from springs at the foot of Winter Ridge through high desert, range, and wetlands before emptying into Summer Lake. For most of its course, the Ana River flows through the Summer Lake Wildlife Area, which is maintained by the Oregon Department of Fish and Wildlife. The river provides habitat for many mammal and bird species, as well as several fish species, including the rare Summer Lake Tui chub. The largest hybrid striped bass ever caught in Oregon was taken from Ana Reservoir in 2009.

== Watershed ==
The Ana River is located a few miles east of the small unincorporated community of Summer Lake, Oregon. The river flows for 7 miles (11 km) through the high desert country of Lake County, Oregon, before draining into Summer Lake. The river was named by W. H. Byars, Oregon's surveyor general from 1890 to 1894, who surveyed the land around Summer Lake. Byars named the river after his daughter.

The Ana River watershed is very small. As a result, runoff from snow melt and overland drainage is minimal except during major thunderstorms that produce direct precipitation on areas immediately adjacent to the river. The river is fed by a number of small springs that produce a relatively constant year-round flow of 80 cubic feet per second (2.3 m^{3}/s) to 90 cubic feet per second (2.5 m^{3}/s). The spring water is a constant 52 °F (11 °C). This helps the reservoir and river maintain a relatively mild water temperature, even during the cold winter months.

== Course ==
The Ana River originates in a series of springs located east of Winter Ridge, a high basin and range escarpment. The source springs are located near and under Ana Reservoir. The 60 acres (0.24 km^{2}) reservoir is owned by the Summer Lake Irrigation District; however, the district's reservoir frontage property is surrounded by the Summer Lake Wildlife Area, a wildlife refuge operated by the Oregon Department of Fish and Wildlife. For most of its course, the Ana River flows through the Summer Lake Wildlife Area.

After leaving the reservoir, the Ana River flows southeast for approximately 2 miles (3.2 km) with private ranch land on its north bank and the Summer Lake Wildlife Area on the south bank. Then for a short distance, the river passes through Bureau of Land Management range land. As the river enters the Bureau of Land Management area, it turns south, reaching the River Ranch Campground in the Summer Lake Wildlife Area in about two miles.

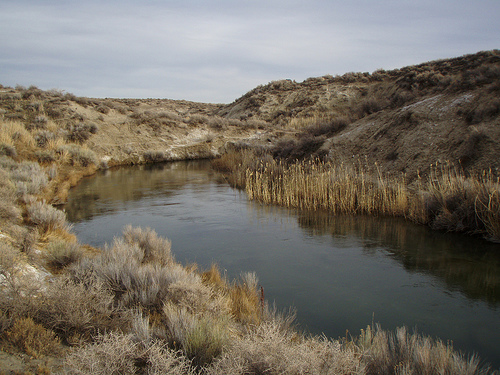
Upper Ana River flowing through high desert

Between Ana Reservoir and the River Ranch Campground, the Ana River retains its natural features and topography. It has a clearly defined channel, an unconsolidated bottom, and a narrow border of water dependent vegetation. The native aquatic vegetation is well established in that part of the river. In this area, the river flows through a small canyon with open range on both sides of the river. The vegetation along the river is dominated by big sagebrush, rabbitbrush, greasewood, needlegrass, ricegrass, and squirreltail. Trees are rare along the Ana River. However, there are a few native western juniper and small cottonwood and willow groves that were planted by early homesteaders.

Just after the River Ranch Campground, the Ana River turns toward the southwest and flows through a large impounded wetland. In this area, the Oregon Department of Fish and Wildlife uses a series of man-made dikes and channels to maintain critical wildlife habitat. The wetlands and marsh pools cover approximately 4,500 acres (18 km^{2}). Throughout the area, water from the river's main channel is diverted to maintain the wetland areas. In the marsh, vegetation varies from sedges, rushes, and bluegrass in the wetland meadows to cattails and bulrushes around the marsh pools.

In the lower part of the river, the water becomes increasingly alkaline. Approximately 7 miles (11 km) from its source, the Ana River empties into the north end of Summer Lake. At its mouth, the Ana River is very shallow, spreading out as it flows into the large endorheic lake.

== Ecology ==
The Ana River is extremely important because it provides the only riparian habitat in the Summer Lake valley. It also feeds the wetlands that host hundreds of thousands of migratory birds. In 2005, the Oregon Department of Fish and Wildlife joined with the United States Department of Agriculture's Natural Resources Conservation Service, Ducks Unlimited, Oregon Hunters Association, and the North American Wetlands Conservation Council to enhance approximately 1,000 acres (4.0 km^{2}) of seasonally flooded wetland habitat in the River Ranch area of the Summer Lake Wildlife Area. The project replaced a series of diversion structures along the Ana River that supply water to the adjacent wetlands. The project significantly improved the efficiency of the water management system, benefiting both the river and wetland habitats. Today, Ana River habitat supports 40 species of mammals, at least 280 species of birds, 15 species of reptiles and amphibians, and eight fish species.

The Ana River provides habitat for river wildlife such as beaver and muskrats. The river also supports non-aquatic animals. Common animals in the Ana River area include Nuttall's cottontail, black-tailed jackrabbits, yellow-bellied marmot, chipmunks, Belding's ground squirrels, California ground squirrels, long-tailed weasels, mink, raccoons, striped skunks, mule deer, coyotes, and bobcats. There are also three bat species that live in the Ana River area.

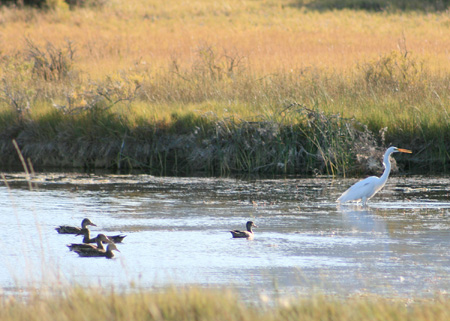
Egret and ducks at Summer Lake Wildlife Area

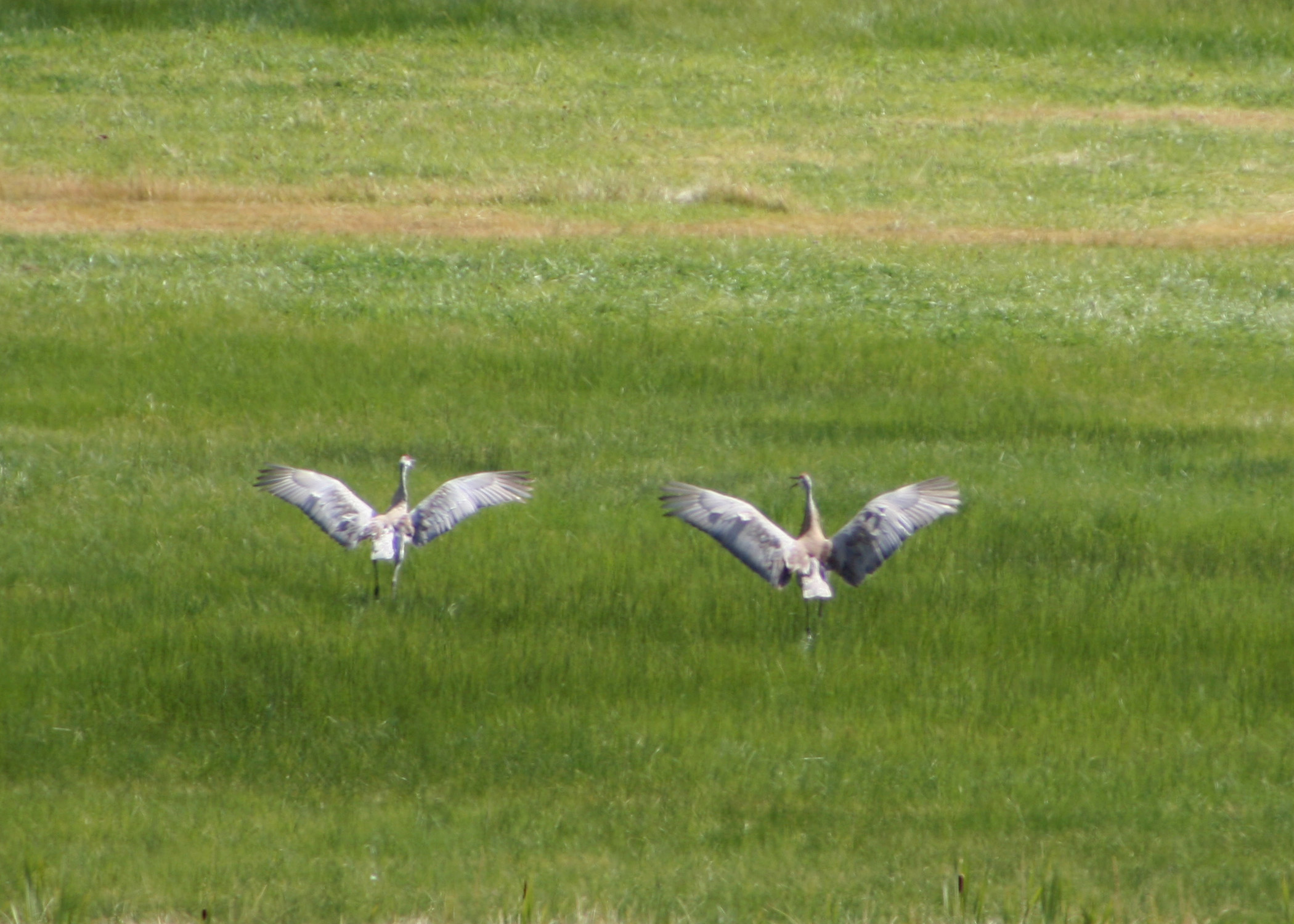
Sandhill cranes in meadow near Ana River

Ana River habitats support a diverse population of upland game birds, songbirds, shorebirds, waterfowl, and birds of prey. In the dry high desert country along the upper Ana River, California quail and mourning doves are very common. There is also a small breeding population of ring-necked pheasants in that area along with greater sage grouse, and chukars. Songbirds common to the upper Ana River area include bullock's orioles, sage thrashers, canyon wrens, rock wrens, and sagebrush sparrows. Songbirds commonly found in the marshy areas of the lower Ana River include Brewer's sparrows, lark sparrows, marsh wrens, red-winged blackbirds, and yellow-headed blackbirds.

Numerous shorebirds nest along the Ana River and in the wetland it feeds. These include American avocets, black-necked stilts, western snowy plovers, spotted sandpipers, Wilson's phalaropes, Wilson's snipes, long-billed curlews, western willets, and killdeer. In the marshes along the lower Ana River, there are large nesting populations of Canada geese, mallards, cinnamon teal, blue-winged teal, gadwall, American coots, and redhead ducks. Great egrets, snowy egrets, black-crowned night herons, white-faced ibis, double-crested cormorants, Caspian terns, American white pelicans, Forster's terns, and sandhill cranes also nest in the Ana River wetlands. Additional bird species stop in the Ana River area during their spring and fall migrations. These include trumpeter swans, tundra swans, lesser snow geese, greater white-fronted geese, long-billed dowitchers, Baird's sandpipers, red-necked phalaropes, and dunlins.

Because of the large numbers birds found in the Summer Lake basin, owls, hawks, and other birds of prey are common in the Ana River area. Native owls include great horned owls, barn owls, and short-eared owls. Other birds of prey include prairie falcons, American kestrels, red-tailed hawks, Cooper's hawks, Swainson's hawk, golden eagles, and bald eagles.

The Ana River habitat supports stocked populations of hybrid striped bass and rainbow trout as well native Summer Lake Tui chub and non-native Goose Lake Tui chub. The river's Tui chub range in size from less than an inch to about ten inches in length. Both species of Tui chub are found throughout the Anna River system and provide an important food source for a wide variety of mammals and birds as well as other fish. Hybrid striped bass were introduced into the Ana River in 1982. Hybrid striped bass are sterile so the Oregon Department of Fish and Wildlife stocks the river with approximately 2,000 fingerlings every two years. Like the bass population, all of the river's rainbow trout are stocked. While the river has been stocked with up to 20,000 trout every year since the early 1940s, there is no evidence of trout spawning in any part of the river. While hybrid bass and trout have been found in the lower Ana River, their normal range is limited to the first four miles (6 km) of the river from Ana Reservoir to River Ranch Campground.

== Recreation ==
The Ana River provides a wide variety of recreational opportunities including fishing, birdwatching, wildlife photography, hunting, and camping. For most of its course, the Ana River flows through the Summer Lake Wildlife Area, an 18,941-acre (76.65 km^{2}) wildlife refuge operated by the Oregon Department of Fish and Wildlife. The refuge is open year around. Its facilities include well maintained access roads and parking area, restrooms, picnic areas, nature trails, a canoe launch, camp sites, and interpretive signs. However, there is no drinking water at any of the sites except the refuge headquarters located just off Oregon Route 31 in the small unincorporated community of Summer Lake, Oregon.

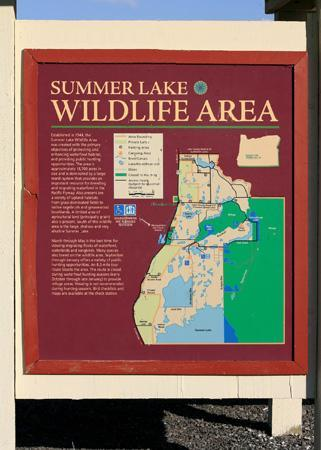
Map of Summer Lake Wildlife Area

Ana Reservoir and the upper Ana River offer excellent fishing that can be accessed from the shore or by canoe or kayak. The reservoir and river are regularly stocked with rainbow trout and hybrid bass. Because of the river's constant mild temperature, fishermen use the river year around. According to the Oregon Department of Fish and Wildlife, the best fishing occurs in the late winter and early spring. Most of the recreational fishing occurs between Ana Reservoir and River Ranch Campground. Rainbow trout range in size fingerings to over 20 inches (510 mm), and the hybrid bass can reach 18 pounds (8.2 kg). In fact, the Oregon state record hybrid bass, weighing 18 pounds and 9.5 ounces, was caught in the Ana Reservoir in 2009.

The Ana River provides critical riparian habitat in an otherwise dry high desert basin. The river supports a wide variety of wildlife especially along the lower Ana River in the Summer Lake Wildlife Area. This wetland area hosts hundreds of thousands of birds during the annual spring and fall Pacific Flyway migrations. Because of the large numbers and variety of birds that use the wetlands and surrounding meadows, the Ana River area is popular for birdwatching and wildlife photography.

Hunters can find a wide variety of waterfowl, upland birds, and big game in the Ana River area. Most of the Summer Lake Wildlife Area is open to hunting during specific seasons. The River Ranch area is particularly popular for waterfowl hunting. During hunting season, the Summer Lake Wildlife Area opens two hours before sunrise and closes a half-hour after sunset.

There are several primitive campgrounds along the Ana River. The River Ranch Campground near the northeast corner of the Summer Lake Wildlife Area is probably the most popular camping area. The River Ranch Campground is located on the east bank of the Ana River's main channel approximately 4 miles (6.4 km) southeast of Ana Reservoir on a gravel access road. The campground has primitive campsites with picnic tables and restrooms; however there is no potable water at the site. There is also a barn and several sheds at the campground used by the Department of Fish and Wildlife for wildlife information and education programs. The refuge closes the campground during hunting season.

The Oregon Department of Fish and Wildlife also maintains several day-use sites along the Ana River. These sites provide access to hiking trails, birdwatching locations, and shoreline fishing. Some of the sites have picnic tables and restrooms, but visitors must bring their own drinking water.

== See also ==
- List of rivers of Oregon
