= Outback Scenic Byway =

National Scenic Byway in Oregon, U.S.

Outback Scenic Byway

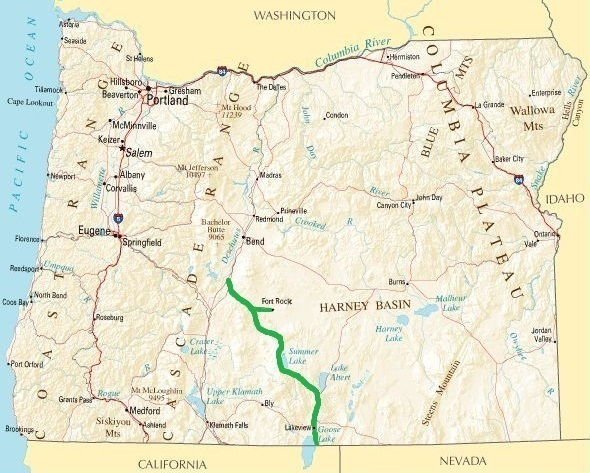
- Outback Scenic Byway highlighted in green

Route information
- Maintained by Oregon Department of Transportation
- Length: 170 mi (270 km)
- Existed: February 19, 1997–present

Major junctions
- North end: US 97 in La Pine
- OR 31 in La Pine
- South end: US 395 in New Pine Creek

Location
- Country: United States
- State: Oregon
- Counties: Deschutes and Lake counties

Highway system
- Scenic Byways; National; National Forest; BLM; NPS; Oregon Highways; Interstate; US; State; Named; Scenic

The Outback Scenic Byway is a designated National Scenic Byway on Oregon state highways that features the scenic rugged landscape of Central Oregon.

== Route description ==
The byway starts in La Pine and runs southeast on Oregon Route 31 for most of its length, then continues at the intersection with U.S. Route 395 to the Oregon-California border ending directly in New Pine Creek. The byway consists of 2-lane, rural roads for its entire length.

It passes multiple natural attractions including Fort Rock State Park, Hole-in-the-Ground and Summer Lake Hot Springs.

The 4 lakes running along the byway are Goose Lake, Lake Albert, Silver Lake and Summer Lake.

== See also ==
- Oregon Outback, an area of Oregon the road travels through
