= Picture Rocks =

Picture Rocks is the name of some places in the United States:

- Picture Rocks, Arizona
- Picture Rocks, Pennsylvania

== See also ==
- Picture Rock Pass Petroglyphs Site, Oregon
- Pictured Rocks National Lakeshore, Michigan
