= Paisley Airport =

- IATA: none; ICAO: none; FAA LID: 22S

Summary
- Airport type: Public
- Owner: Lake County
- Operator: Lake County
- Location: Paisley, Oregon
- Elevation AMSL: 4,395 ft / 1,340 m
- Coordinates: 42°43′04.5470″N 120°33′45.90″W
- Website: http://www.paisley.presys.com/Airport.htm
- Interactive map of Paisley Airport

Runways
| Direction | Length | | Surface |
| Direction | ft | m | Surface |
|---|---|---|---|
| 13/31 | 4,300 | 1,311 | Asphalt |

Paisley Airport (FAA LID: 22S) is a public airport located 3 miles (4.8 km) northwest of Paisley, in Lake County, Oregon, United States, and owned by Lake County. It was originally built for the executives of J.R. Simplot company. The airport is not staffed, but, because it is well lit, it can be used day and night.
