= Summer Lake Wildlife Area =

Wildlife refuge in Oregon

- IUCN category V (protected landscape/seascape)
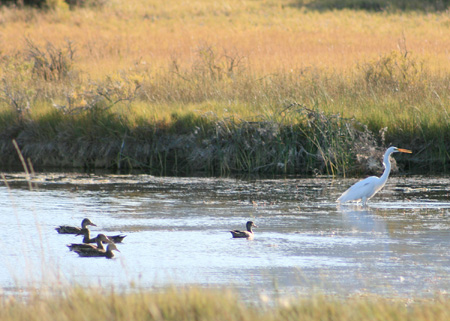
- Egret and ducks in Summer Lake wetlands
- Interactive map of Summer Lake Wildlife Area
- Location: Lake County, Oregon, United States
- Nearest city: Summer Lake, Oregon
- Coordinates: 42.9515°N 120.7633°W
- Area: 18,941 acres (76.65 km^{2})
- Established: 1944
- Visitors: 7,500 (in 2007)
- Governing body: Oregon Department of Fish and Wildlife

The Summer Lake Wildlife Area (also known as Summer Lake State Game Management Area) is a 29.6-square-mile (77 km^{2}) wildlife refuge located on the northwestern edge of the Great Basin drainage in south-central Oregon. It is administered by the Oregon Department of Fish and Wildlife. The refuge is an important stop for waterfowl traveling along the Pacific Flyway during their spring and fall migrations. The Summer Lake Wildlife Area also provides habitat for shorebirds and other bird species as well as wide variety of mammals and several fish species. The Ana River supplies the water for the refuge wetlands.

== History ==
Following a decade of droughts in the 1930s, Federal and state governments joined with private interest group to saving North America's rapidly disappearing wetlands. The result was the creation of many federal and state wildlife refuges. This was especially important along the migratory bird flyways. The Federal Aid to Wildlife Restoration Act of 1937 (also known as the Pittman–Robertson Act) helped finance land acquisition, habitat development, and refuge infrastructure at the Summer Lake Wildlife Area.

The Summer Lake Wildlife Area was established April 12, 1944, to protect and improve the area's waterfowl habitat and provide a site for public hunting. It is located in the northwest corner of the Great Basin drainage in central Lake County, Oregon. The Summer Lake refuge was the first wetland-focused wildlife area established in Oregon. It originally included only 2,500 acres (10 km^{2}) of wetlands north of Summer Lake. Nevertheless, the Summer Lake wetlands were an important stop for migratory waterfowl and shorebirds traveling along the Pacific Flyway. The wildlife area was also home to a wide variety of indigenous bird, mammal, and fish species.

Over the years, the Summer Lake Wildlife Area has grown as additional parcels of land were acquired by purchase, inter-governmental agreement, and private easements. The last two large purchases were in 1963, when the refuge purchased the 2,545-acre (10.30 km^{2}) Williams Ranch expanding the north and east boundaries of the wildlife area, and 1971, when the 1,404-acre (5.68 km^{2}) River Ranch tract was acquired.

Today, the wildlife area extends over 18,941 acres (76.65 km^{2}) of Oregon's high desert range land, meadows, wetlands, marshes, and open playa. The Oregon Department of Fish and Wildlife owns 12,818 acres (51.87 km^{2}) of the refuge's land. An additional 5,124 acres (20.74 km^{2}) are owned by the Bureau of Land Management and other agencies. However, those lands are administered by the Department of Fish and Wildlife as part of the refuge. Finally, there are 999 acres (4.04 km^{2}) of private land covered by easement agreements. The Summer Lake wetlands and neighboring high desert uplands along the Ana River provide habitat for many wildlife species. Because of its large and diverse wildlife population, the Summer Lake Wildlife Area is a popular destination for fishermen, birdwatchers, photographers, and hunters. The sale of hunting licenses remains the sole source of funding for operation and maintenance of the Summer Lake Wildlife Area.

== Habitat ==
The Ana River supplies the water that maintains the Summer Lake Wildlife Area wetlands. For most of its short 7 miles (11 km) course, the Ana River meanders through the Summer Lake Wildlife Area. It flows from a series of springs at the foot of Winter Ridge at the north end of the wildlife area to Summer Lake at the south end of the refuge. The river's source springs are located near and under Ana Reservoir. The 60-acre (24 ha) reservoir is owned by the Summer Lake Irrigation District; however, the district's reservoir frontage is surrounded by the Summer Lake Wildlife Area property. The springs provide a constant 52 °F (11 °C) flow year round. This helps the river maintain a relatively mild water temperature, even during the cold winter months.

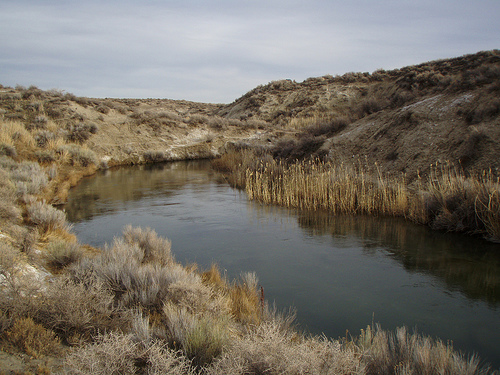
Riparian habitat on the upper Ana River

After leaving the reservoir, the Ana River flows southeast for approximately 2 miles (3.2 km) with private ranch land on its north bank and the Summer Lake Wildlife Area on the south bank. Then for a short distance, the river passes through BLM land administered as part of the refuge. As the river enters the Bureau of Land Management area, it turns south, reaching the River Ranch Campground in the Summer Lake Wildlife Area in about 2 miles (3.2 km). The vegetation along this part of the river is dominated by big sagebrush, rabbitbrush, greasewood, needlegrass, ricegrass, and squirreltail. Native trees are rare along the Ana River except for a few Western juniper.

Just after the River Ranch Campground, the Ana River flows through a large impounded wetland. The wetlands and marsh pools cover approximately 4,500-acre (18 km^{2}). In this area, a series of manmade dikes and channels maintain critical wildlife habitat. In the marsh, vegetation varies from sedges, rushes, and bluegrass in the meadows to cattails and bulrushes around the marsh pools. In the lower part of the river, the water becomes increasingly alkaline. Approximately 7 miles (11 km) from its source, the Ana River empties into the north end of Summer Lake.

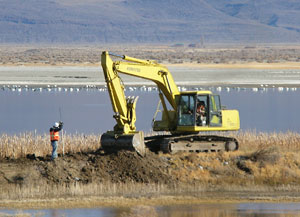
Man-made islands provide bird nesting habitat

The Summer Lake Wildlife Area is extremely important because its wetlands host hundreds of thousands of migratory birds each year. In 2005, the Oregon Department of Fish and Wildlife joined with the U.S. Department of Agriculture's Natural Resources Conservation Service, Oregon Hunters Association, Ducks Unlimited, and the North American Wetlands Conservation Council to enhance approximately 1,000 acres (4.0 km^{2}) of seasonally flooded wetland habitat in the River Ranch area of the wildlife area. The project replaced a series of diversion structures along the Ana River supplying water to the adjacent wetlands. The project significantly improved the efficiency of the water management system, benefiting both the river and wetlands. In 2009, the United States Army Corps of Engineers built three islands in the Summer Lake wetlands. The islands provide additional nesting sites for Caspian terns and other birds. The project was a joint effort by the Oregon Department of Fish and Wildlife, Army Corps of Engineers, Bureau of Land Management, United States Fish and Wildlife Service, United States Geological Survey, National Oceanic and Atmospheric Administration, Oregon Department of State Lands, and Oregon State University. In 2010, a project financed by the State of Oregon, the Lake County Soil and Water Conservation District, Summer Lake Irrigation District, and Ducks Unlimited revitalized an additional 3,000 acres (12 km^{2}) nesting habitat.

== Wildlife ==
Today, the Summer Lake Wildlife Area supports 40 mammal species, at least 280 species of birds, 15 reptile and amphibian species, and eight fish species. The wildlife area provides habitat for aquatic mammals like beaver and muskrats. The area also supports non-aquatic animals such as Nuttall's cottontail, black-tailed jackrabbits, yellow-bellied marmot, chipmunks, Belding's ground squirrels, California ground squirrels, long-tailed weasels, mink, raccoons, striped skunks, mule deer, coyotes, and bobcats. There are also three bat species which live in the Summer Lake area.

The various Summer Lake habitats supports a diverse population of upland game birds, songbirds, shorebirds, waterfowl, and birds of prey. In the dry high desert country at the north end of the wildlife area, California quail and mourning doves are common. There is also a small breeding population of ring-necked pheasants along with greater sage grouse and chukars. Songbirds common to that area include Bullock's orioles, sage thrashers, canyon wrens, rock wrens, and sagebrush sparrows. Songbirds commonly found in the marshy areas of the lower Ana River include Brewer's sparrows, lark sparrows, marsh wrens, red-winged blackbirds, and yellow-headed blackbirds.

Numerous shorebirds nest in the Summer Lake Wildlife Area. These include American avocets, black-necked stilts, western snowy plovers, spotted sandpipers, Wilson's phalaropes, Wilson's snipes, long-billed curlews, western willets, and killdeer. Sandhill cranes, great egrets, snowy egrets, black-crowned night herons, white-faced ibis, double-crested cormorants, Caspian terns, American white pelicans, and Forster's terns also nest in the Summer Lake wetlands. The wildlife area hosts large nesting populations of waterfowl including Canada geese, mallards, cinnamon teal, blue-winged teal, gadwalls, American coots, and redhead ducks. Additional bird species stop in the Summer Lake Wildlife Area during their spring and fall migrations. These include trumpeter swans, tundra swans, snow geese, greater white-fronted geese, long-billed dowitchers, Baird's sandpipers, red-necked phalaropes, and dunlins.

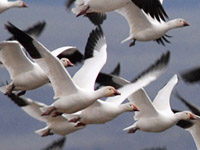
Snow geese

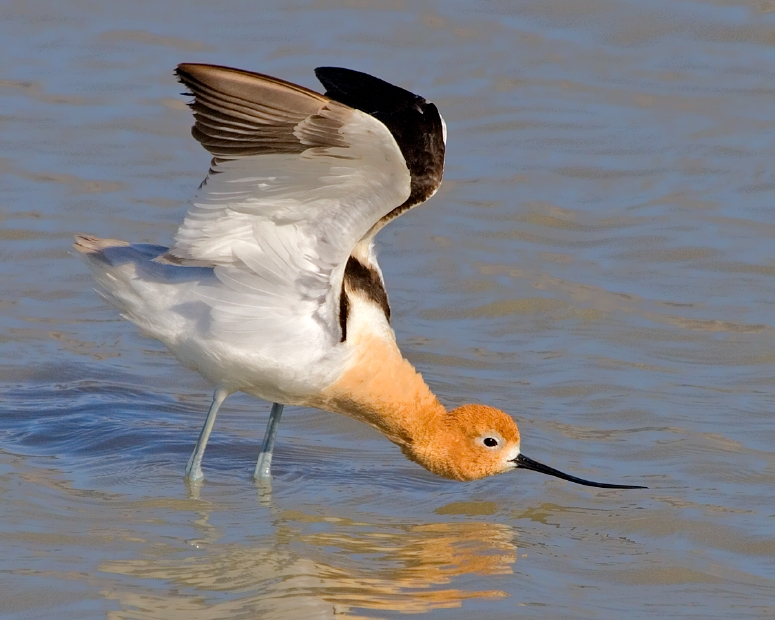
American avocet

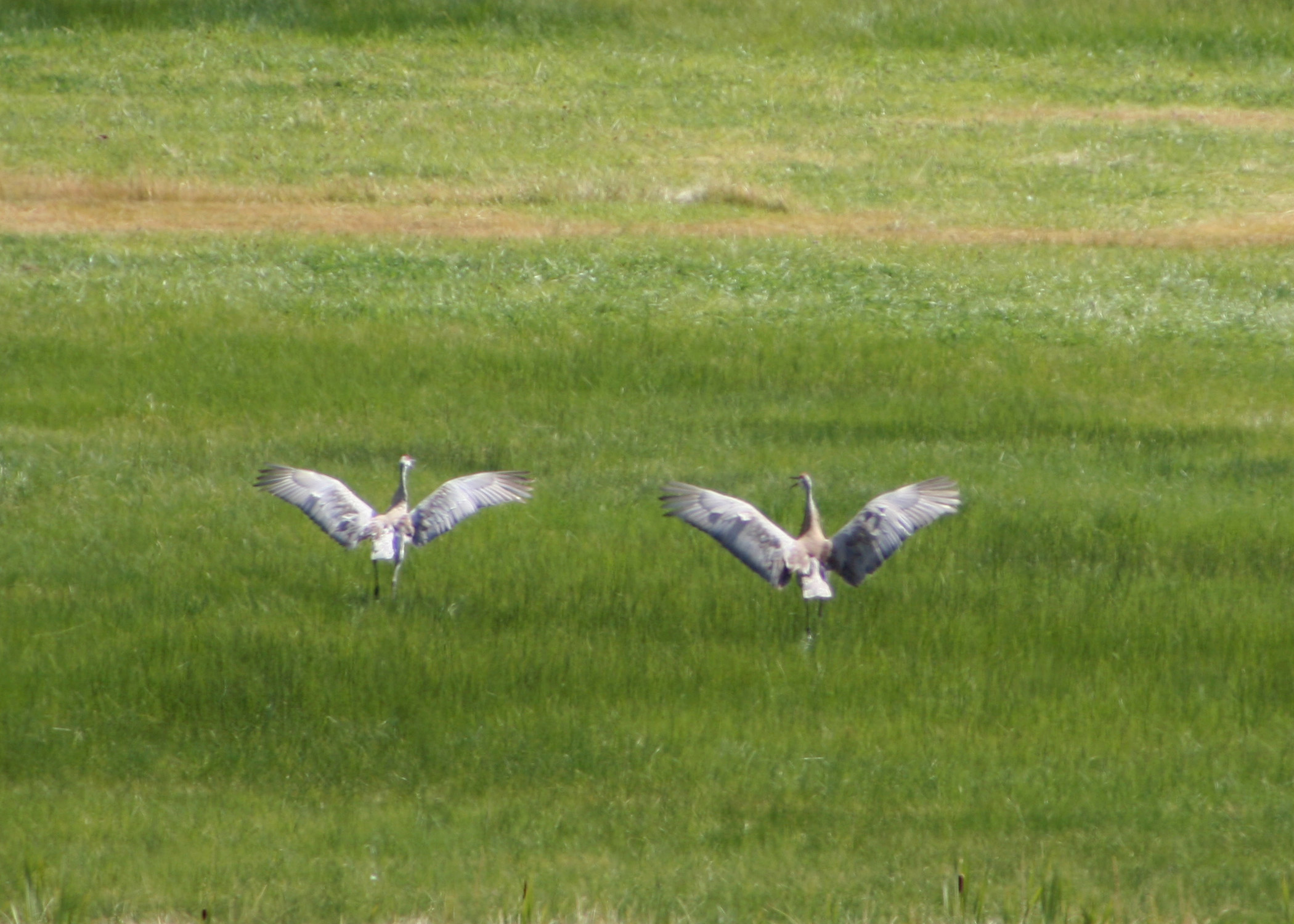
Sandhill cranes

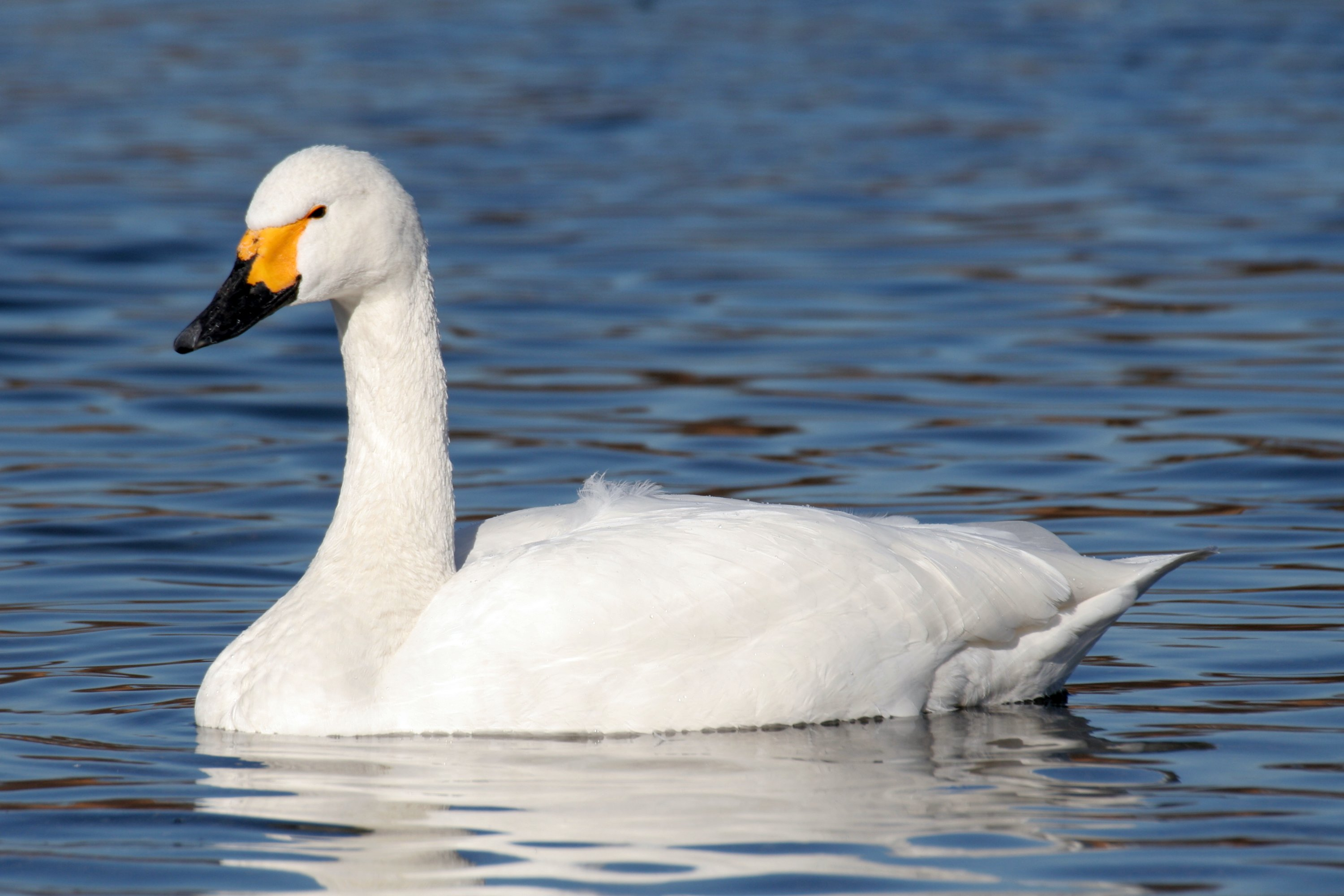
Tundra swan

Because of the large numbers birds found in the Summer Lake basin, birds of prey are common. Native owls include great horned owls, barn owls, and short-eared owls. Prairie falcons, American kestrels, red-tailed hawks, Cooper's hawks, Swainson's hawk, golden eagles, and bald eagles are also found in the Summer Lake area.

The Ana River has stocked populations of hybrid striped bass and rainbow trout as well native Summer Lake tui chub and non-native Goose Lake tui chub. The river's tui chub range in size from less than an inch to about ten inches in length. Both species of tui chub are found throughout the Anna River system and provide an important food source for a wide variety of mammals and birds as well as other fish. Oregon Department of Fish and Wildlife stocks the river with approximately 2,000 hybrid bass fingerings every two years. Like the bass population, all of the river's rainbow trout are stocked. While the river has been stocked with up to 20,000 trout every year since the early 1940s, there is no evidence of trout spawning in any part of the river.

== Recreation ==
The Summer Lake Wildlife Area provides a wide variety of recreational opportunities including fishing, birdwatching, wildlife photography, hunting, and camping. The refuge is open year-round. Its facilities include well maintained access roads and parking area, restrooms, picnic areas, nature trails, a canoe launch, camp sites, and interpretive signs. Approximately 7,500 people visit the refuge each year. However, there is no drinking water at any of the sites except the refuge headquarters located just off Oregon Route 31 in the small unincorporated community of Summer Lake, Oregon.

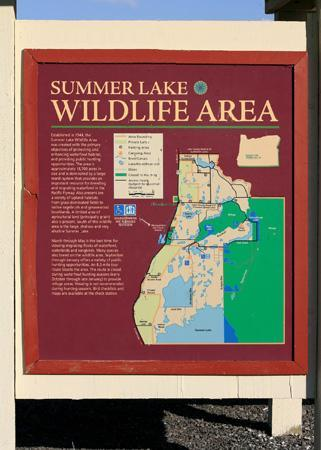
Map of Summer Lake Wildlife Area

The upper Ana River offer excellent fishing that can be accessed from the shore or by canoe or kayak. The Oregon Department of Fish and Wildlife regularly stocked the river with rainbow trout and hybrid bass. Because of the river's constant temperature, fishermen access the river year round. According to the Department of Fish and Wildlife, the best fishing occurs in the late winter and early spring. While trout and hybrid bass have been found in the lower Ana River, their normal range is limited to the first four miles (6 km) of the river from Ana Reservoir to River Ranch Campground. Rainbow trout range in size from fingerlings to over 20 inches (510 mm), and the hybrid bass can reach 18 pounds (8.2 kg).

The Summer Lake Wildlife Area provides critical wetland habitat. These wetlands host hundreds of thousands of birds during the annual spring and fall migrations along the Pacific Flyway. Because of the large numbers and wide variety of birds that use the Summer Lake wetlands and meadows, the refuge area is popular for birdwatching, wildlife photography, and hunting.

Hunters can find a variety of waterfowl, upland birds, and big game in the Summer Lake Wildlife Area. Most of the wildlife area is open to hunting during specific seasons. The River Ranch area is particularly popular for waterfowl hunting. During hunting season, the Summer Lake Wildlife Area opens two hours before sunrise and closes a half-hour after sunset.

The Summer Lake Wildlife Area maintains four primitive campgrounds. The River Ranch Campground near the northeast corner of the wildlife area is probably the most popular camping area. The River Ranch Campground is located on the east bank of the Ana River's main channel approximately 4 miles (6.4 km) southeast of Ana Reservoir on a gravel access road. The campground has primitive campsites with picnic tables and restrooms. There is also a barn and several sheds at the site which the Department of Fish and Wildlife uses for refuge information and education programs. The Department of Fish and Wildlife closes all four campgrounds during hunting season.

The Oregon Department of Fish and Wildlife also maintains several day-use sites along the Ana River. These sites provide access to hiking trails, bird watching locations, and shoreline fishing. Some of the sites have picnic tables and restrooms, but visitors must bring their own drinking water.

== See also ==
- Oregon Department of Fish and Wildlife for list of state wildlife areas
