= Summer Lake, Oregon =

Unincorporated community in the state of Oregon, United States

- Unincorporated community
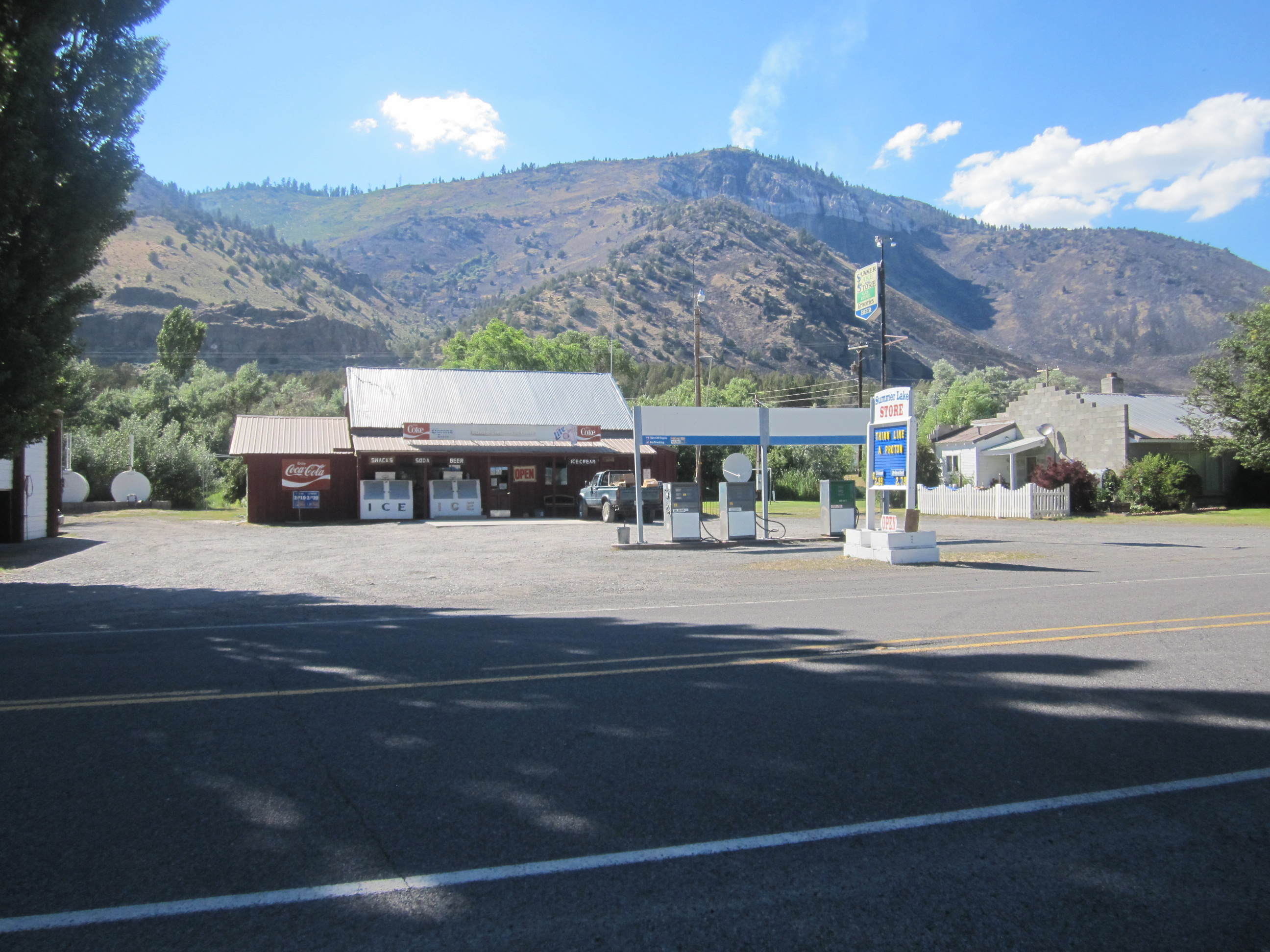
- Summer Lake Store

- Location within Oregon Location within the United States
- Coordinates: 42°58′23″N 120°46′39″W
- Country: United States
- State: Oregon
- County: Lake
- Elevation: 4,229 ft (1,289 m)

Population (2005)
  - Total: 90
- Time zone: UTC-8 (Pacific)
  - Summer (DST): UTC-7 (Pacific)
- ZIP code: 97640
- GNIS feature ID: 1150596

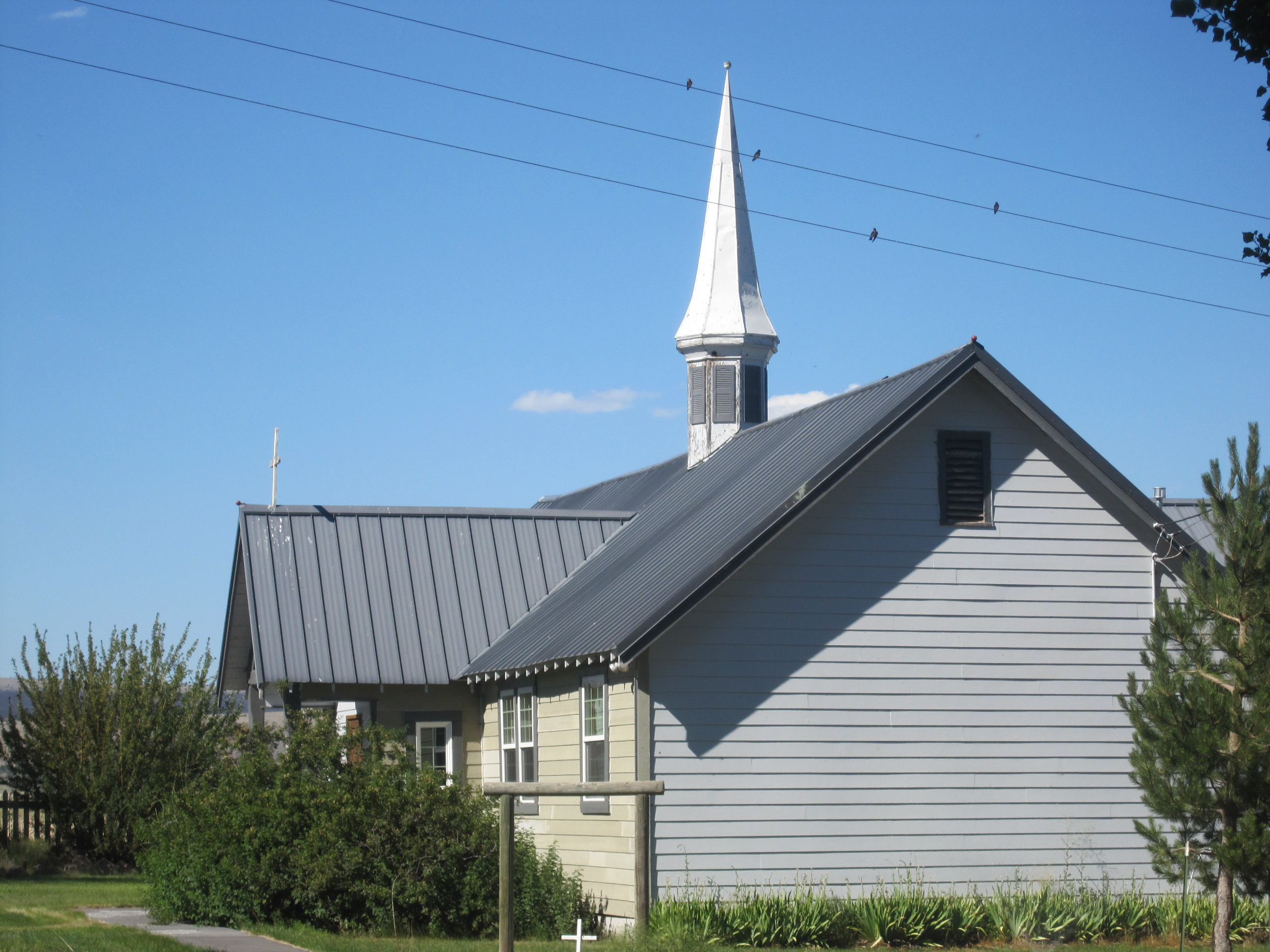
Church in Summer Lake

Summer Lake is an unincorporated community in northwest Lake County, Oregon, United States. It is on Oregon Route 31 approximately halfway between Bend and Lakeview. It is at the base of the eastern slope of Winter Ridge adjacent to the Fremont–Winema National Forests.

== History ==
Summer Lake, for which the town is named, is one of the largest in Oregon at approximately 20 miles (32 km) long and 10 miles (16 km) wide. It was named by Captain John C. Frémont during his 1843 mapping expedition through Central Oregon.

Frémont and his Army Topographical team were mapping the Oregon Country as they traveled from The Dalles on Columbia River to Sutter's Fort in Sacramento, California. On December 16, 1843, the expedition struggled down a steep cliff from a snow-covered plateau to reach a lake in the valley below. Frémont named them "Winter Ridge" and "Summer Lake." From the rocky cliff overlooking the lake basin, Frémont described the discovery and naming of Summer Lake as follows:

"At our feet...more than a thousand feet below...we looked into a green prairie country, in which a beautiful lake, some twenty miles (32 km) in length, was spread along the foot of the mountain...Shivering on snow three feet deep, and stiffening in a cold north wind, we exclaimed at once that the names of Summer Lake and Winter Ridge should be applied to these proximate places of such sudden and violent contrast." (Captain John C. Frémont, December 16, 1843, Report of the Second Frémont Expedition)

The first settlers began to arrive in the Summer Lake Valley around 1870. However, the high desert was difficult to farm, and many early settlers stayed only a few years before moving on to greener country. As a result, the population of the valley never grew beyond a few hundred people.

== Climate ==
Summer Lake has a borderline Mediterranean (Köppen Csb)/continental Mediterranean (Dsb) climate, quite typical for upland Oregon and characterised by cold winters and summers with chilly mornings and hot afternoons. The rain shadow of the Cascades makes the climate quite dry, limiting snowfall in the winter to 7.4 inches (0.19 m), with a monthly maximum of 26.9 inches (0.68 m) in January 1969 and a seasonal maximum of 55.9 inches (1.42 m) between July 1970 and June 1971. Occasionally very cold Arctic air will cross over from the Rocky Mountains: the coldest month since records began in 1957 has been January 1962 with a mean of 24.3 °F (−4.3 °C) and a record low of −27 °F (−32.8 °C) on January 22 that year; however, on average only 1.2 mornings per winter can be expected to fall to or below 0 °F (−17.8 °C) and only 6.9 afternoons do not top freezing, although 147.1 mornings will fall below freezing per year.

Precipitation peaks in December and January, though even these months are much less wet than Western Oregon: the wettest month since records began in December 1964 with 12.57 inches (319.3 mm) and October 1962 with 7.52 inches (191.0 mm) are the only months to exceed 6 inches (152.4 mm), whilst the highest “rain year” total is 22.31 inches (566.7 mm) between July 1964 and June 1965 and the lowest only 5.44 inches (138.2 mm) between July 1967 and June 1968.

Spring typically warms up rapidly, although cold nights are normal into June: the last freezing minimum can be expected around May 27 and the first fall freeze around September 21. During the summer, afternoons are typically hot: an average summer will see 42.6 afternoons reach 90 °F (32.2 °C) and 2.7 exceed 100 °F or 37.8 °C. The record high temperature is 108 °F (42.2 °C) on July 30, 2022, and the record high minimum is 75 °F (23.9 °C) on July 13, 2002. Rainfall is not common during the summer, although July 1987 saw 3.87 inches or 98.3 millimetres fall, of which 3.05 inches or 77.5 millimetres fell in two days from a huge storm which saw maxima fall as low as 44 °F (6.7 °C) after having been 96 °F or 35.6 °C two afternoons previously.

Climate data for Summer Lake, Oregon, 1991-2020 normals, extremes 1957–present
Month	Jan	Feb	Mar	Apr	May	Jun	Jul	Aug	Sep	Oct	Nov	Dec	Year
Record high °F (°C)	63 (17)	70 (21)	79 (26)	86 (30)	96 (36)	102 (39)	108 (42)	104 (40)	104 (40)	96 (36)	77 (25)	65 (18)	108 (42)
Mean maximum °F (°C)	57.4 (14.1)	60.4 (15.8)	68.9 (20.5)	77.1 (25.1)	85.9 (29.9)	93.2 (34.0)	99.0 (37.2)	98.7 (37.1)	93.6 (34.2)	82.0 (27.8)	67.7 (19.8)	55.9 (13.3)	100.7 (38.2)
Mean daily maximum °F (°C)	44.4 (6.9)	47.5 (8.6)	54.0 (12.2)	60.4 (15.8)	70.1 (21.2)	79.2 (26.2)	89.7 (32.1)	88.7 (31.5)	80.9 (27.2)	66.3 (19.1)	51.0 (10.6)	42.5 (5.8)	64.6 (18.1)
Daily mean °F (°C)	32.9 (0.5)	35.4 (1.9)	40.5 (4.7)	45.5 (7.5)	53.7 (12.1)	61.1 (16.2)	69.4 (20.8)	67.8 (19.9)	60.2 (15.7)	48.9 (9.4)	38.3 (3.5)	31.7 (−0.2)	48.8 (9.3)
Mean daily minimum °F (°C)	21.5 (−5.8)	23.3 (−4.8)	27.0 (−2.8)	30.6 (−0.8)	37.3 (2.9)	43.0 (6.1)	49.0 (9.4)	46.8 (8.2)	39.6 (4.2)	31.6 (−0.2)	25.5 (−3.6)	21.0 (−6.1)	33.0 (0.6)
Mean minimum °F (°C)	8.6 (−13.0)	11.7 (−11.3)	17.0 (−8.3)	21.8 (−5.7)	27.1 (−2.7)	33.4 (0.8)	41.1 (5.1)	39.6 (4.2)	30.8 (−0.7)	20.3 (−6.5)	11.7 (−11.3)	7.0 (−13.9)	1.4 (−17.0)
Record low °F (°C)	−27 (−33)	−16 (−27)	1 (−17)	12 (−11)	26 (−3)	27 (−3)	33 (1)	27 (−3)	21 (−6)	6 (−14)	−14 (−26)	−19 (−28)	−27 (−33)
Average precipitation inches (mm)	1.58 (40)	1.20 (30)	1.20 (30)	1.18 (30)	1.41 (36)	0.82 (21)	0.38 (9.7)	0.42 (11)	0.60 (15)	0.94 (24)	1.48 (38)	1.85 (47)	13.06 (331.7)
Average snowfall inches (cm)	2.0 (5.1)	1.6 (4.1)	0.5 (1.3)	0.0 (0.0)	0.0 (0.0)	0.0 (0.0)	0.0 (0.0)	0.0 (0.0)	0.0 (0.0)	0.0 (0.0)	0.8 (2.0)	2.5 (6.4)	7.4 (18.9)
Average extreme snow depth inches (cm)	2.1 (5.3)	1.8 (4.6)	0.5 (1.3)	0.0 (0.0)	0.0 (0.0)	0.0 (0.0)	0.0 (0.0)	0.0 (0.0)	0.0 (0.0)	0.0 (0.0)	0.8 (2.0)	2.2 (5.6)	4.5 (11)
Average precipitation days (≥ 0.01 in)	12.5	10.9	12.3	12.9	10.6	6.7	3.5	3.0	3.8	7.2	10.9	12.6	106.9
Average snowy days (≥ 0.1 in)	1.4	0.4	0.5	0.0	0.0	0.0	0.0	0.0	0.0	0.0	0.2	1.7	4.2
Source 1: NOAA
Source 2: National Weather Service

== Economy ==
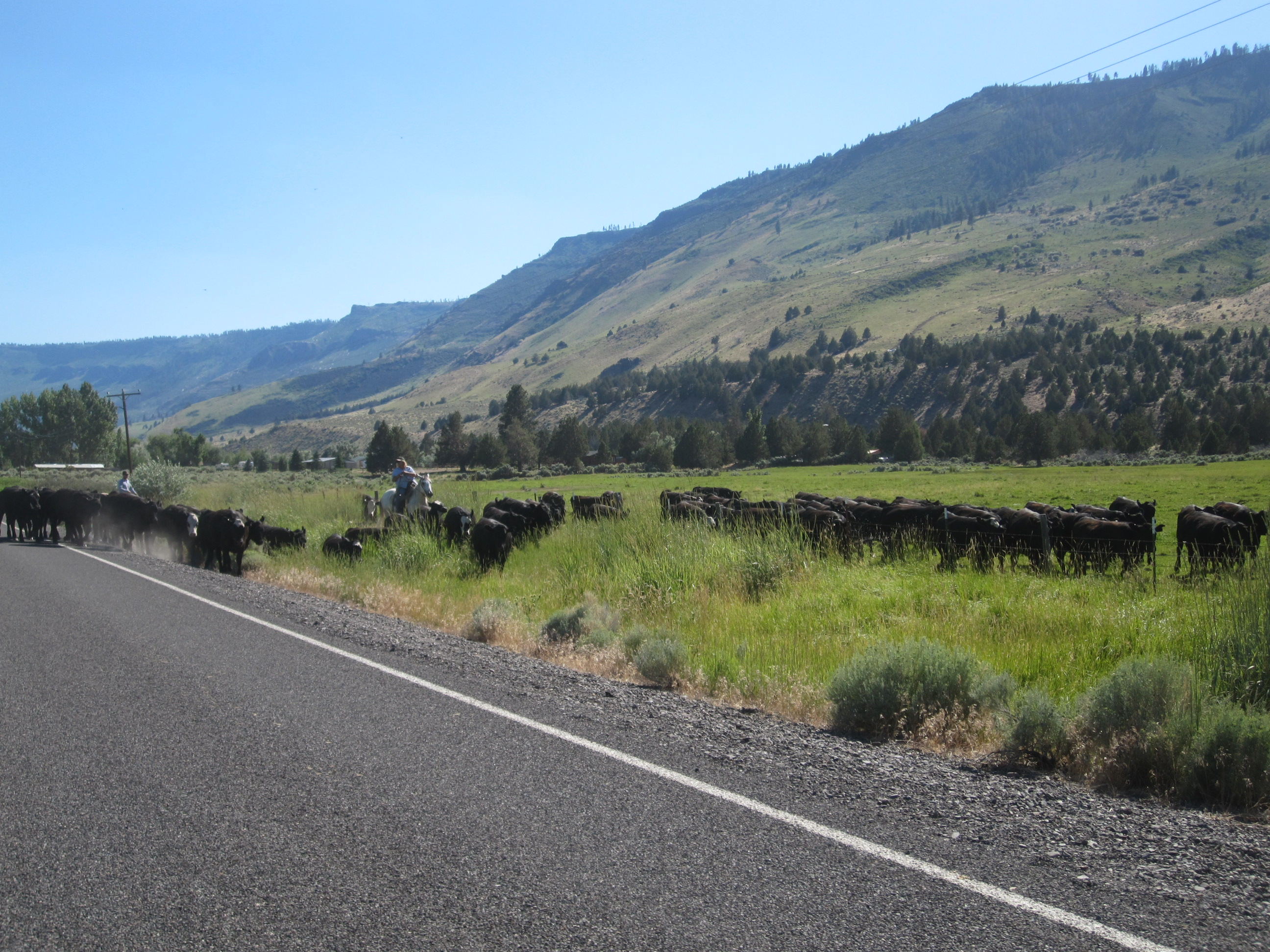
Cattle drive near Summer Lake

Facilities in Summer Lake include a post office, gas station, store, motel, restaurants, and several bed and breakfast establishments. An art and science residency program, Playa, is located 12.4 miles south on Oregon Highway 31.

== Parks and recreation ==
There is a wayside park located across the highway from the post office and store that has six interpretive markers highlighting the Frémont Expedition's travel through the Summer Lake basin, the geology of the Summer Lake region, and Oregon's Outback Scenic Byway.

== Museums and sites of interest ==
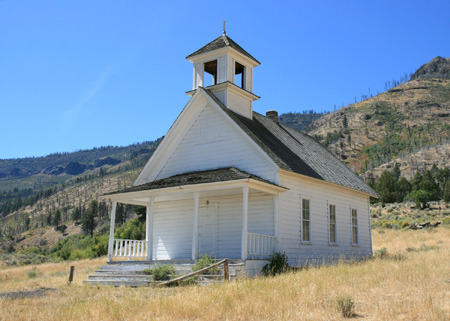
One-room Harris school built in 1890

Summer Lake is home to the well-preserved nineteenth-century Harris School, a one-room schoolhouse built in 1890 by the Harris family, who were among the first pioneer families to settle in the Summer Lake area. The school closed in 1919, and then briefly reopened in 1926 for three more years. In 1929, Summer Lake students began attending school in Paisley twenty miles (32 km) south of Summer Lake.

=== Wildlife refuge ===
The Summer Lake Basin supports more than 250 species of birds including bald eagles, Canada geese, white faced ibis, yellow-headed blackbirds, goshawks, hermit thrushes, red-tail hawks, great blue herons, and numerous species of ducks. This makes Summer Lake a favorite bird watching and hunting area.

The Oregon Department of Fish and Wildlife maintains the Summer Lake Wildlife Area on the north side of the lake. The refuge consists of a large wetland marsh fed by the Ana River and associated high desert uplands with an 8.3-mile (13.4 km) tour route open to the public most of the year.

The refuge headquarters and several housing units are located adjacent to Oregon Route 31 at the south end of the town. The Department of Fish and Wildlife operation and the visitors who come to the refuge are an important part of the Summer Lake economy.

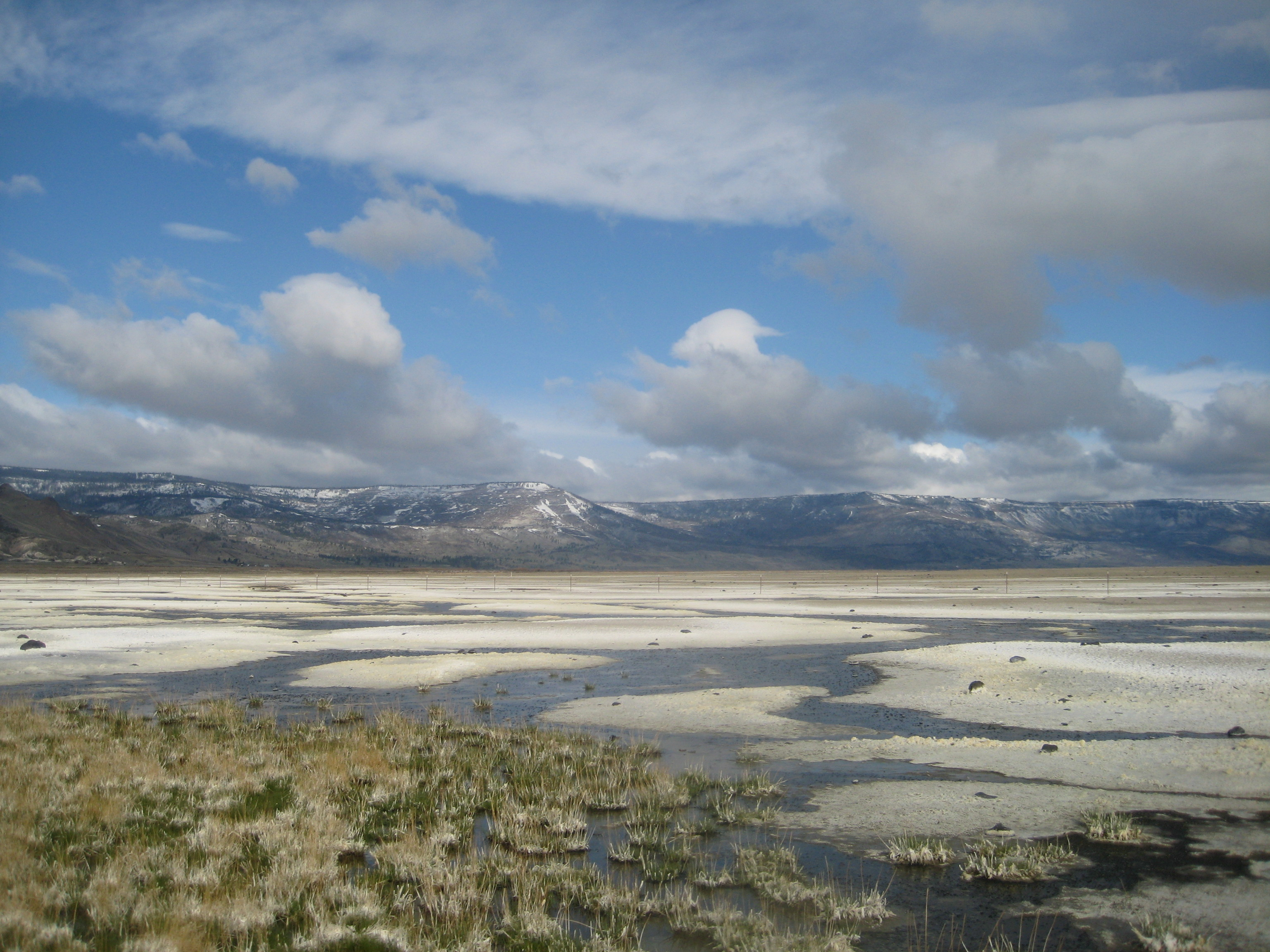
*Summer Lake

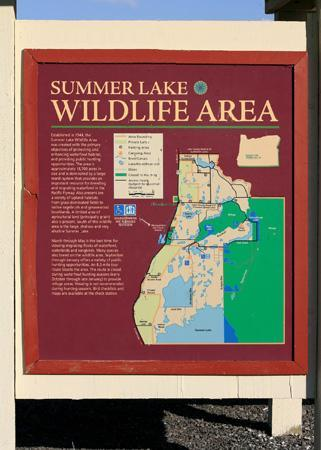
*Refuge sign

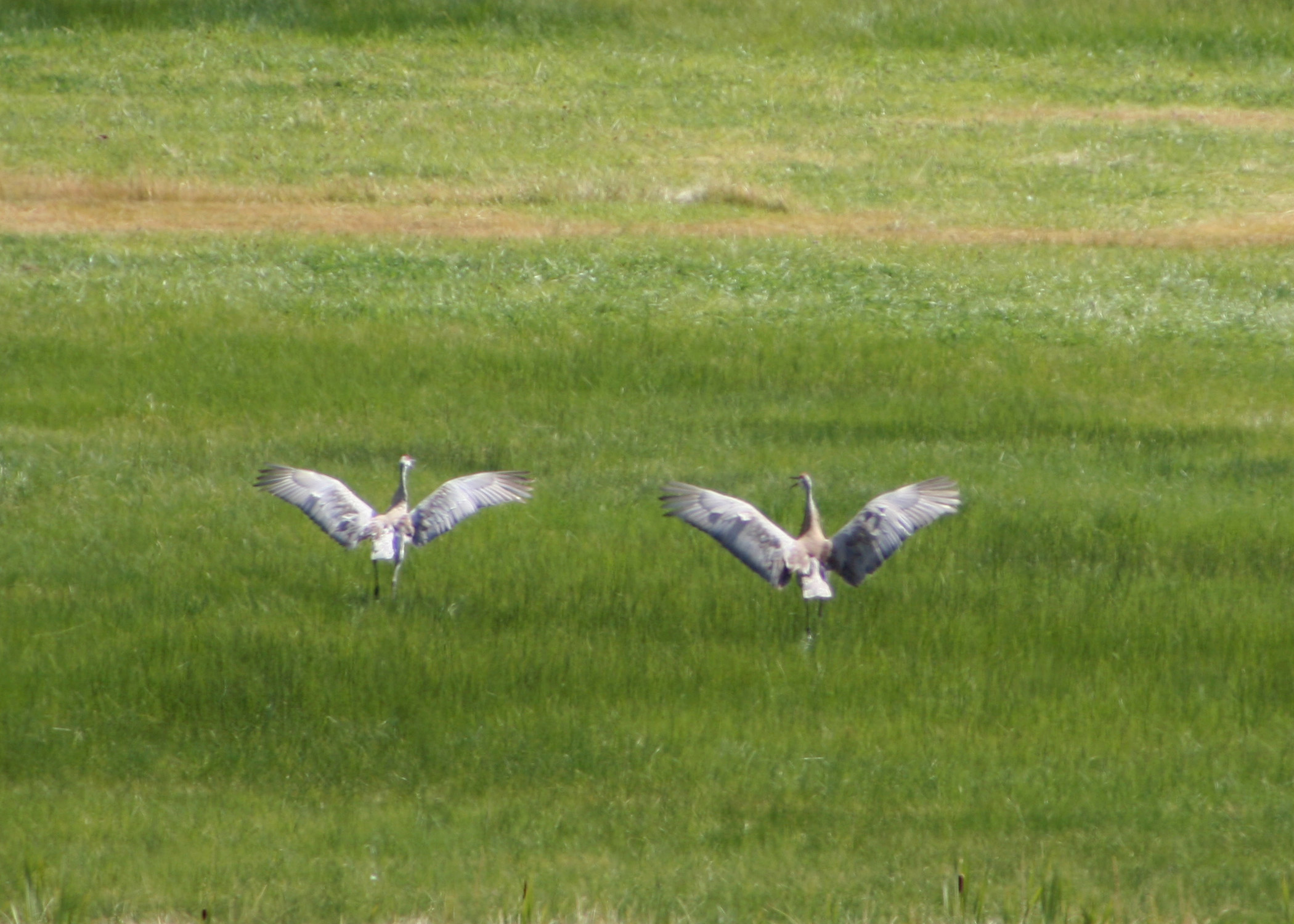
*Sandhill cranes

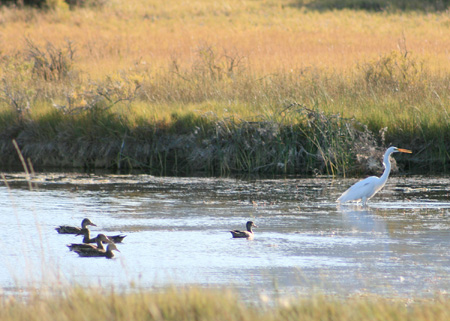
*Ducks and egret
