= Oregon Route 31 =

State highway in central Oregon, US

Oregon Route 31
- Route 31 highlighted in red

Route information
- Maintained by ODOT
- Length: 120.57 mi (194.04 km)
- Existed: 1932–present
- Component highways: Fremont Highway No. 19

Major junctions
- South end: US 395 in Valley Falls
- North end: US 97 near La Pine

Location
- Country: United States
- State: Oregon
- Counties: Lake, Klamath, Deschutes

Highway system
- Oregon Highways; Interstate; US; State; Named; Scenic
← US 30	→ OR 34

Oregon Route 31 is a state highway in the U.S. state of Oregon that runs between the Central Oregon cities of La Pine and Lakeview. OR 31 traverses most of the Fremont Highway No. 19 of the Oregon state highway system, named after John C. Frémont. The entire length of OR 31 is part of the Outback Scenic Byway, though the byway extends further south beyond the end of OR 31, to the California border.

== Route description ==
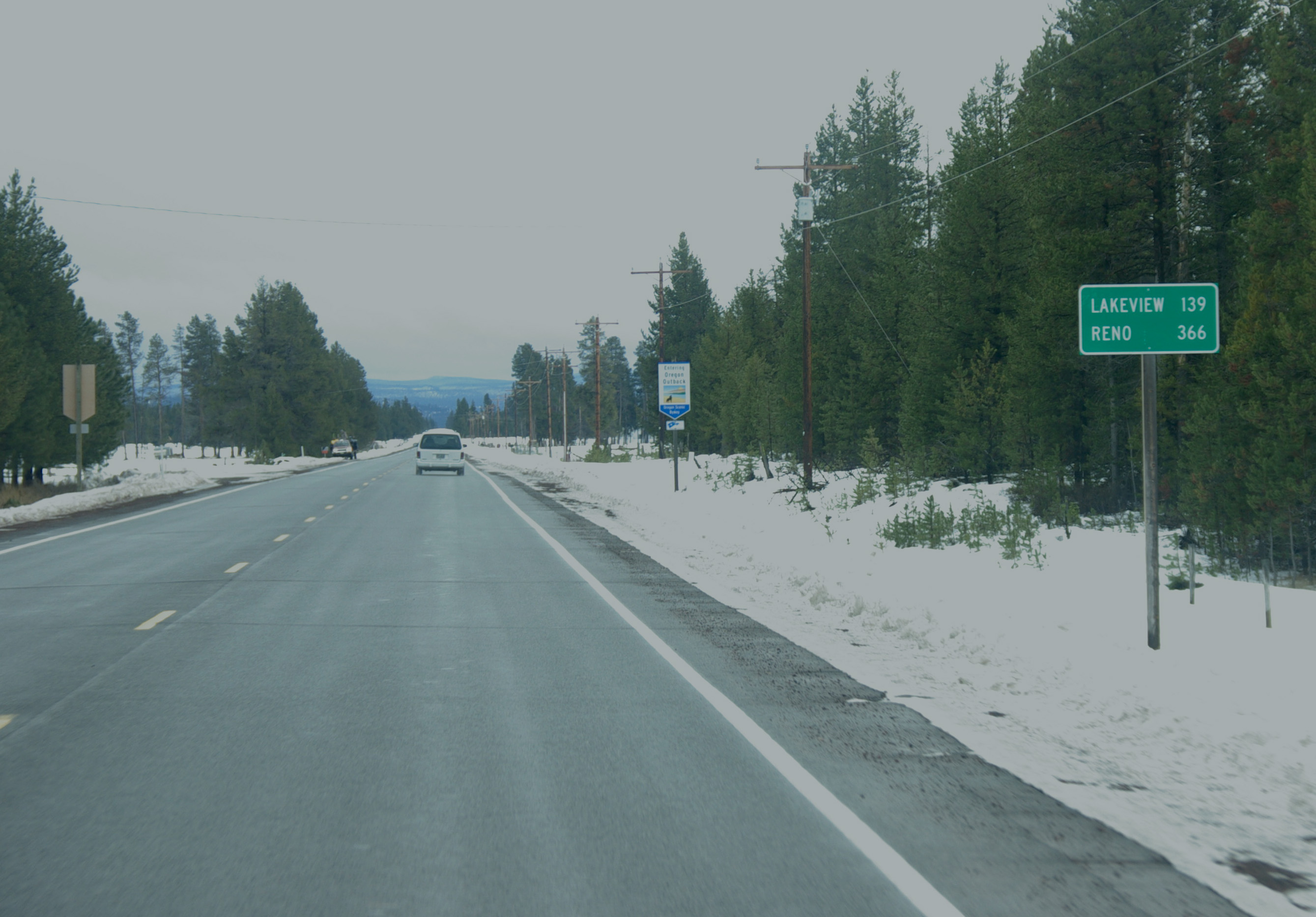
Northern terminus of OR 31 looking south

Oregon 31 runs northwest-southeast, but is signed north–south. It is a two-lane rural road for its entire length. The northern terminus of the highway is at an intersection with U.S. Route 97 south of the city of La Pine. From there, the highway heads southeast, passing near the natural attractions of Big Hole, Hole-in-the-Ground, and Fort Rock State Natural Area. The route turns briefly east, passing by Paulina Marsh and Silver Lake and through the community of Silver Lake; it then turns south, goes over Picture Rock Pass, and passes by the Summer Lake Wildlife Area, then through the community of Summer Lake and by the lake of the same name. The road then runs east near the south shore of Summer Lake, then southeast through Paisley. Near the southern end of Abert Lake, and north of Lakeview, the highway ends at an intersection with U.S. Route 395.

A previous routing from a 1916 map shows the highway's northern terminus near Millican on U.S. 20, proceeding down Forest Road 25, then down Forest Road 18/Cabin Lake Road to the community of Fort Rock and continuing south on Pitcher Lane and Picture Lane to Silver Lake.

== Major intersections ==
Milepoints are as reported by ODOT and do not necessarily reflect current mileage. Z indicates overlapping mileage due to construction longer than established route, and – indicates negative mileage behind established beginning point. Segments that are locally maintained may be omitted. For routes traversing multiple named state highways, each milepoint is preceded by the corresponding state highway number.

County	Location	Milepoint	Destinations	Notes
Lake	Valley Falls	120.57	US 395 south – Lakeview, Reno US 395 north – Wagontire, Burns	Southern terminus
Lake		116.50	Chewaucan River	
Lake		109.27	Chewaucan River	
Lake	Paisley	98.22	Chewaucan River	
Lake		79.47	Hunter Hill Summit, elevation 4,205 feet (1,282 m)	
Lake	Summer Lake	69.12	Fremont Memorial historical marker	
Lake	Summer Lake	69.09	Summer Lake Safety Rest Area	
Lake		62.95	Picture Rock Pass Summit, elevation 4,830 feet (1,470 m)	
Lake	Fort Rock Junction	28.97	Fort Rock historical marker	
Klamath	No major junctions			
Deschutes		0.00	US 97 – Crescent, Klamath Falls, La Pine, Bend	Northern terminus
1.000 mi = 1.609 km; 1.000 km = 0.621 mi
