= Paisley, Oregon =

- City
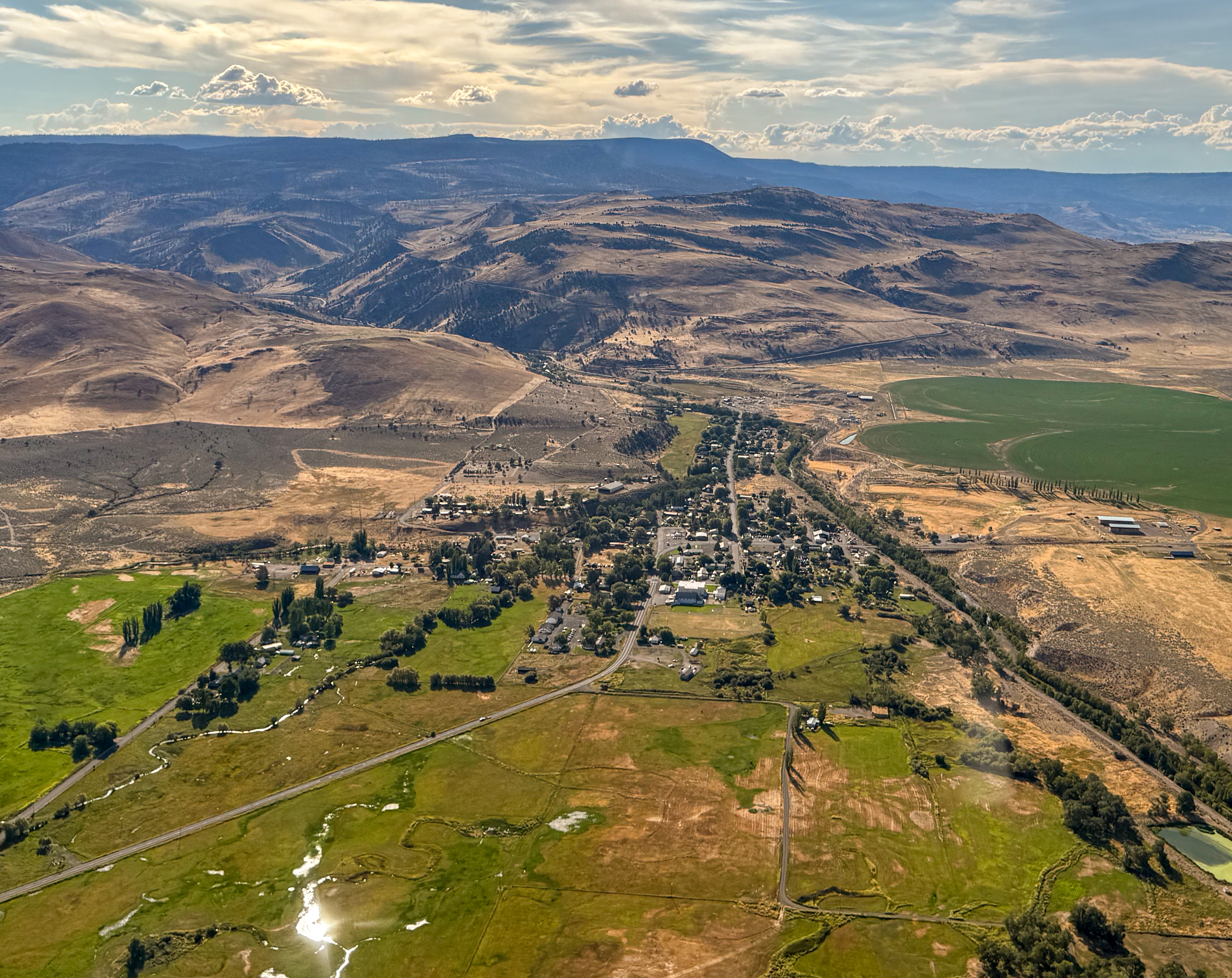
- Aerial view of Paisley, 2025
- Motto: Home of the Mosquito Festival
- Location in Oregon
- Coordinates: 42°41′33″N 120°32′44″W
- Country: United States
- State: Oregon
- County: Lake
- Incorporated: 1911

Government
  - Mayor: Keith Harra as of 2025

Area
  - Total: 0.42 sq mi (1.09 km^{2})
  - Land: 0.42 sq mi (1.09 km^{2})
  - Water: 0 sq mi (0.00 km^{2})
- Elevation: 4,374 ft (1,333 m)

Population (2020)
  - Total: 250
  - Density: 595.7/sq mi (229.99/km^{2})
- Time zone: UTC-8 (Pacific)
  - Summer (DST): UTC-7 (Pacific)
- ZIP code: 97636
- Area code: 541
- FIPS code: 41-56250
- GNIS feature ID: 2411353
- Website: cityofpaisley.net

Paisley is a city in Lake County, Oregon, United States. It is along Oregon Route 31 between Summer Lake and Lake Abert. The population was 250 at the 2020 census.

== History ==
There are two theories regarding the origin of the name "Paisley". One story says that Charles Mitchell Innes, from Scotland, named the place for Paisley in his home country, in about 1873. Another informant stated that the place was named by Samuel G. Steele, also a native of Scotland. Steele was the first postmaster of the Paisley post office, which was established in 1879. The city was incorporated on November 18, 1911, and is one of only two cities in the county.

Archeological sites from the 1930s at Paisley Caves and 1966 at Fort Rock give the oldest known evidence for early Native Americans. Radiocarbon dating of coprolites indicate they are from 12,750 to 14,290 years before the present.

== Arts and culture ==
Paisley is home to an annual Mosquito Festival that raises funds for vector control. The festival is held the last full weekend of July.

Paisley is also home to the Paisley Players Community Theater, a non-profit organization with a board of directors. The group stages a play each year in the spring, either at the Community Center or the Paisley School Auditorium.

== Geography ==
Paisley is located at an elevation of 4,374 feet (1,333 m). According to the United States Census Bureau, the city has a total area of 0.44 square miles (1.14 km^{2}), all of it land. The Chewaucan River flows through the city.

=== Geothermal energy ===
Paisley sits on top of a supply of hot groundwater. In 1980 on the Colahan Ranch in Paisley, a well was unintentionally drilled into a fault, revealing the hot water. After using the water for irrigation for a time, the Colahans invited the local electricity cooperative to investigate the well's use as a geothermal energy source in 2008. The plant was expected to come online in 2013 with a projected energy output of three megawatts using grants from both Federal and State governments for up to seven million dollars. However, by July 2015 the plant had still not come online, and the costs had expanded from a projected twelve million dollars to more than twenty one million dollars, while the amount gained through government grants had fallen to only five million. The plant became operational later that year at a projected 3.1 megawatts capability. The plant was able to generate an estimated 4,129,6800 kilowatt hours of energy over the eight months it was operational during 2016 with a peak output of 2,100 kilowatts.

=== Climate ===
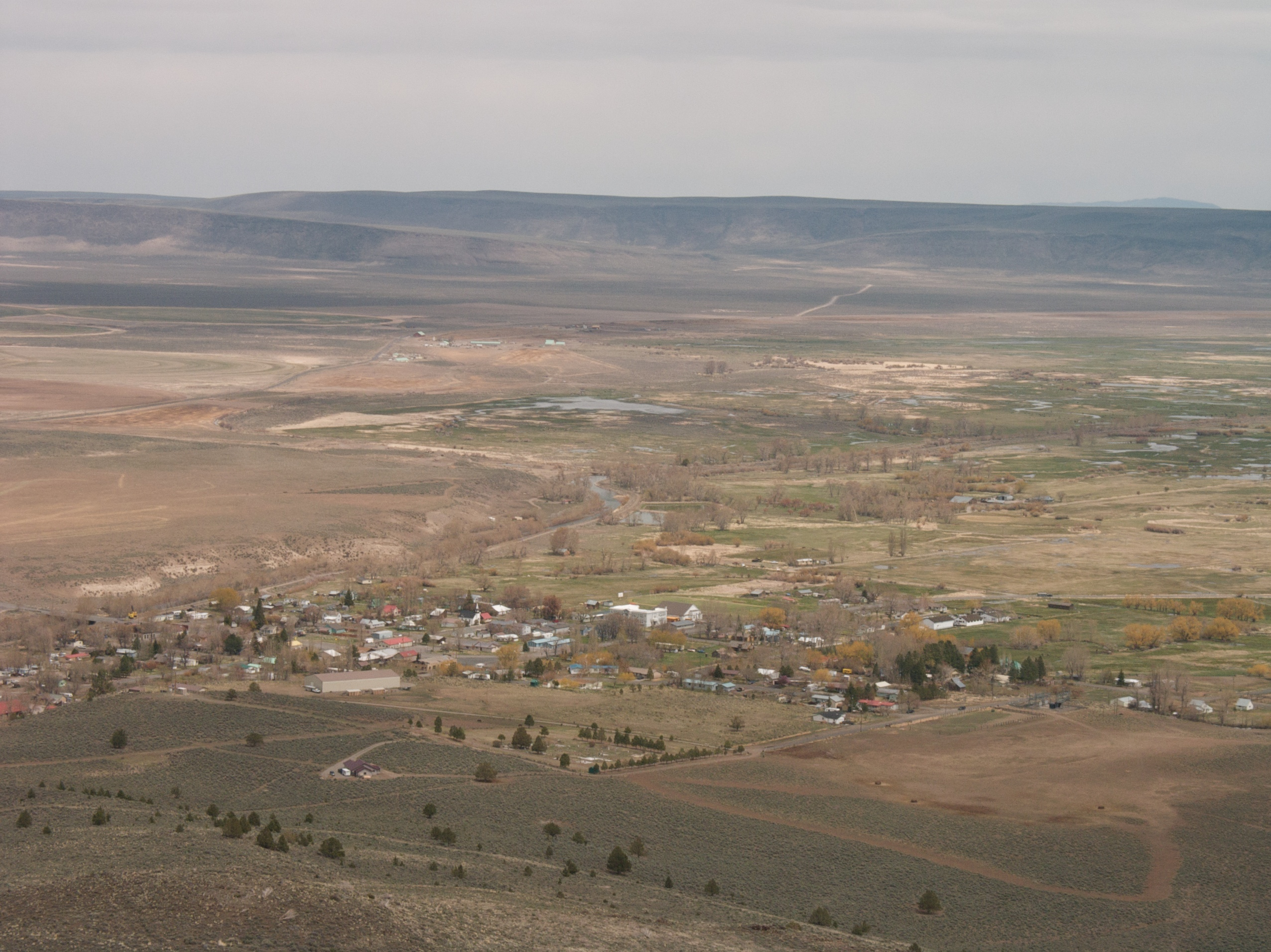
Aerial view of Paisley, 2008

According to the Köppen Climate Classification system, Paisley has a steppe climate, abbreviated "BSk" on climate maps.

Climate data for Paisley
Month	Jan	Feb	Mar	Apr	May	Jun	Jul	Aug	Sep	Oct	Nov	Dec	Year
Record high °F (°C)	65 (18)	72 (22)	79 (26)	85 (29)	93 (34)	101 (38)	113 (45)	103 (39)	101 (38)	94 (34)	82 (28)	70 (21)	113 (45)
Mean daily maximum °F (°C)	41 (5)	45.6 (7.6)	51.7 (10.9)	59.2 (15.1)	67.4 (19.7)	75.2 (24.0)	85.3 (29.6)	84.2 (29.0)	75.9 (24.4)	64.8 (18.2)	49.8 (9.9)	41.9 (5.5)	61.8 (16.6)
Mean daily minimum °F (°C)	21.7 (−5.7)	25.1 (−3.8)	28.1 (−2.2)	32.5 (0.3)	38.4 (3.6)	44.4 (6.9)	50.2 (10.1)	48.5 (9.2)	41.8 (5.4)	34.2 (1.2)	27.1 (−2.7)	22.4 (−5.3)	34.5 (1.4)
Record low °F (°C)	−29 (−34)	−25 (−32)	−6 (−21)	8 (−13)	10 (−12)	20 (−7)	27 (−3)	21 (−6)	17 (−8)	0 (−18)	−8 (−22)	−28 (−33)	−29 (−34)
Average precipitation inches (mm)	1.17 (30)	0.91 (23)	0.89 (23)	0.8 (20)	1.04 (26)	1.04 (26)	0.43 (11)	0.4 (10)	0.51 (13)	0.71 (18)	1.07 (27)	1.16 (29)	10.12 (257)
Average snowfall inches (cm)	4.5 (11)	3.3 (8.4)	3.4 (8.6)	1.6 (4.1)	0.5 (1.3)	0 (0)	0 (0)	0 (0)	0 (0)	0.2 (0.51)	1.6 (4.1)	3.1 (7.9)	18.3 (46)
Average precipitation days	7	6	6	6	6	5	2	2	3	4	6	6	59
Source: Western Regional Climate Center

== Demographics ==
Historical population
Census	Pop.	Note	%±
1880	89		—
1890	69		−22.5%
1900	176		155.1%
1910	176		0.0%
1920	257		46.0%
1930	259		0.8%
1940	237		−8.5%
1950	214		−9.7%
1960	219		2.3%
1970	260		18.7%
1980	343		31.9%
1990	350		2.0%
2000	247		−29.4%
2010	243		−1.6%
2020	250		2.9%

=== 2020 census ===
As of the 2020 census, Paisley had a population of 250. The median age was 51.6 years. 19.2% of residents were under the age of 18 and 33.2% of residents were 65 years of age or older. For every 100 females there were 101.6 males, and for every 100 females age 18 and over there were 106.1 males age 18 and over.

0% of residents lived in urban areas, while 100.0% lived in rural areas.

There were 102 households in Paisley, of which 24.5% had children under the age of 18 living in them. Of all households, 42.2% were married-couple households, 18.6% were households with a male householder and no spouse or partner present, and 35.3% were households with a female householder and no spouse or partner present. About 31.3% of all households were made up of individuals and 14.7% had someone living alone who was 65 years of age or older.

There were 134 housing units, of which 23.9% were vacant. Among occupied housing units, 63.7% were owner-occupied and 36.3% were renter-occupied. The homeowner vacancy rate was 1.5% and the rental vacancy rate was 16.7%.

Racial composition as of the 2020 census
Race	Number	Percent
White	225	90.0%
Black or African American	0	0%
American Indian and Alaska Native	3	1.2%
Asian	0	0%
Native Hawaiian and Other Pacific Islander	0	0%
Some other race	3	1.2%
Two or more races	19	7.6%
Hispanic or Latino (of any race)	12	4.8%

=== 2010 census ===
As of the census of 2010, there were 243 people, 125 households, and 67 families residing in the city. The population density was 552.3 inhabitants per square mile (213.2/km^{2}). There were 156 housing units at an average density of 354.5 per square mile (136.9/km^{2}). The racial makeup of the city was 93.8% White, 2.1% African American, 1.2% Native American, 0.8% Asian, and 2.1% from two or more races. Hispanic or Latino of any race were 1.6% of the population.

There were 125 households, of which 25.6% had children under the age of 18 living with them, 44.8% were married couples living together, 4.8% had a female householder with no husband present, 4.0% had a male householder with no wife present, and 46.4% were non-families. 39.2% of all households were made up of individuals, and 20% had someone living alone who was 65 years of age or older. The average household size was 1.94 and the average family size was 2.58.

The median age in the city was 53.6 years. 17.7% of residents were under the age of 18; 4.1% were between the ages of 18 and 24; 18.1% were from 25 to 44; 33.8% were from 45 to 64; and 26.3% were 65 years of age or older. The gender makeup of the city was 48.1% male and 51.9% female.

=== 2000 census ===
As of the census of 2000, there were 247 people, 115 households, and 80 families residing in the city. The population density was 556.3 inhabitants per square mile (214.8/km^{2}). There were 176 housing units at an average density of 396.4 per square mile (153.1/km^{2}). The racial makeup of the city was 97.98% White, 0.81% Native American, 0.40% Asian, 0.81% from other races. Hispanic or Latino of any race were 1.21% of the population.

There were 115 households, out of which 23.5% had children under the age of 18 living with them, 60.0% were married couples living together, 7.0% had a female householder with no husband present, and 29.6% were non-families. 26.1% of all households were made up of individuals, and 12.2% had someone living alone who was 65 years of age or older. The average household size was 2.15 and the average family size was 2.56.

In the city, the population was spread out, with 20.2% under the age of 18, 1.6% from 18 to 24, 20.2% from 25 to 44, 34.0% from 45 to 64, and 23.9% who were 65 years of age or older. The median age was 49 years. For every 100 females, there were 105.8 males. For every 100 females age 18 and over, there were 105.2 males.

The median income for a household in the city was $28,214, and the median income for a family was $30,625. Males had a median income of $21,250 versus $28,125 for females. The per capita income for the city was $16,224. About 13.0% of families and 16.9% of the population were below the poverty line, including 25.0% of those under the age of eighteen and 8.1% of those 65 or over.

== Education ==
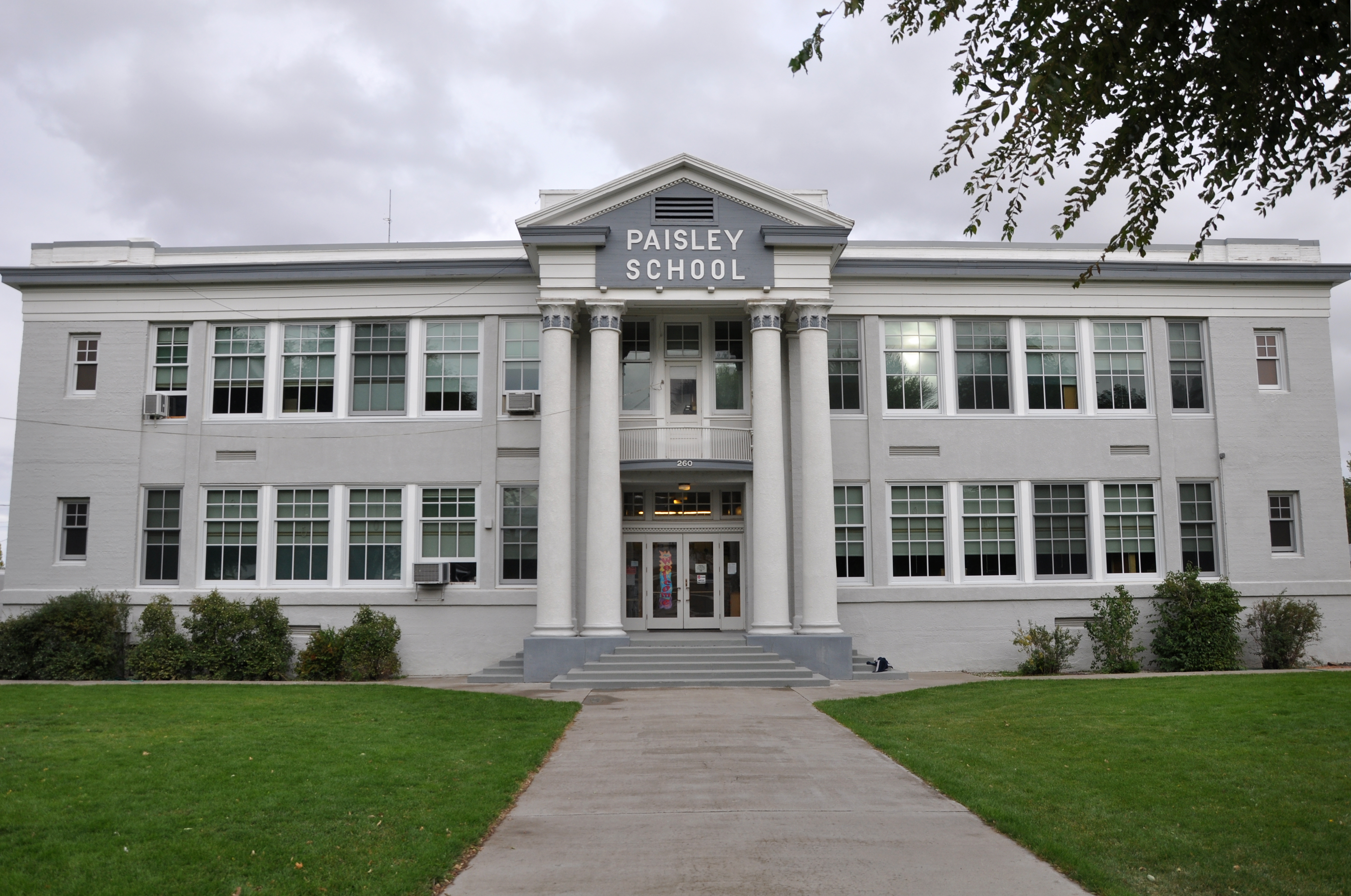
Paisley School

Paisley School, the only school in Paisley School District 11, enrolls students in kindergarten through grade 12.

The section of Lake County that Paisley is in is not a part of a community college district, but the county has a "contract-out-of-district" (COD) with Klamath Community College.

== Recreation ==
Recreational activities including hunting, fishing in the Chewaucan River, hiking in the nearby Fremont and Winema National Forests, hang gliding, rock hounding, and swimming in local lakes and hot springs. The Hart Mountain National Antelope Refuge, Goose Lake State Recreation Area, and a number of Oregon State Parks are within driving distance of Paisley as well. The Oregon Desert Trail passes through the town.

== Transportation ==
- Paisley Airport
