= Upland game bird =

Hunting terminology

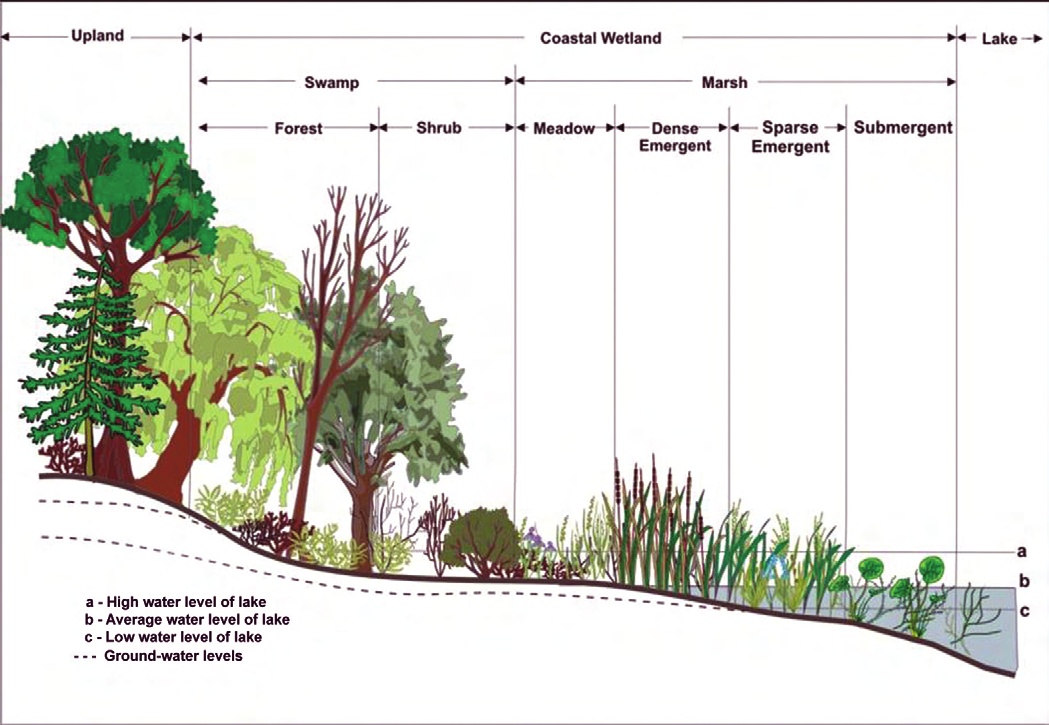
A diagram of a coastal marsh, comparing upland region, wetland, and lacustrine zones

Upland game bird is an American term which refers to non-waterfowl game birds in groundcover-rich terrestrial ecosystems above wetlands and riparian zones (i.e. "uplands"), which are commonly hunted with gun dogs (pointing breeds, flushing spaniels and retrievers).

== United States ==
As of 2013 the population of upland game birds such as pheasants had been falling in agricultural states such as Iowa where increased commodity prices for crops such as corn had resulted in reductions in game habitat in acreage set aside in the Conservation Reserve Program. A significant reduction in the number of hunters over the previous 20 years was also reported.

=== State laws ===
At least ten states have passed laws wherein there is a definition of "upland game" giving a list of species. These lists are not at all the same, and some of them contain non-avian species. These species may be listed by common name instead of by scientific name, which can make it difficult to determine from the laws alone what species they intend to protect. The following species appear on one or more state lists of "upland game."

=== List of game birds ===
- American Crow
- Band-Tailed Pigeon
- Blue Grouse
- Chukar Partridge
- Dove
- Dusky Grouse
- Eurasian Collared-Dove
- Gray Partridge
- Greater Sage-Grouse
- Grouse
- Hungarian Partridge
- Mourning Dove
- Partridge
- Pheasant
- Pigeon
- Ptarmigan
- Quail
- Ruffed Grouse
- Sage Grouse
- Sandhill Crane
- Sharp-tailed grouse
- Turkey
- White-tailed ptarmigan
- Wild Turkey
- Woodcock

=== List of non-avian upland game ===
- Cottontail rabbit
- Eastern Cottontail Rabbit
- Fox
- Hare
- Opossum
- Prairie Dog
- Rabbit
- Rock Chuck
- Snowshoe Hare
- Tree Squirrel
