= Summer Lake (Oregon) =

Alkali lake in Lake County, Oregon

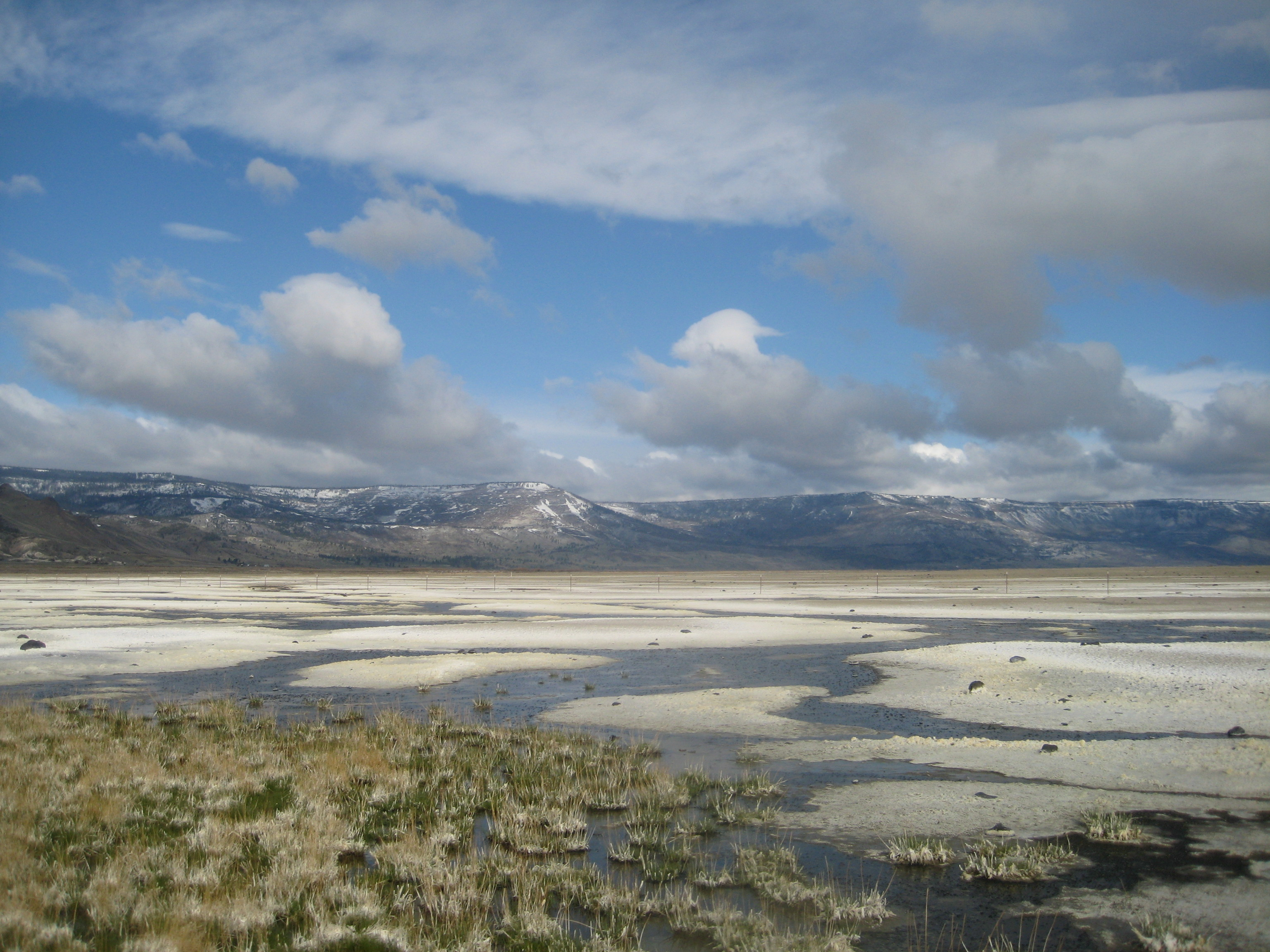
- Summer Lake

- Location within Oregon
- Location: Lake County, Oregon, United States
- Coordinates: 42.83°N 120.75°W
- Type: Natural, endorheic, hypereutrophic
- Primary inflows: Ana River
- Primary outflows: Evaporation
- Catchment area: 376 square miles (970 km^{2})
- Basin countries: United States
- Max. length: 15 miles (24 km)
- Max. width: 5 miles (8 km)
- Surface area: 25,000 acres (10,000 ha)
- Average depth: 1 foot (0.30 m)
- Max. depth: 5 feet (1.5 m)
- Water volume: 25,000 acre-feet (31,000,000 m^{3})
- Residence time: 3.5 years
- Shore length^{1}: 35 miles (56 km)
- Surface elevation: 4,150 feet (1,260 m)
- Settlements: Summer Lake, Paisley
- ^{1} Shore length is not a well-defined measure.

Summer Lake is a large, shallow, alkali lake in Lake County, Oregon, United States located 5 miles (8 km) south of the small, unincorporated community of Summer Lake, Oregon. At high water it is about 15 miles (24 km) long and 5 miles (8 km) wide, and supports a wide variety of birds and other wildlife in its marshes. The lake was named by explorer John C. Frémont on his expedition into Central Oregon in 1843.

== Ancient Lake Chewaucan ==
The arid lands around Summer Lake were once lush. During the Pleistocene Epoch, vast areas of this region of south central Oregon were covered by lakes and wetlands. As the last ice age was ending, rain and runoff from melting snow filled the lowlands throughout this region of the Great Basin, creating an immense, freshwater lake called Lake Chewaucan. The lake covered 461 square miles (1,190 km^{2}) at depths of up to 375 feet (114 m).

Lake Chewaucan covered the Summer Lake basin and drainage system much of the late Pleistocene. The last high water period is thought to have occurred about 13,000 years ago. There is archaeological evidence of human use of Lake Chewaucan during this time. The oldest known human remains in the Western Hemisphere come from the Paisley Caves, wave-cut caves currently 10 miles southwest from Summer Lake. Lake Chewaucan began to dry up at the close of the Pleistocene. As it shrank, salts and alkali were concentrated in its remaining waters. The exposed lake bottom sediments were blown by the prevailing westerly winds to form the sand dunes that still lie on the east side of Summer Lake.

Today, Summer Lake and Abert Lake are separated by 20 miles (32 km) and are the only remnants of Lake Chewaucan. At high water, Summer Lake is about 15 miles (24 km) long and 5 miles (8 km) wide; however, water levels fluctuate dramatically, and sometimes the lake is almost dry in summer. The main source of fresh water is the small spring-fed Ana River, which is used for irrigation.

== Fremont expedition ==
Summer Lake was spotted and named by Captain John C. Frémont during his 1843 mapping expedition through central Oregon. Fremont and his Army topographical team were mapping the Oregon Territory from The Dalles on Columbia River to Sutter's Fort in Sacramento, California. On 16 December 1843, the expedition struggled down a steep cliff from a snow-covered plateau to reach a large lake in the valley below. Frémont named the snow-covered rim "Winter Ridge" and the temperate waters "Summer Lake." Frémont described the discovery and naming of Summer Lake as follows:

At our feet...more than a thousand feet below...we looked into a green prairie country, in which a beautiful lake, some twenty miles in length, was spread along the foot of the mountain...Shivering on snow three feet deep, and stiffening in a cold north wind, we exclaimed at once that the names of summer lake and winter ridge should be applied to these proximate places of such sudden and violent contrast.

— John C. Fremont, 16 December 1843, Report, Second Expedition

== Wildlife refuge ==
The Summer Lake Basin supports more than 250 species of birds including bald eagles, Canada geese, white faced ibis, yellow-headed blackbirds, goshawks, hermit thrushes, red-tail hawks, great blue herons, and numerous species of ducks. This makes Summer Lake a favorite bird watching and hunting area.

The Oregon Department of Fish and Wildlife maintains the Summer Lake Wildlife Area on the north side of the lake. The refuge consists of a large wetland marsh fed by the Ana River with associated high desert uplands with an 8.3-mile (13.4 km) tour route open to the public most of the year. The refuge headquarters is located adjacent to Oregon Route 31 in the town of Summer Lake, directly across from the Summer Lake Lodge.

== Dust storm ==
Plumes of Summer Lake dust, lifted by winds of up to 60 miles per hour (97 km/h), are thought to be responsible for "dirty rain" that fell on February 6, 2015, across parts of three U.S. states: Oregon, Washington, and Idaho. Scientists at Washington State University concluded that an unusual combination of weather systems carried the dust up to 500 miles (800 km) north and northeast, where it mixed with rain, which turned "milky". Chalky residue coated cars and windows in Hermiston, Spokane, and at least 13 other cities.

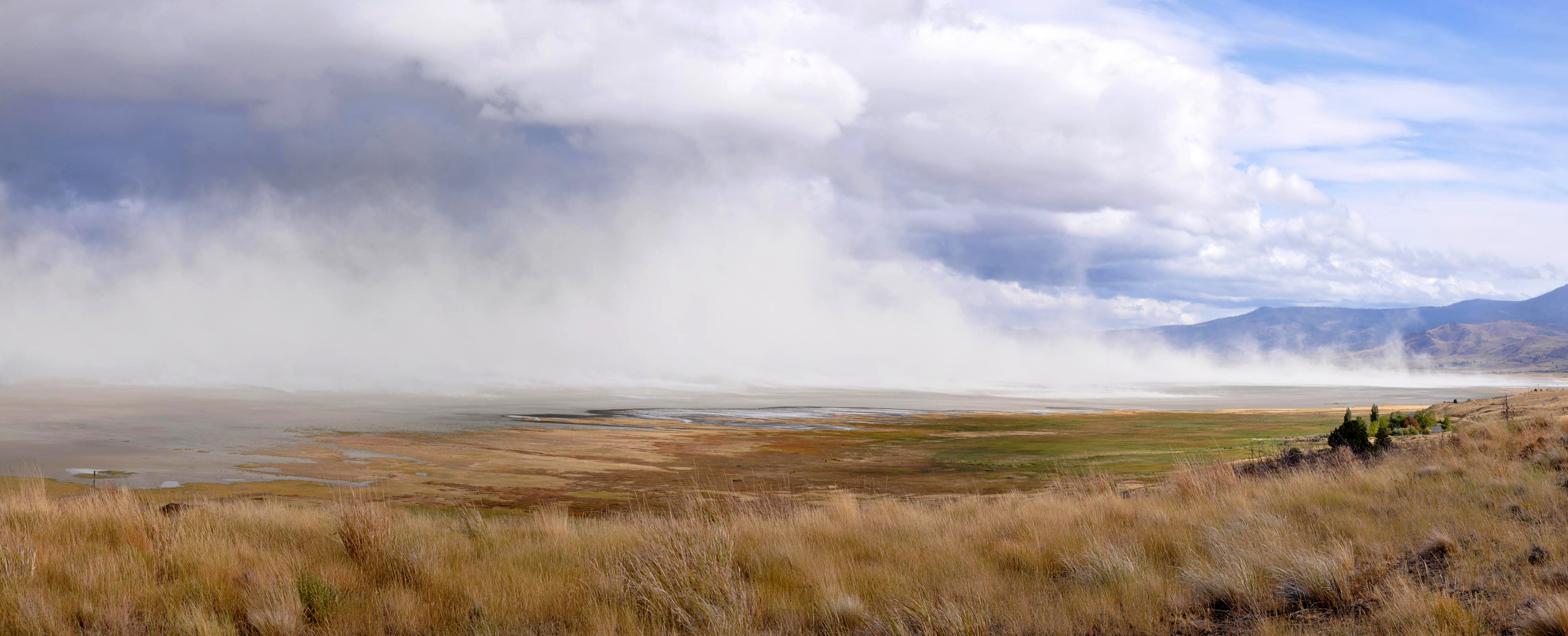
Dust clouds rise above Summer Lake during a September storm in 2013. View is to the southeast. Part of Winter Ridge is visible on the right.

== See also ==
- Fremont-Winema National Forests
- List of lakes in Oregon
