= Silver Lake (Oregon) =

Lake in Oregon, United States

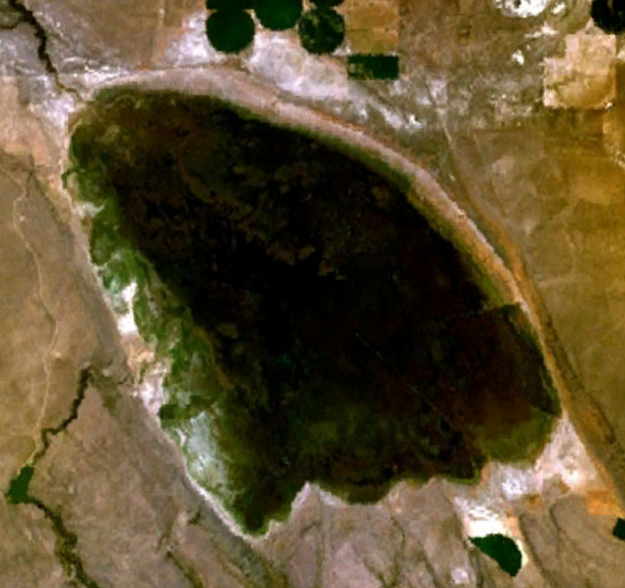
- Satellite image of Silver Lake

- Location within Oregon Location within the United States
- Location: Lake County, Oregon
- Coordinates: 43°05′46″N 120°53′17″W
- Basin countries: United States
- Surface area: 10,451 acres (4,229 ha)
- Shore length^{1}: 22.5 miles (36.2 km)
- Surface elevation: 4,324 feet (1,318 m)
- ^{1} Shore length is not a well-defined measure.

Silver Lake is an intermittent high-desert lake in Lake County, Oregon, United States. It is 6 miles (10 km) east of the community of Silver Lake. It is unknown who first gave the lake its descriptive name. Central Oregon residents attribute it to John C. Frémont, although no proof has been found, and he would not have seen the lake on his first visit to Oregon in 1843. The Klamath called the lake Kalpshi, which may have been derived from the word kalapsh, meaning a decayed log. The name was used because of the petrified wood near the lake.

== See also ==
- List of lakes in Oregon
