= Goose Lake Valley =

Valley in south-central Oregon and northeastern California

Coordinates: 41.6°N 120.4°W

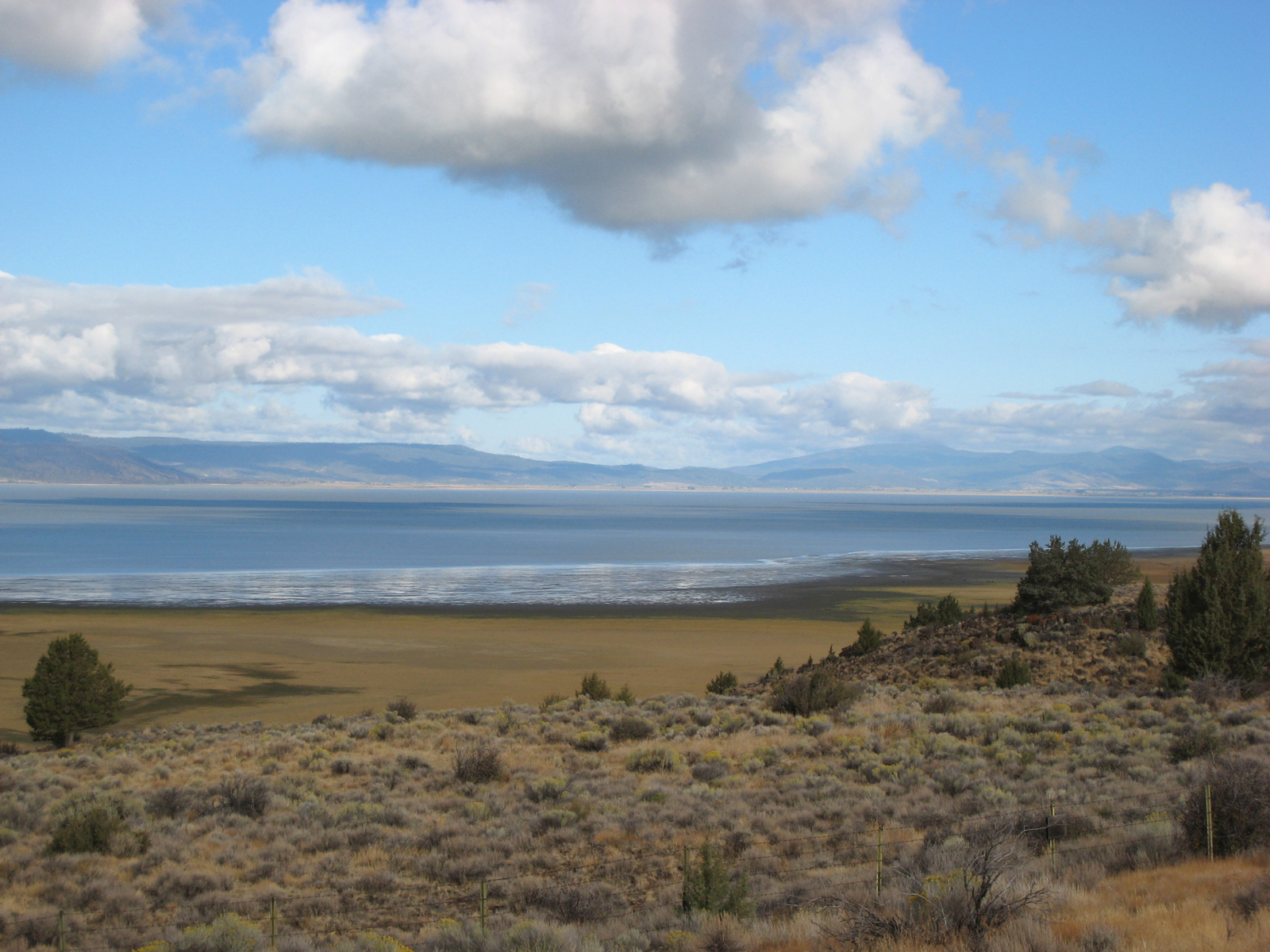
- Goose Lake near the Oregon–California border

- Location within California
- Length: 47 mi (76 km) north–south
- Width: 12 mi (19 km) west–east

Geography
- Country: United States
- State: Oregon and California
- Counties: Lake County, Oregon; Modoc County, California
- Population center: Lakeview, Oregon
- Borders on: Fremont Mountains; Warner Mountains; Modoc Plateau
- Interactive map of Goose Lake Valley

The Goose Lake Valley is located in south-central Oregon and northeastern California in the United States. It is a high valley at the northwestern corner of North America's Great Basin. Much of the valley floor is covered by Goose Lake, a large endorheic lake that straddles the Oregon–California border. Native Americans inhabited the Goose Lake Valley for thousands of years before explorers arrived in the 19th century. The pioneer wagon route known as the Applegate Trail crossed the Goose Lake Valley on its way to southern Oregon. At the south end of Goose Lake, the Lassen Cutoff separated from the Applegate Trail and headed south toward the Sacramento Valley. Today, Lakeview, Oregon, is the largest settlement in the valley. Livestock ranching and lumber mills are the valley's main commercial activity. The Goose Lake Valley offers a number of recreational opportunities including hang-gliding, hunting, fishing, and birdwatching.

== Geography ==
The Goose Lake Valley is located in Lake County in south-central Oregon and Modoc County in northeastern California. It is approximately 47 miles (76 kilometers) long and 12 miles (19 km) wide.

The largest settlement in the Goose Lake Valley is Lakeview. There are two main highways that pass through the valley, and both pass through Lakeview. U.S. Route 395 runs north–south through the valley while Oregon Route 140 crosses the valley east–west. Klamath Falls, Oregon, is 97 miles (156 km) west of Lakeview on Route 140. Winnemucca, Nevada, is on Route 140, 212 miles (341 km) east of Lakeview. Bend, Oregon, is 176 miles (283 km) northwest of Lakeview via Route 395, Oregon Route 31, and U.S. Route 97. Burns, Oregon, is 140 miles (230 km) northeast of Lakeview on Route 395 while Alturas, California, is 54 miles (87 km) south of Lakeview on the same highway.

Three sides of the valley are bordered by mountains that rise several thousand feet above the valley floor. On the east side, the Warner Mountains run the entire length of the valley, while the Fremont Mountains border the valley's north and west sides. At the northern end of the valley between the two mountain ranges is a low pass connecting the Goose Lake Valley with the Crooked Creek Valley, a small basin-and-range valley that leads to the south shore of Abert Lake. South and southwest of the Goose Lake Valley is the Modoc Plateau. Crane Mountain Oregon, in the Warner Mountains, is the highest point overlooking the valley. The summit of Crane Mountain is 8,456 feet (2,577 meters) above sea level.

The valley floor averages to about 4,900 feet (1,500 m) above sea level. It is dominated by Goose Lake, a large mildly-alkali lake. The surface elevation of the lake is 4,705 feet (1,434 m) above sea level at normal water levels. The lake normally has no outlet; however, when the water level is extremely high, the south end of the lake can overflow into the Pit River. During severe and extended drought periods, the lake has gone completely dry.

There are a number of streams that flow into the valley from the Fremont and Warner Mountains. The Fremont Mountains provide most of the fresh water delivered to Goose Lake. These northern and western slopes of the Goose Lake basin are drained by Thomas Creek, Muddy Creek, Cottonwood Creek, and Drews Creek. All flow into Goose Lake. At the southern end of the basin, Willow Creek and Lassen Creek flow from the Warner Mountains into Goose Lake.

== Geology ==
The area around the Goose Lake Valley was formed by faulted blocking. There are numerous bounding faults on the west and east side of the valley. The valley itself is an alluvial basin. Its underlying strata were formed by Pliocene and Pleistocene lava flows covered by Holocene sedimentary deposits. It is bounded by Pliocene and Tertiary basalt that form the Fremont and Warner Mountains, and on the south and southwest by Pliocene basalt of the Modoc Plateau.

In the Goose Lake area, volcanic rock from the Pliocene is up to 500 feet (150 m) thick. This is topped with additional layers of Pleistocene basalt up to 200 feet (61 m) thick. The upper levels of strata are sedimentary deposits from the Holocene, which are 1,000 feet (300 m) thick in some areas. The upper alluvial layers consist of partially stratified sand and silt mixed with layers of gravel. These deposits are permeable and provide the valley with groundwater. Calcium bicarbonate occurs in the groundwater throughout the basin.

The entire valley was once covered by a single vast pluvial lake that may have been 300 feet (91 m) deep during the Pleistocene epoch. However, during the Holocene epoch, water levels gradually receded, leaving a large endorheic lake. Today, the lake is known as Goose Lake and is only 24 feet (7.3 m) deep at its deepest point.

== Climate ==
The climate in the Goose Lake Valley is typical of the high desert country of south-central Oregon. It has warm summers and very cold winters. The valley gets an average of 14.3 inches (36 cm) of rain per year. It also gets an average of 53.6 inches (136 cm) of snow. The snowpack from the surrounding mountains feeds the streams that drain into the valley.

Spring is short, limiting the growing season to approximately 100 days. In the summer, days are generally warm and dry, but nights can be cool. High temperatures during the summer normally range from 75 to 90 °F (24 to 32 °C). Fall days tend to be clear and crisp with cold nights. Winters in the valley are quite cold, with daily temperatures averaging below freezing from December through February. Daily low temperatures can reach −20 °F (−29 °C) during the winter months.

== Ecology ==
The Goose Lake Valley provides a number of unique animal habitats. These include lakes, marshes, riparian areas, grasslands, sage steppes, dry forests, and mountain rimrocks. They range in elevation from 4,705 feet (1,434 m) above sea level along the shore of Goose Lake to over 8,456 feet (2,577 m) at the summit of Crane Mountain. Marsh grasses are common along the lake shore. Riparian habitats support stands of quaking aspen, alder, and willow. Big sagebrush, bitterbrush, bunchgrass, and fescue are typical ground cover in the steppe and grassland areas. Western juniper, ponderosa pine, lodgepole pine, and white fir dominate the dry forest areas. Wildflowers found in the Goose Lake Valley area include common yarrow, camas, larkspur, elephant-head flower, blazing star, and crane orchids.

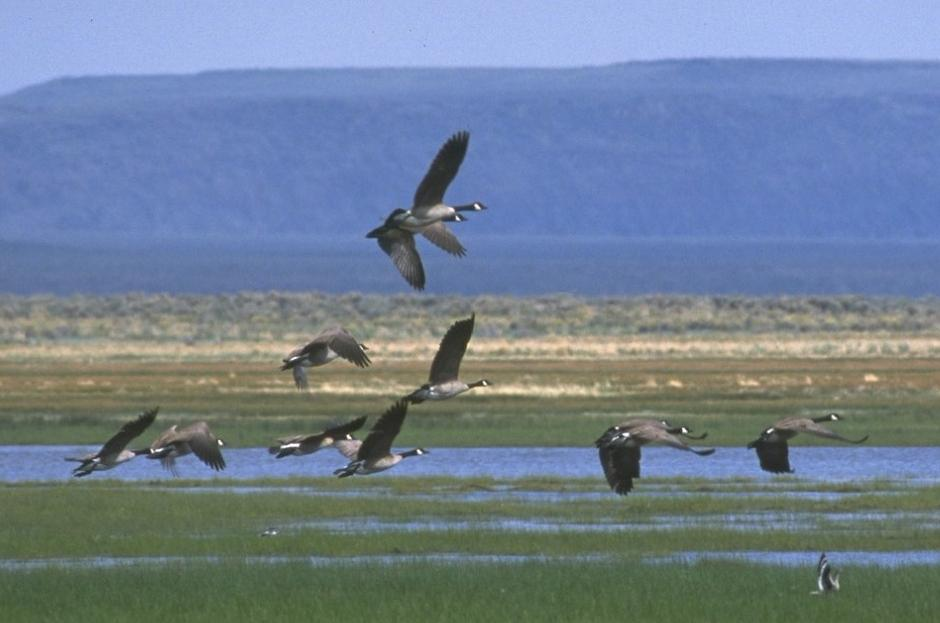
Canada geese taking off from wetland

The valley's wildlife includes common high desert mammal species. These include pronghorn, elk, mule deer, black bear, cougar, bobcat, and coyotes. Smaller mammals include jackrabbits, ground squirrels, and chipmunks.

The Goose Lake Valley is on the western flyway from Mexico to bird breeding grounds in the Arctic. During the spring, Canada geese, snow geese, Ross' geese, and whistling swans stops in the valley to feed and rest before continuing north. Numerous shorebirds also migrate through the valley. These include black-necked stilts, American avocets, spotted sandpipers, Wilson's phalaropes, red-necked phalaropes, black terns, eared grebes, horned grebes, and cinnamon teal. In the fall, these birds pass through the valley on their way south. In addition, a number of bird species nest in the areas around Goose Lake. Shorebirds such as American avocets, willets, killdeer, western grebe, and long-billed curlew nest near the lake. The wetlands north of the lake provide breeding areas for Canada geese and sandhill cranes as well as mallard and other duck species. The north shore wetlands are also an important breeding area for Clark's grebes, white-faced ibis, and great egret. Tundra swans and American white pelicans use the area as well. The lake supported a winter populations of over 10,000 Canada geese. Barrow's goldeneye and common goldeneye also winter in the area.

Most of the original marsh land around Goose Lake is now private property used for agriculture. This affects the lake environment. Cattle grazing near the edge of the lake has damaged the dry alkali crust, creating muddy areas around the freshwater streams that flow into the lake. During periods of drought, these muddy areas can almost encircle the lake, destroying islands that birds normally use as breeding habitat. Ranch hay product also affects the bird population. During the breeding season, hay harvesting can damage breeding habitat, destroy nests, and kill young chicks. The last large bulrush marsh in the Goose Lake Valley is just north of the lake. To preserve the area, United States Fish and Wildlife Service has been trying to purchase this property.

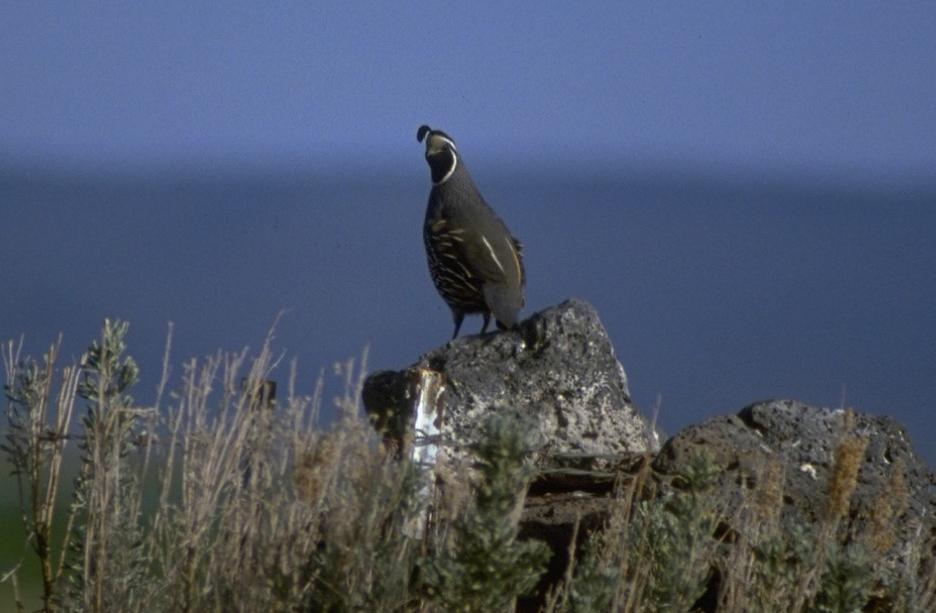
Quail are common in the Goose Lake Valley

In the canyon, riparian and rimrock areas around the valley, there are mountain chickadees, finches, Townsend's solitaires, lazuli bunting, warbling vireo, black-chinned hummingbirds, black-headed grosbeaks, Steller's jays, yellow-rumped warblers, Wilson's warblers, red-naped sapsuckers, MacGillivray's warblers, mountain bluebirds, Lewis's woodpeckers, and saw-whet owls. In the cottonwood and willow habitats of the open valley, there are Bullock's orioles, tree swallows, American goldfinch, and northern flicker as well as bluebirds, warblers, vireos, and sapsucker. There are also Caspian terns, forster's terns, marbled godwit, and spotted sandpipers in the fall. California quail are common year around throughout the valley. The valley's larger birds include Cooper's hawks and bald eagles. While peregrine falcons are not common, they have been sighted in the valley.

Several varieties of trout inhabit streams in the Goose Lake Valley watershed. These species include rainbow trout, brook trout, and the threatened bull trout. In addition, Goose Lake redband trout are found only in Goose Lake and its tributary. There are thirteen Oregon streams and six California streams with Great Basin redband trout populations. Because the lake can dry up during periods of drought, the stream populations are extremely important to the species survival. In the stream environment, the redbands normally reach 12 to 14 inches (30 to 36 cm) in length during their five-year life span. However, the redbands that live in Goose Lake can grow to 36 inches (91 cm). The State of California has listed the Goose Lake redband trout as one of the state's eleven Heritage Trout species.

== History ==
Native Americans used the Goose Lake Valley for thousands of years before the first Europeans people arrived. The Klamath Indians called the valley's large lake Newapkshi. Today, the lake is known as Goose Lake.

It is not clear who was the first European explorer to enter the Goose Lake Valley. A map of the Oregon Country prepared by United States Army Corps of Topographical Engineers in 1832 shows Pit Lake with a hot springs north of the lake. Given the lake's location on the map, it is clearly Goose Lake, and the hot springs are Hunter's Hot Springs. The first explorer to record his travel through the valley was John Work, who led a Hudson's Bay Company trapping expedition in 1832. In a journal entry dated 21 October 1832, Work referred to the valley's large lake as Pit Lake. Work's journal indicates a familiarity with the area, so his 1832 expedition may not have been his first visit to the valley.

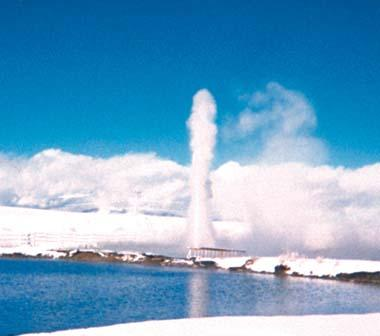
Old Perpetual geyser at Hunter's Hot Springs

The Applegate Trail wagon route, opened by Jesse and Lindsey Applegate in 1846, crossed the southern end of the Goose Lake Valley. Pioneers traveling on the Applegate Trail, descended into the valley from the Warner Mountains through Fandango Pass, arriving at the valley floor near the mouth of Davis Creek. From there, they headed south along the east shore of Goose Lake. At the south end of the lake, the trail forked. The Applegate Trail rounded the south end of the lake and continued west toward the Klamath country of southern Oregon. The other fork, known as the Lassen Cutoff, headed south across Devil's Garden and then followed the Pit River to the Sacramento Valley.

In 1849, Captain William Horace Warner, an Army topographical engineer camped in the Goose Lake Valley before taking a small survey part over the Warner Mountains into the Warner Valley. On 26 September 1849, Warner was ambushed and killed by Indians on his way back to the Goose Lake Valley camp. A number of geographical features in south-central Oregon now bear his name.

In 1864, Lieutenant Colonel C. S. Drew of the 1st Oregon Cavalry passed through the valley while on a long-range reconnaissance patrol. Several geographic features along his route now bear his name, including Drew Creek, Drews Gap, Drews Valley, and Drews Reservoir. Drews Creek flows into the Goose Lake Valley from the west.

In 1865, the United States Congress authorized the construction of the Oregon Central Military Wagon Road from Eugene, Oregon, to Fort Boise in Idaho. Congress allowed the construction company to claim three sections of land for every mile of road built. As a result, road surveyors laid out a route designed to pass through as much well watered land as possible. The route of the military road came west over Drews Gap and followed Drews Creek into the Goose Lake Valley. It passed through the valley north of Goose Lake before crossing the Warner Mountains to the east. In reality, the Oregon Central Military Wagon Road was a venture designed to acquire public lands at little or no cost to the road company's investors. The construction company was able to secure thousands of acres of valuable grazing land in the Goose Lake Valley. Legal disputes kept the ownership of these lands in question for decades, preventing settlers from claiming land grants for farms and ranches. Ownership was finally decided by the United States Supreme Court in a case known as the United States versus the California and Oregon Land Company. Eventually, the land passed into the hands of the Oregon Valley Land Company, which subdivided it into lots and parcels. The property was sold in a nationally advertised auction held in Lakeview, Oregon, in 1909.

In 1867, General George Crook began a campaign to end Indian raids in south-central Oregon. Fort Warner, located 18 miles (29 km) northeast of the Goose Lake Valley, became Crook's headquarters. Crook's troops regularly passed through the Goose Lake Valley in pursuit of Indian raiders. In 1869, the local Paiute Indians signed a treaty and Army operations in the area were discontinued. The Army abandoned Fort Warner in 1874.

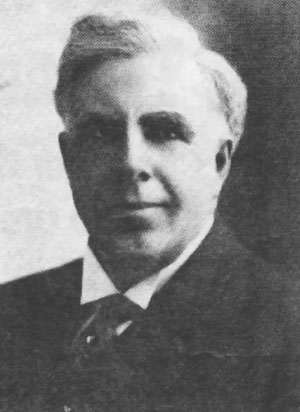
Doctor Bernard Daly

After the Indian treaty was signed at Fort Harney on December 10, 1868, settlers began to arrive in the Goose Lake Valley. New Pine Creek was established in 1869, becoming the first community in the valley. However, because of its remoteness, New Pine Creek did not get a post office until 1876. One of the first settlers to homestead north of Goose Lake was M.W. Bullard. He arrived in 1869. Bullard later donated 20 acres (8.1 ha) of his land for a courthouse and sold an additional 300 acres (1.2 km^{2}) around the courthouse site to establish a town. That town is now Lakeview, the county seat of Lake County, Oregon.

The first sawmill in the Goose Lake Valley was built in 1872. It was located in California, 6 miles (9.7 km) southeast of Goose Lake. The mill was powered by a water wheel and supplied lumber to homesteads throughout the valley. A second saw mill was established in 1874, near Davis Creek, California. Since that time, lumber production has been an important part of the valley's economy.

Doctor Bernard Daly played a very important role in the early economic development of the Goose Lake Valley. In 1897, he organized the Bank of Lakeview. When Lakeview's downtown area was destroyed by fire in May 1900, Daly financed the city's reconstruction. He helped bring the Nevada-California-Oregon Railroad to Lakeview in 1912. Daly also served as County Judge from 1902 until his death in 1920. When he died, Daly gave his fortune to the people of Lake County in the form of the Bernard Daly Educational Fund. Over the years, the Daily Fund has provided college scholarships to over two thousand Lake County students.

== Land use ==
Much of the Goose Lake Valley is privately owned agricultural land. As a result, agriculture is the primary source of income in the valley. Most of the agricultural land in the valley is used for cattle ranching. Crops are generally used for winter feed. Because of the short growing season, the valley's principal crops are hay, wheat, oats, and barley. There are also apple orchards near Davis Creek, California.

Lumber mills are also an important part of the valley's economy. The Sustained Yield Forest Management Act of 1944 helped protect the local forest products industry. The sustained yield unit, in place since the late 1940s, requires a significant portion of the timber harvested from Fremont National Forest lands to be sold to mills located within 7 miles (11 km) of Lakeview.

The mountain watersheds that drain into the valley from the north, west, and east are all part of the Fremont National Forest. The valley's southern watershed area is part of the Modoc National Forest. These public lands in and around the Goose Lake Valley offer numerous recreational opportunities including hang-gliding, hunting, fishing, hiking, birdwatching, wildlife viewing, boating, and camping.

Goose Lake State Recreation Area is managed by the Oregon Parks and Recreation Department. It is located on the east shore of Goose Lake on the Oregon side of the Oregon–California border. The campground has paved parking, public restrooms, picnic table, fire rings, and 48 spaces for trailers or recreation vehicles. There is also an open, grassy area for tent camping. Boating and birdwatching are popular park activities. A homesteader's orchard, inside the campground's boundary, draws wildlife to the area. The campground does not require reservations.

== Communities ==
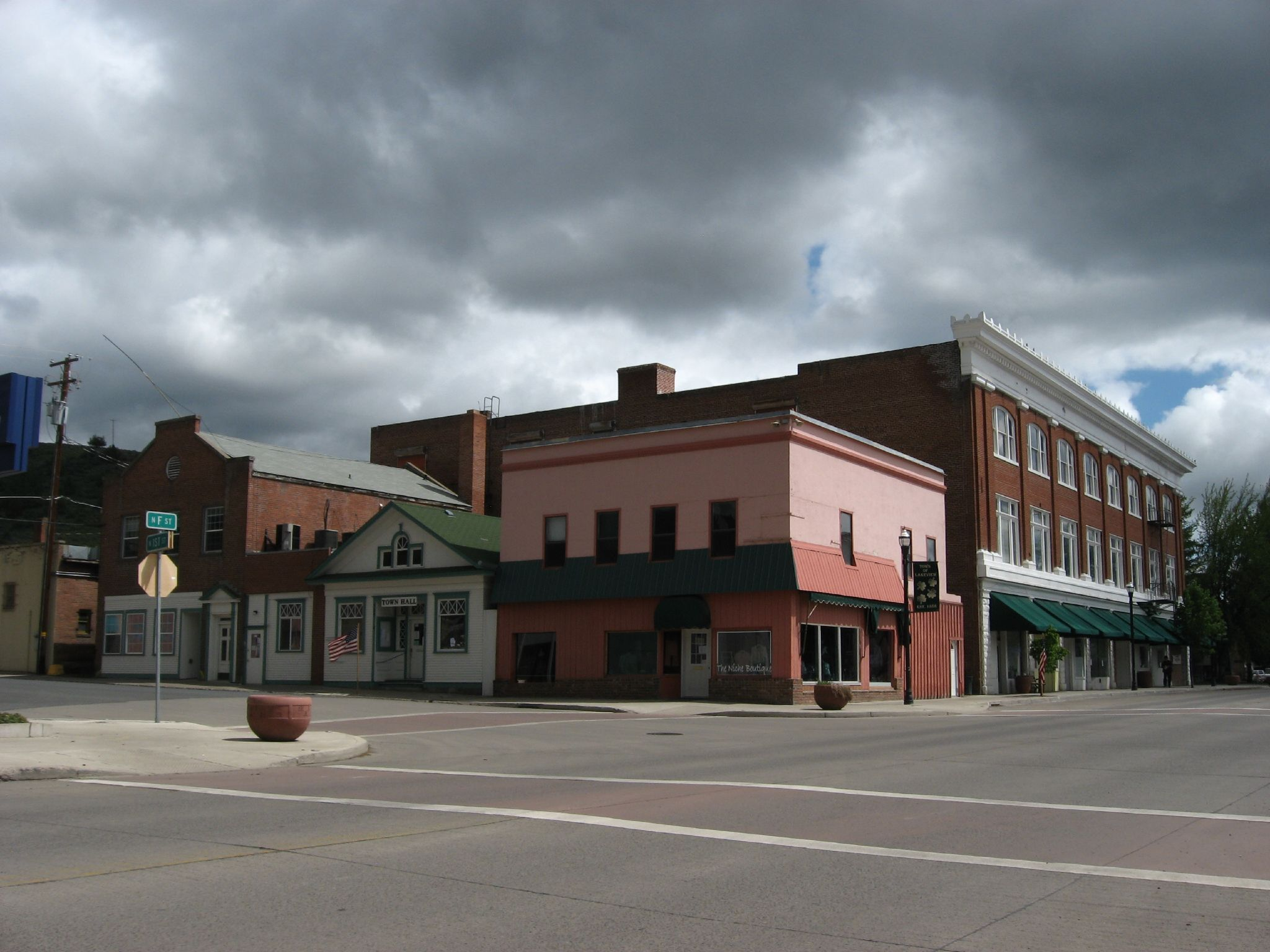
Businesses in downtown Lakeview, Oregon

- Davis Creek, California, is an unincorporated community on the east side of the Goose Lake Valley near the south end of Goose Lake.
- Lakeview, Oregon, is an incorporated city near the north end of the Goose Lake Valley. On 7 November 1876, local voters choose the town as the County seat of Lake County which had been established by the Oregon State Legislature in 1874.
- New Pine Creek, Oregon, is an unincorporated community on the east side of Goose Lake, just north of the California state line. It is named after a nearby stream. Its post office was opened on 8 December 1876.
- Pine Creek, California, is an unincorporated community on the east side of Goose Lake, just south of the Oregon state line.
