= Charles S. Drew =

American Union Army officer (1825–1886)

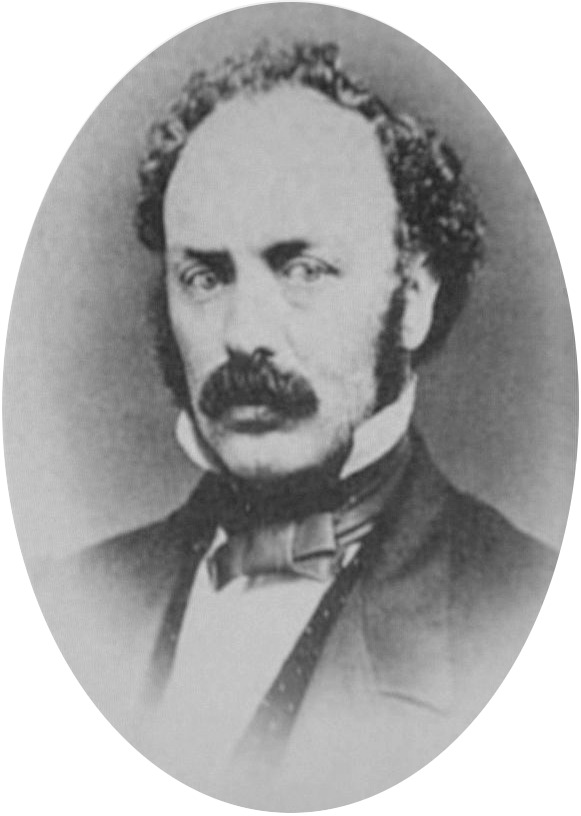
- Civil War veteran C. S. Drew in 1865
- Born: April 2, 1825; Bolton, Brome, Quebec, Canada
- Died: October 25, 1886 (aged 61); Yountville, California, US
- Military career
- Allegiance: United States of America (Union)
- Branch: Union Army
- Service years: 1854–1857 (Oregon militia); 1861–1865 (U.S. Army)
- Rank: Lieutenant colonel
- Nickname: C.S. Drew
- Unit: 1st Oregon Cavalry
- Commands: Camp Baker (Oregon); Fort Klamath
- Conflicts: Rogue River Indian War; American Civil War

Charles Stewart Drew (1825 – 1886), also known as C.S. Drew, was a representative in the legislature of the Oregon Territory of the United States and quartermaster general of the territorial militia in the 1850s. During the American Civil War, he was a Union Army officer, serving in the 1st Oregon Cavalry regiment. He eventually reached the rank of lieutenant colonel. In 1864, he led an Army reconnaissance party into southeastern Oregon. The expedition, known as the Owyhee Reconnaissance, traveled through uncharted country from Fort Klamath to Fort Boise and back. Drew was the author of two historically important military reports; one documented Native American attacks on American settlers in the Oregon Territory and the other was his report of the Owyhee Reconnaissance.

== Early life ==
Drew was born on April 2, 1825, in Bolton, Brome, Quebec, Canada. He emigrated to Oregon in the early 1850s, settling in the Rogue River Valley. By 1853, Drew was selling supplies to the Rogue River Indian people.

Drew became a leader in the movement to join southern Oregon and northern California to create a new territory. In January 1854, a meeting was held in Jacksonville, Oregon, to discuss forming a new territory. Attendees elected Drew as one of two secretaries to record the proceedings. At the meeting, letters to the United States Congress and the Oregon and California legislatures were drafted. The proceedings of the convention were published in leading west coast newspapers, but the project received no encouragement from legislators and interest in the idea waned.

In April 1854, Drew was appointed quartermaster general of the territorial militia by Oregon's Democratic governor, John W. Davis. Later that year, the voters of Jackson County elected Drew as their representative in the territorial legislature. He served in the Oregon House from December 4, 1854, until February 1, 1855. However, Drew left the Democratic Party in 1855, becoming active in the Know-Nothing political movement. As a result, Governor George L. Curry removed Drew from the quartermaster general position.

In 1855, Drew was appointed adjutant for the southern Oregon militia volunteer companies under Colonel John E. Ross. Beginning that summer, the southern Oregon militia was expanded because of the tense relations between Rogue River tribes and local settlers. By October, when the Rogue River Indian war began, there were fifteen militia companies in the field. The local Indians kept the militia busy until June 1856, when the Indians surrendered and were sent to reservations.

In 1860, Drew sent a report to the United States Congress that documented Indian attacks in the Oregon Territory. The report was titled Communication from C. S. Drew: late adjutant of the Second regiment of Oregon Mounted Volunteers, giving an account of the origin and early prosecution of the Indian war in Oregon.

== Civil War service ==
Drew served as an officer in the 1st Oregon Cavalry regiment during the American Civil War, after volunteering for service in the United States Army. On November 6, 1861, Drew was commissioned as a major in the 1st Oregon Cavalry. He entered active duty on December 21, 1861, and was assigned as commander at Camp Baker, near Jacksonville. He was promoted to lieutenant colonel in April 1863.

Drew remained at Camp Baker until June 1863, when he was ordered to abandon the camp and establish a new post in the Klamath Valley. Drew selected a site fifteen miles north of Agency Lake and supervised the construction of Fort Klamath during the summer of 1863. Local settlers including Lindsay Applegate were unhappy that the fort was not closer to existing settlements. However, the site selected by Drew was approved in October 1863 by United States Army inspector general. The inspector general also cleared Drew of charges that he had awarded Army contracts to confederate sympathizers. Drew served as commander of Fort Klamath from June 1863 through June 1864.

== Owyhee Reconnaissance ==
In the summer of 1864, Drew was order to organize and lead an Army expedition to size up the Indian situation in southeastern Oregon and determine if additional outposts were needed to protect immigrants. Drew left Fort Klamath on July 1 on what became known as the Owyhee Reconnaissance. His reconnaissance party was made up of 39 enlisted troops, a medical officer, and eight support personnel, including scouts, teamsters, and a blacksmith.

After leaving Fort Klamath, Drew and his men proceeded to the Williamson River, and then along the Sprague River, following the river to its source. Drew led his party over the low mountains into what in now Drews Valley and then over Drews Gap into the Goose Lake Valley. The expedition traveled around the north end of Goose Lake and then south along the east side of the lake for 21 miles until their path crossed the Applegate Trail. At that point, Drew met several immigrant parties. Fearing Indian attacks, the civilian parties decide to follow Drew's troops. The expanded company took Fandango Pass over the Warner Mountains into Surprise Valley. They then traveled northwest, passing around the north end of Cowhead Lake and over broken high desert country into the Warner Valley. Drew's party left the Warner Valley, moving east to the Pueblo Valley, and then north to the Army post at Camp Alvord east of Steens Mountain. The last immigrant wagon reached Camp Alvord on August 31.

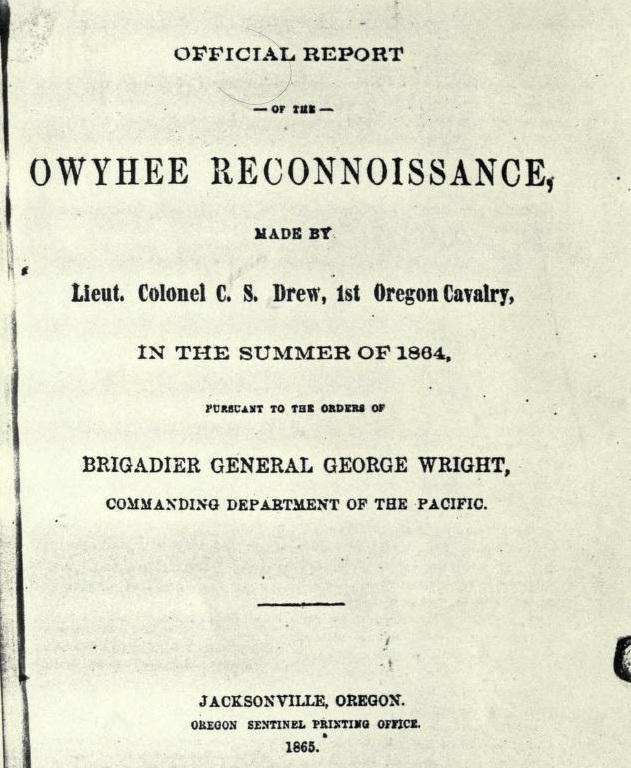
Drew's Owyhee Reconnaissance report

Because escort duty had slowed down their pace of travel, Drew had to cancels plans for exploring the Owyhee country to the river's headwaters. Instead, Drew along with nineteen troops escorted the immigrant wagon train through the Jordon Creek Valley and on to Fort Boise. Drew and his men then returned to Camp Alvord, arriving there on September 22. At Camp Alvord, Drew received orders to return immediately to Fort Klamath to participate in treaty negotiations with Indian tribes that had been skirmishing with settlers in the Klamath Valley and attacking wagon trains along the Applegate Trail.

Drew's return route was a direct line of march from Camp Alvord to the Warner Valley. Instead of heading south to the Surprise Valley and Fandango Pass, Drew found a new pass through the Warner Mountains leading directly to the north end of the Goose Lake Valley. This new route was over one hundred miles shorter than his outbound track. Combined with the route he charted from Camp Alvord to Fort Boise, Drew cut almost three hundred miles from the original Applegate Trail route from Fort Hall to southern Oregon.

Drew successfully completed his mission, returning to Fort Klamath on October 18, 1864. However, he did not arrive in time to take part in the treaty negotiations. The peace council with the Klamath, Modoc, and Yahooskin Indians had begun on October 9 and the treaty was signed on October 15, 1864, near Fort Klamath.

After returning from the reconnaissance, Drew submitted his resignation from the 1st Oregon Cavalry. The reason for his resignation is unknown. On November 21, 1864, Major General Irvin McDowell, commander of the Army's Department of the Pacific, approved Drew's released from active duty as soon as his Owyhee Reconnaissance report was completed. McDowell also authorized Drew to return to Jacksonville to write his report. His resignation become effective on January 31, 1865. Drew's report was published in the Jacksonville Sentinel in serial form from January 28 to March 11, 1865. It was also published as a 32-page pamphlet, which was printed in Jacksonville.

== Later life ==
After leaving the Army, Drew invested $1,200 in a gold mine near Jacksonville. He operated the Occidental Quartz Mill until 1868. In May 1869, The Oregon Sentinel reported that Drew was "traveling with a splendid outfit" in the employ of San Francisco businessmen. The Sacramento Daily Union of February 5, 1876, lists him among the incorporators of a gold and silver mining company in Elko County, Nevada. Drew died in a veterans home in Yountville, California, on 25 October 1886.

== Legacy ==
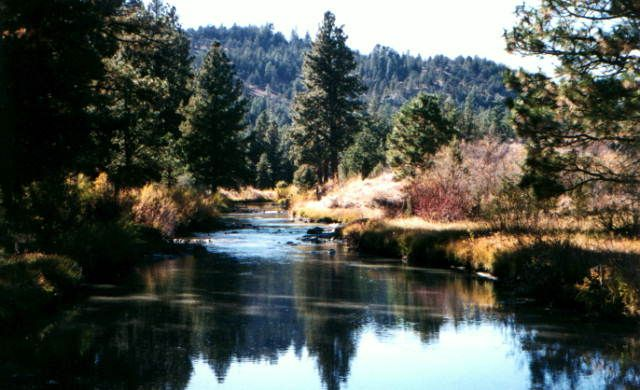
Drews Creek in Oregon's Fremont National Forest

There are at least four geographic features in Oregon that bear Drew's name, all located in Lake County. Drews Gap is located 14 miles (23 km) west of Lakeview, Oregon, on Oregon Route 140. Elevation at the gap is 5,306 feet (1,617 m). Drews Valley is 2 miles (3.2 km) west of Drews Gap. Drews Creek flows southeast through Drews Valley into Goose Lake. Drews Reservoir is created by an irrigation dam on upper Drews Creek. The reservoir covers the eastern end of Drews Valley.

In addition, Drew named and recorded the location of a number of Oregon geographical features including the Sprague River, Warner Valley, and Beatys Butte.

The record of Drew's 1864 reconnaissance through southeastern Oregon is recorded in a 32-page pamphlet titled Official Report of the Owyhee Reconnaissance, made by Lieutenant Colonel C.S. Drew, 1st Oregon cavalry, in the summer of 1864, Pursuant to the Orders of Brigadier General George Wright, Commanding Department of the Pacific. It was published in Jacksonville, Oregon in 1865 by the Oregon Sentinel Printing office. The report was also published in serial form by the Oregon Sentinel newspaper between January 28 and March 11, 1865. Original copies of the pamphlet are extremely rare. Copies are in archival collections at the University of California at Berkeley, Indiana University, and several private library collections, including The Huntington Library. It is important because it is one of the earliest records of southeast Oregon's topography, identifying and mapping many geographic features for the first time. It also records the day-to-day details of a major Civil War era military reconnaissance operation in the western United States. In addition, Drew's route was followed by the Oregon Central Military Wagon Road.

A hardcover version of Drew's report of Indian attacks on settlers in the Oregon Territory was published by Ye Galleon Press of Fairfield, Washington in 1973. It was titled An Account of the Origin and Early Prosecution of the Indian War in Oregon.
