= New Pine Creek =

New Pine Creek may refer to:

- New Pine Creek, California
- New Pine Creek, Oregon
