= Lake County School District =

School district in Oregon, United States

Lake County School District #7
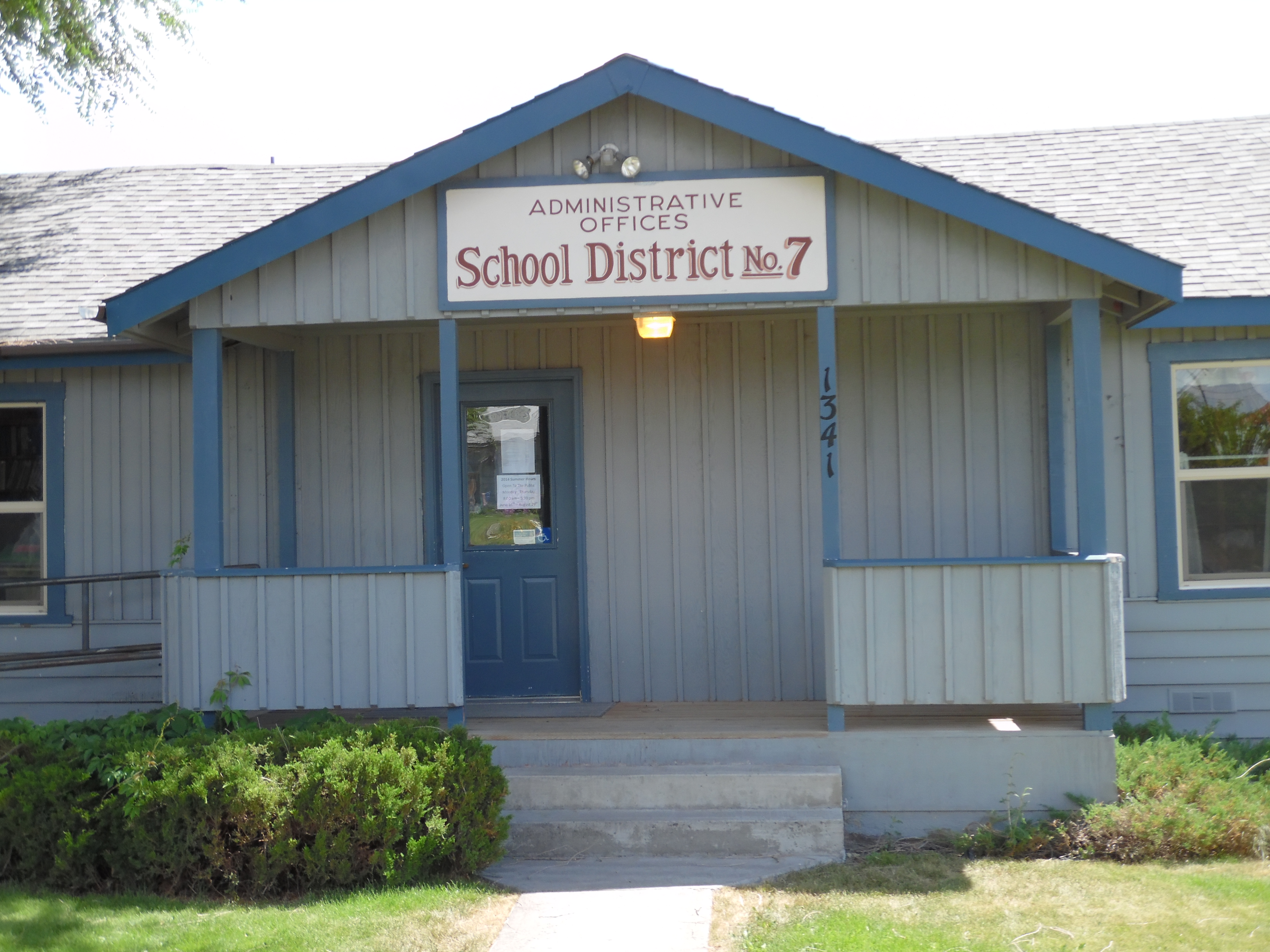

Location
- Lakeview, Oregon United States
- Coordinates: 42°11′17.96″N 120°21′07.8″W

District information
- Motto: District 7 administrative office
- Grades: K-12
- Superintendent: Will Cahill

Students and staff
- Students: 775
- Teachers: 76
- Staff: 26
- Athletic conference: Southern Cascade League
- District mascot: Honker

Other information
- Website: lakeview.k12.or.us

Lake County School District 7 is a public school district serving the southern part of Lake County, Oregon, United States including the town of Lakeview and the surrounding communities. Students from the Lake County School District are eligible for several college scholarships including the Bernard Daly Educational Fund, the Collins-McDonald Fund, and Burt Snyder Fund.

It is also known as Lakeview School District 7.

== Attendance areas ==
The district's service area includes Lakeview.

Lakeview High, along with Paisley School, takes high students from Adel and Plush, which are in their own K-8 districts.

== Education ==
The Lake County School District has three elementary schools. Fremont Elementary School teaches student from kindergarten through 3rd grade. The A. D. Hay Elementary School has student from 4th through 6th grade, and Union School has student from kindergarten through 6th grade. All three schools rank high in the performance areas measured by the No Child Left Behind Act. The schools also have a very high percentage of students meeting Oregon’s statewide assessments in reading and mathematics as well as the Oregon Department of Education academic standards.

Daly Middle School is the district’s only school for 7th and 8th graders. The school is named after Bernard Daly a pioneer doctor from Lakeview. The middle school is located adjacent to the high school and shares staff and facilities. The school offers all state-required classes. It also provides physical education and health classes for both 7th and 8th graders. Middle school students also have the opportunity to take electives in band, choir, art, computer science, agriculture, business, wood shop, investigative science, and specialized science programs. As of 2008, the Daly Middle School had 110 students.

The district has one high school. The goal of Lakeview High School is to begin students along a path of lifelong learning and encouraging students to make positive contributions to their community. Students develop critical thinking and problem solving skills, study literature and mathematics, and do independent research. They also have the opportunity to accumulate broad knowledge that enables them to thoughtfully contribute society.

The high school’s enrollment has been slowly declining for some time. During the 2005/2006 academic year, the three-year senior high school had 286 students. As of 2008, the enrollment had dropped to 250 students.

== Scholarships ==
Students from the Lake County School District are eligible for several substantial college scholarships including the Bernard Daly Educational Fund, the Collins-McDonald Fund, and Burt Snyder Fund. Over the years, these scholarships have effectively promoted advanced academic education in a relatively isolated part of eastern Oregon. The Daly Fund has been particularly important. Established in 1922 by Doctor Bernard Daly, the Fund has provided generous college scholarships for over 2,000 Lake County students.

== Schools ==
- Fremont School
- A. D. Hay School
- Union School in West Side
- Daly Middle School
- Lakeview High School

== See also ==
- List of school districts in Oregon
- North Lake School District
- Paisley School District
