= Summer Lake Hot Springs =

Thermal springs in Oregon

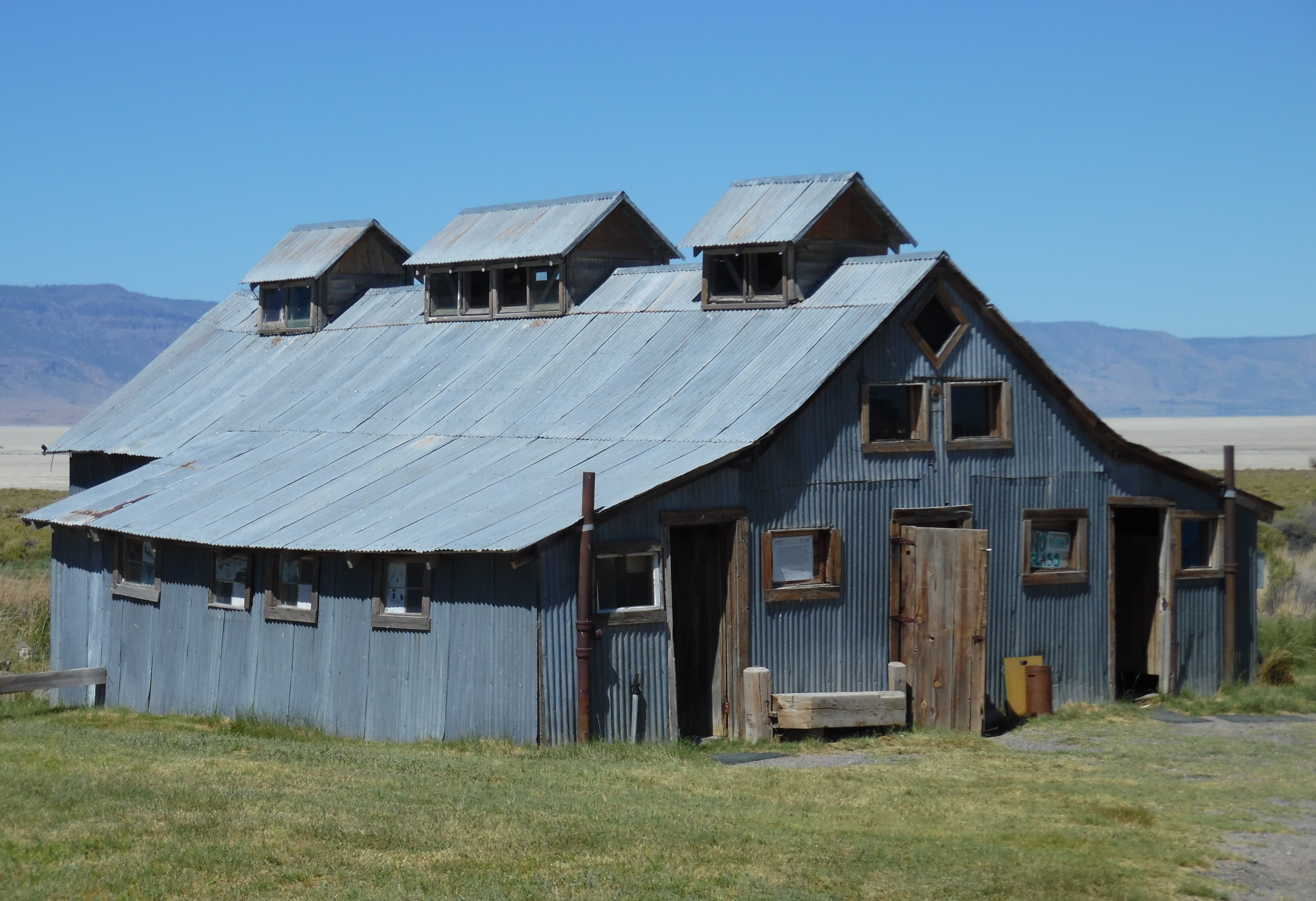
- Hot springs bathhouse built in 1928

- Location within Oregon
- Interactive map of Summer Lake Hot Springs
- Location: Lake County, Oregon
- Coordinates: 42°43′30″N 120°38′49″W
- Elevation: 4,268 feet (1,301 m)
- Type: Natural hot spring
- Temperature: 124 °F (51 °C)

Summer Lake Hot Springs are natural hot springs at the south end of Summer Lake in south-central Oregon. They are artesian mineral springs with four surface sources. The springs have complex water chemistry. The temperature of the main source is approximately 123 °F (51 °C) with a water flow of approximately 20 US gallons (76 L) per minute. Over the years, the site has been developed as a rustic family bathing and relaxation resort. The hot springs are 124 miles (200 km) southeast of Bend, Oregon, near the small town of Paisley, Oregon.

== Hot mineral springs ==
Summer Lake Hot Springs are natural artesian springs that emit geothermally heated groundwater with a complex mineral content. In 1908, the United States Geological Survey reported that the hot springs were probably the result of faulting, noting that the springs were located at the base of a mountain with a steep rim rock face. Later, the Geological Survey identified the geology below the springs as lake sediment overlaying basalt rock. Eventually, four separate springs were identified at the site.

In 1937, the Geological Survey measured the main spring’s temperature at 123 °F (51 °C) with a flow of 20 US gallons (76 L) per minute. In 1948, the Geological Survey re-measured the flow at 21 US gallons (79 L) per minute. A more detailed measurement in 1978 found the reservoir temperature below the springs varied between 107 °F (42 °C) and 134 °F (57 °C) with an average reservoir temperature of 118 °F (48 °C) 118. The average surface temperature of the springs was 109 °F (43 °C) with discharge of 20 US gallons (76 L) per minute. In 2012, the Oregon Department of Geology and Mineral Industries reported that the hot springs’ temperature was 124 °F (51 °C) with a water flow of 20 US gallons (76 L) per minute. At the release point in the main pool of the Summer Lake Hot Springs bathhouse, the water temperature is approximately 113 °F (45 °C). The three other hot springs produce water temperatures between 106 °F (41 °C) and 118 °F (48 °C) at their release points.

The water chemistry at the springs is complex. The water has heavy concentrations of sodium (399 ppm), potassium (374 ppm), chloride (285 ppm), sulfur (111 ppm), and silica (96 ppm). The water also contains smaller amounts of boron (4.1 ppm), fluorine (2.2 ppm), calcium (1.4 ppm), and magnesium (.4 ppm). There are also traces of lithium, hydrogen carbonate, iron, and aluminum found in the water.

== Local environment ==
The climate in the Summer Lake Valley including the area around Summer Lake Hot Springs, is milder than much of Oregon’s high desert county. This is due to the protection provided by Winter Ridge that rises approximately 3,000 feet (910 m) above the west side of the valley. The temperature in the area averages 80 °F (27 °C) to 90 °F (32 °C) during the summer months and 20 °F (−7 °C) to 30 °F (−1 °C) in the winter. The extreme high and low temperatures generally reach 105 °F (41 °C) on the high side with lows around −25 °F (−32 °C). Precipitation in the area around the hot springs averages 12 inches (30 cm) per year.

The soil around Summer Lake is mostly layered lakebed sand and silt sediments. The soil deposits are several hundred feet deep. On the surface, winds transport sand and soil particles across the Summer Lake playa, creating dunes along the shoreline of the lake. The landscape’s plant life is dominated by desert shrubs, primarily big sagebrush, green rabbitbrush, and black greasewood.

Larger mammals found near the hot springs include mule deer, coyotes, bobcats, and cougars. American badgers, black-tailed jackrabbits, white-tailed jackrabbits, and Mountain cottontail are common in the area. Smaller mammals found around the hot springs include Belding's ground squirrels, golden-mantled ground squirrels, least chipmunks, and Ord's kangaroo rats.

There are 250 bird species found in the Summer Lake Valley. As a result, the area around Summer Lake Hot Springs is an excellent place for birdwatching. Summer Lake is an important stop on the Pacific flyway, so migrating waterfowl pass through the area twice a year. This includes Canada geese, snow geese, swans, mallards, cinnamon teal, and other duck species. Many shore birds are also common in the area, including American avocets, snowy plovers, black-necked stilts, willets, Wilson's phalaropes, great egrets, and sandhill cranes. Among the smaller birds, cliff swallows are common. Local birds of prey include great horned owls, red-tailed hawks, and golden eagles.

== History ==
Native Americans occupied the area around Summer Lake Hot Springs for at least 14,000 years. Evidence of this was found in the Paisley Caves, which are located just a few miles east of the springs. To Native Americans, the artesian hot springs at the south end of Summer Lake were known as Medicine Springs. In 1843, Captain John C. Fremont passed near the springs while exploring south central Oregon. It was Fremont who named the large alkaline lake just north of the hot springs, Summer Lake. The hot springs are named after the lake.

The early pioneers in the Summer Lake area called the springs Woodward Hot Springs. The springs were named after the Woodward family who arrived in 1902 and were among the first pioneers to homestead at the south end of the Summer Lake. The springs were initially used for irrigating vegetable gardens and for bathing. Members of the Woodward family lived at the site until at least 1907.

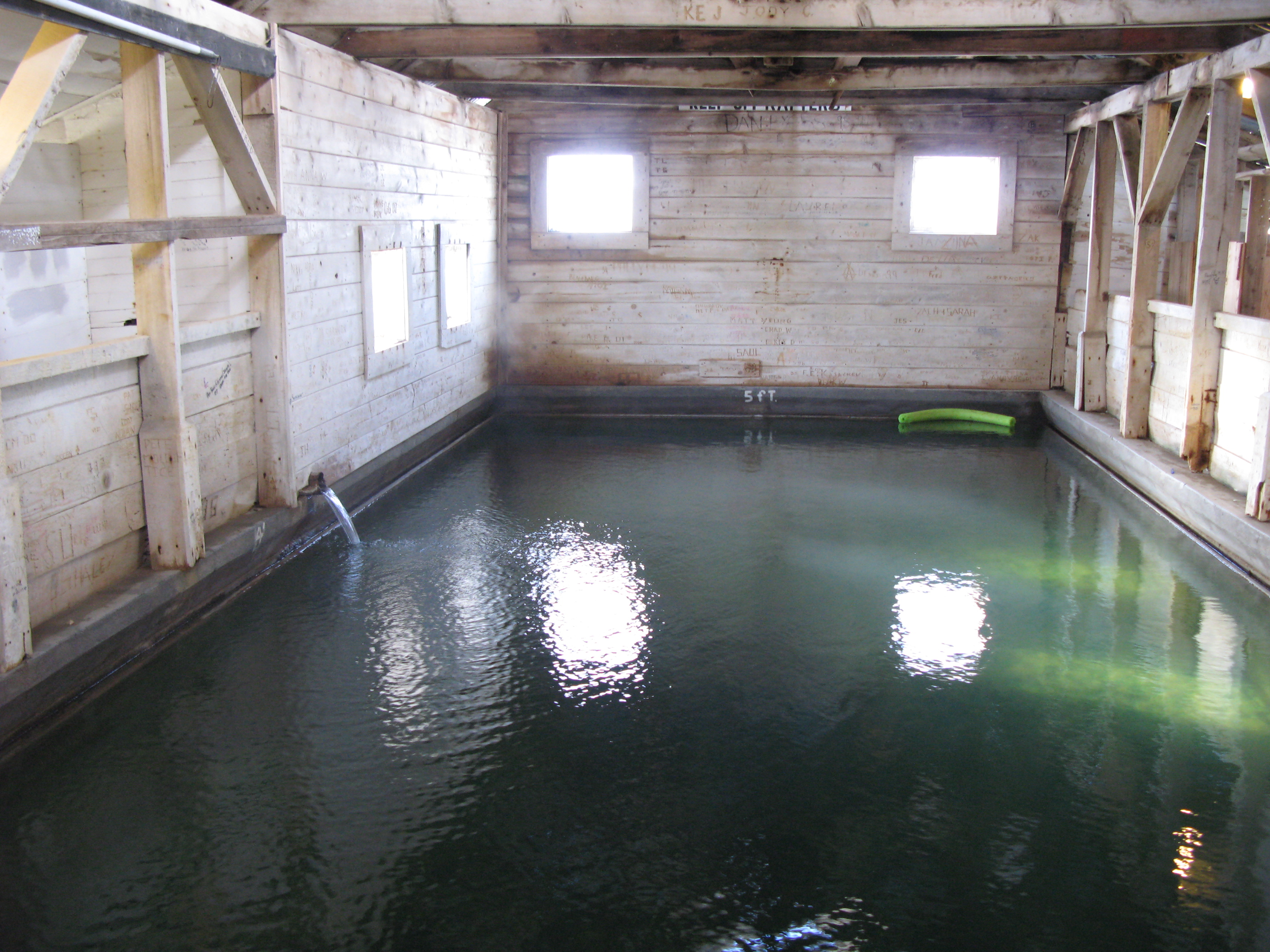
Original bathhouse hot pool

The Summer Lake Hot Springs bathhouse was built in 1928. It is a rustic wood frame structure covered with corrugated tin panels. Inside the building there is a 15-by-30-foot (4.6 m × 9.1 m) bathing pool along with men's and women's dressing rooms.

Over the years, thousands of Native American artifacts were found at the Summer Lake Hot Springs site including many high-quality arrowheads. In addition to the artifacts, fossil bones of extinct Pleistocene horses and camels have been found at the site. In 1959, a large cache of Native American artifacts were found at the Summer Lake Hot Springs site. The artifacts included a large lava metate grinding stone with three legs for stability. The cache was discovered during a construction project undertaken to expand the mineral bath into a commercial resort.

While Summer Lake Hot Springs had long been used for bathing, the site was not developed into a commercial resort until 1959. The project that began resort development was undertaken by Jeff McDaniel shortly after he bought the hot springs property from Ray Gibson. McDaniel kept the original bathhouse while adding several cottages and a barn. He also installed hook-ups to accommodate travel trailers and recreational vehicles. McDaniel and his wife ran the resort until 1985, when the operation was taken over by their son. He sold the hot springs to Duane Graham in 1997.

After purchasing the 145-acre (59 ha) property, Graham continued to develop the resort around the old bathhouse. Today, the bathing facilities include the original bathhouse and two outdoor hot water bathing pools. The overnight accommodations consist of rental cottages and duplexes, studio cabins, recreational vehicle parking spaces, and a tent camping area. Other amenities include picnic tables, fire pits, and a public restroom and shower building. The resort property also has several ponds as well as nature trails for hikers.

Over the years, the Summer Lake Hot Springs resort has hosted a number of festivals, concerts, and other events. From 2006 to 2014, the Coyote Festival was held in mid-summer while the Outback Music Festival was an annual fall event. These festivals featured folk, rock, and bluegrass musicians from around Oregon. Other events held at the site included astronomy, yoga, and photography workshops.

== Access ==
The Summer Lake Hot Springs are located just off Oregon Route 31, 6 miles (9.7 km) northwest of Paisley, Oregon. The Federal Highway Administration has designated Oregon Route 31 as the Outback Scenic Byway, part of National Scenic Byway system. The nearest large population center is Bend, Oregon, which is located 124 miles (200 km) northwest of the hot springs.

== See also ==
- List of hot springs in the United States
- Antelope Hot Springs
- Hunter's Hot Springs
