= Davis Creek, California =

Unincorporated community in California, United States

Davis Creek
- Unincorporated community
- Location in California Davis Creek (the United States)
- Coordinates: 41°44′00″N 120°22′19″W
- Country: United States
- State: California
- County: Modoc
- Elevation: 4,846 ft (1,477 m)

Davis Creek is an unincorporated community in Modoc County, California, United States. It is located 19 miles (31 km) north-northeast of Alturas, at an elevation of 4846 feet (1477 m). A post office, service station, and mini-mart are housed in a single structure. The ZIP Code is 96108. The community is served by area code 530.

== History ==
Settlement of Goose Lake Valley at Davis Creek began with a single log cabin in 1869. The Davis Creek post office opened in 1877, and changed its name to Davis Creek in 1879.

During Goose Lake's high-water years, at least from 1908 to 1912, Davis Creek served as the southern port on the lake to and from which the ferry, Lakeview carried passengers and cargo for the town of Lakeview, Oregon at the north end of the lake. The Nevada-California-Oregon Railway from Reno reached Davis Creek in 1911. The port fell into disuse as lake waters receded and the railroad was completed to Lakeview.

A 1913 book described Davis Creek as being on Goose Lake and having a population of 150.

In the early 1960s, U.S. Route 395 was realigned, bypassing Davis Creek's business section, leading to the closure of most businesses there, and the construction of a newer general store on the new highway.

== Politics ==
In the state legislature, Davis Creek is in the 1st Senate District, represented by Republican Ted Gaines, and in the 2nd Assembly District, represented by Republican Jim Nielsen.

Federally, Davis Creek is in California's 1st congressional district, represented by Republican James Gallagher.
