= Hunters Hot Springs (disambiguation) =

Hunters Hot Springs are a group of hot springs in Lake County, Oregon.

Hunters Hot Springs may also refer to:

- Hunters Hot Springs (Montana), hot springs in Park County, Montana, in the Paradise Valley
- Hunters Hot Springs, Montana, an unincorporated community in Park County, Montana near the hot springs
