= Fairport =

Fairport may refer to:

- Fairport, California
- Fairport, Iowa
- Fairport, Michigan
- Fairport, Missouri
- Fairport, New York
- Fairport, North Carolina
- Fairport, Virginia
- Fairport Harbor, Ohio
- Dresden, Ontario, formerly named 'Fairport', a town in Ontario, Canada
- Fairport Convention, the British folk rock band
