= West Side, Oregon =

Unincorporated community in the state of Oregon, United States

- Unincorporated community
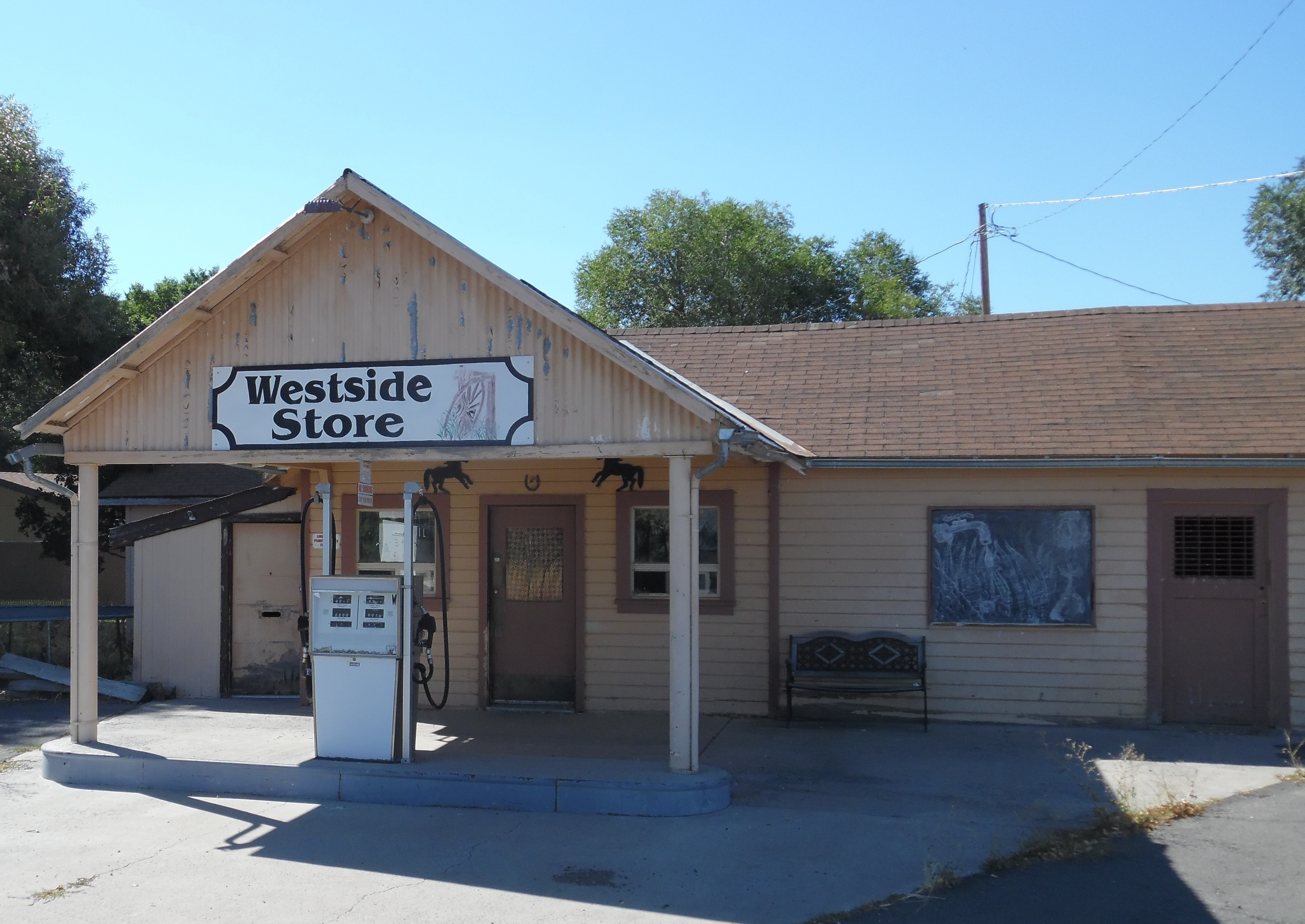
- Community store and gas station

- Location within Oregon Location within the United States
- Coordinates: 42°06′48″N 120°29′37″W
- Country: United States
- State: Oregon
- County: Lake
- Elevation: 4,774 ft (1,455 m)
- Time zone: UTC-8 (Pacific (PST))
  - Summer (DST): UTC-7 (PDT)
- ZIP codes: 97630
- GNIS feature ID: 1128894

West Side (also Westside) is a rural unincorporated community in Lake County, Oregon, located about 12 miles southwest of Lakeview.

== History and infrastructure ==
The community was named for the Westside Store, and indirectly for its position on the western side of Goose Lake. The West Side post office was established in June 1923 and closed on July 31, 1942. Will C. Fleming was the first postmaster. West Side currently has a Lakeview mailing address.

Union Elementary School in West Side was established in 1919. It is part of the Lake County School District. Thomas Creek-Westside Rural Fire Protection District has a fire station in Westside. West Side Cemetery is located about two miles west of the community. The Westside Grange #854 has long had a presence in the community.
