= Fairport, California =

Fairport
- Former settlement
- Location in California
- Coordinates: 41°59′07″N 120°19′19″W
- Country: United States
- State: California
- County: Modoc
- Elevation: 4,741 ft (1,445 m)

Fairport is a former settlement in Modoc County, California, United States. For 20 years, Fairport was a thriving resort community, and the supply and departure depot for the High Grade Mining District in the Warner Mountains.

It was located 2 miles (3.2 km) southwest of New Pine Creek, 0.3 miles (0.5 km) east of Goose Lake, along the Southern Pacific Railroad, 2.5 miles (4 km) north of Cottonwood Creek, at an elevation of 4741 feet (1445 m).

A post office operated at Fairport from 1912 to 1932, with a closure in part of 1924. Fairport was a transshipment point for cattle and timber.

During its heyday, Fairport competed with nearby New Pine Creek to become the dominant town between Sugar Hill and Lakeview, Oregon, but when mining ended and lake waters receded, its usefulness waned. A loose cluster of homes remains, but the business buildings and post office were demolished, the town has not appeared on local maps since the Depression Era, and it has lost its identity as a community.

== Climate ==
This region experiences warm (but not hot) and dry summers, with no average monthly temperatures above 71.6 °F. According to the Köppen Climate Classification system, Fairport has a warm-summer Mediterranean climate, abbreviated "Csb" on climate maps.
