= New Pine Creek, Oregon =

Unincorporated community in the state of Oregon, United States

- Census-designated place
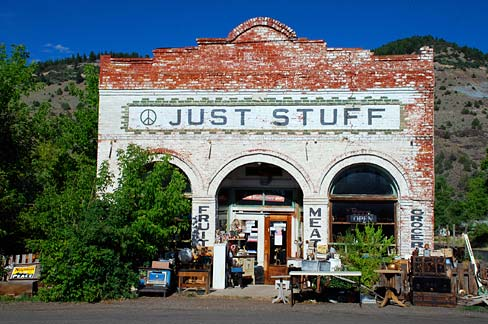
- New Pine Creek store

- Location within Oregon Location within the United States
- Coordinates: 42°00′02″N 120°18′10″W
- Country: United States
- State: Oregon
- County: Lake
- Named for: Pine Creek

Area
  - Total: 2.47 sq mi (6.41 km^{2})
  - Land: 2.47 sq mi (6.41 km^{2})
  - Water: 0 sq mi (0.00 km^{2})
- Elevation: 4,790 ft (1,460 m)

Population (2020)
  - Total: 111
  - Density: 45/sq mi (17.3/km^{2})
- Time zone: UTC-8 (PST)
  - Summer (DST): UTC-7 (PDT)
- ZIP code: 97635
- Area code: 541
- FIPS code: 41-52400
- GNIS feature ID: 2612515

New Pine Creek is a census-designated place and unincorporated community in Lake County, Oregon, United States. It is Oregon's southernmost community. As of the 2020 census, New Pine Creek had a population of 111. It has a post office with a ZIP code 97635. New Pine Creek lies on U.S. Route 395 at the Oregon–California border, just north of New Pine Creek, California, and east of Goose Lake.

West of town is the Goose Lake State Recreation Area, along Stateline Road near the lake. The north–south running Lake County Railroad passes near the recreation area. East of town is the Fremont National Forest.

Thought to be Lake County's oldest settlement, New Pine Creek was originally to be named "Pine Creek" after a nearby stream. However, since another community was already using that name, postal authorities preferred an alternative. The New Pine Creek post office opened in 1876. S. A. Hamersley was the first postmaster.

Historical population
Census	Pop.	Note	%±
1890	65		—
1900	111		70.8%
1910	175		57.7%
1920	318		81.7%
1930	142		−55.3%
2020	111		—

New Pine Creek is the southernmost settlement in the state of Oregon, accepted as part of the state despite being south of the 42nd parallel boundary line nominally separating Oregon from California. This line was set as the boundary between what were then Oregon Country and New Spain by the Adams–Onís Treaty (effective 1821), and maintained when Oregon and California were admitted as states. However, a surveying error in 1868 caused part of New Pine Creek to be placed in Oregon. Delegations from California and Oregon held talks on the issue in 1984 after the error was discovered, but did not ultimately change New Pine Creek's status.

== Climate ==
This region experiences warm (but not hot) and dry summers, with no average monthly temperatures above 71.6 °F (22.0 °C). According to the Köppen Climate Classification system, New Pine Creek has a warm-summer Mediterranean climate, abbreviated "Csb" on climate maps.

== Education ==
It is in the Lakeview School District.

The area where New Pine Creek is in is not in any community college district, but the county has a "contract-out-of-district" (COD) with Klamath Community College.
