= Silver Lake Forest Service Strip =

- IATA: none; ICAO: none; FAA LID: 45S

Summary
- Airport type: Public
- Operator: US Forest Service
- Location: Silver Lake, Oregon
- Elevation AMSL: 4,492 ft / 1,369 m
- Coordinates: 43°06′39.5010″N 121°05′39.00″W
- Interactive map of Silver Lake Forest Service Strip

Runways
Direction	Length		Surface
Direction	ft	m	Surface
3/21	3,000	914	Gravel/dirt

Silver Lake Forest Service Strip (FAA LID: 45S) is a public airport located three miles (4.8 km) southwest of Silver Lake in Lake County, Oregon, United States.
