= Bernard Daly Educational Fund =

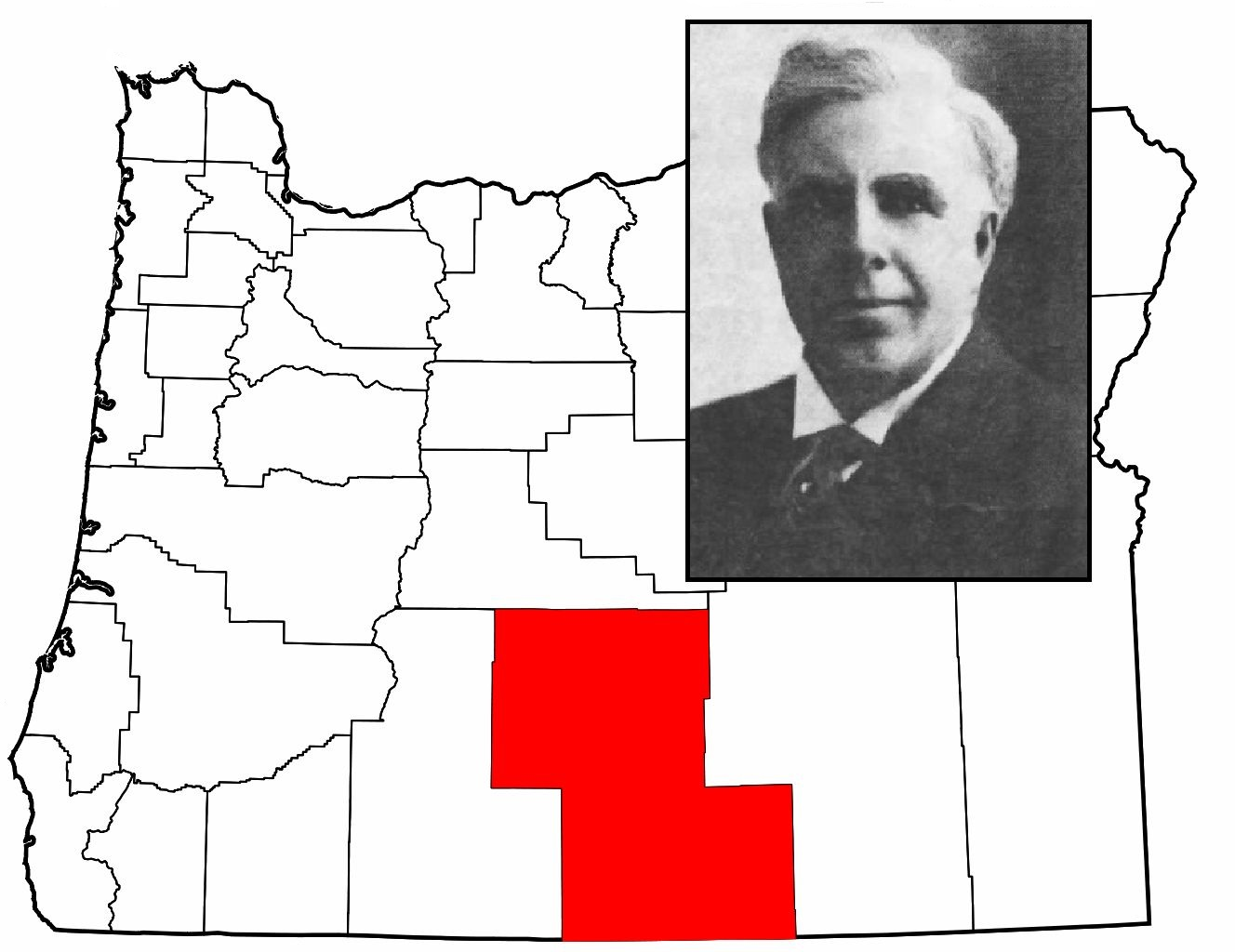
- Dr. Daly with map of Lake County, Oregon
- Founded: 1922
- Founder: Bernard Daly
- Type: Private trust fund
- Purpose: Education
- Location: Lakeview, Oregon, USA
- Region served: Lake County, Oregon
- Method: College scholarships
- Key people: Dr. Mike Sabin (chairman)

The Bernard Daly Educational Fund is an education trust fund established in 1922 for the benefit of students graduating from high school in Lake County, Oregon. It is the oldest continuously operated place-based college scholarship fund in the United States. The fund is managed by a local board of trustees. In 2006, its assets total over $6,800,000 (equivalent to $10,860,000 in 2025), making it one of the largest scholarship funds in Oregon.

== Bernard Daly ==
Bernard Daly was a doctor, businessman, banker, rancher, state representative, state senator, county judge, and regent of Oregon State Agricultural College (now Oregon State University). Daly was born in Ireland on February 17, 1858. He immigrated to the United States with his parents in 1864. After graduating from medical school, he joined the United States Army. In 1887, Daly left the army and moved to Lakeview, Oregon where he began a private medical practice. Over the years, Daly played a very important role in the economic development of Lake County, establishing a number of successful businesses.

When Daly died on January 4, 1920, he had business interests throughout Lake County. He was the largest stockholder in the Bank of Lakeview. He owned the largest ranch in south-central Oregon as well as a number of other businesses. He also owned at least 14 buildings in downtown Lakeview. All together his partnerships and investments brought the value of his estate to almost $1,000,000 (equivalent to $16,071,000 in 2025.

== Scholarship fund ==
In his will, Daly gave his fortune to the people of Lake County in the form of the Bernard Daly Educational Fund. In his will, Daly wrote:

It is my earnest desire to help, aid and assist worthy and ambitious young men and women of my beloved county of Lake, to acquire a good education, so that they may be better fitted and qualified to appreciate and help to preserve the laws and constitution of this free country, defend its flag, and by their conduct as good citizens reflect honor on Lake county and the state of Oregon.

The fact that his will specifically directed that Daly scholarships be granted to women as well as men was very progressive for that era. Based on the terms of the will, the scholarships must be used to attend "schools, colleges, and technical schools of the State of Oregon."

The first Daly Fund scholarships were awarded in 1922. Today, the education fund Daly established is the oldest continuously operating place-based college scholarship in the United States. It provides scholarships to three Lake County high schools, located in Lakeview, Paisley, and Silver Lake. Together, the three schools graduate approximately 100 students per year. Each year, approximately 40 Lake County students attend college on Daly scholarships. The scholarship provides $2,000 per term, up to a maximum of $8,200 per year for four years. Since the fund was established, over 2,000 students from Lake County communities have attended college on Daly Fund scholarships.

As a result of Daly Fund scholarships, Lake County is one of the best educated counties in Oregon. As of 1989, four of the town’s six attorneys, half of its doctors, five of its seven pharmacists, and all of the dentists in the community went to college with Daly scholarship.

== Fund administration ==
Since it was established in 1922, the Fund has continued to grow. As of 2006, it had over $6,800,000 in assets available to support scholarships for Lake County students (equivalent to $10,860,000 in 2025).

The Bernard Daly Educational Fund is governed by a five-person board of trustees. As of 2007, the trustees are: Dr. Mike Sabin of Lakeview (chairman); James C. Lynch of Lakeview (secretary/treasurer); Alan Parks of Silver Lake (trustee); and Ann Tracy of Lakeview (trustee).

== See also ==
- Lakeview High School
- North Lake School District
- Paisley School District
