= Bernard Daly =

American politician (1858–1920)

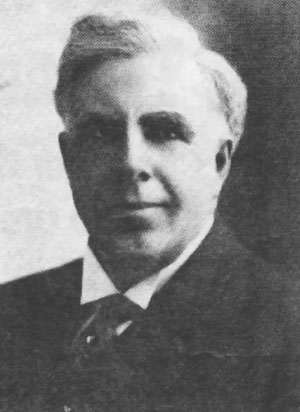

Member of the Oregon State Senate
- In office 1897–1900
- Constituency: Crook *, Klamath, and Lake counties (* Deschutes and Jefferson counties were part of Crook County at that time)

Member of the Oregon House of Representatives
- In office 1892–1896

Personal details
- Born: 17 February 1858 Ireland
- Died: 4 January 1920 (aged 61) Livermore, California, USA
- Party: Democratic
- Profession: Doctor

Bernard Daly (17 February 1858 – 4 January 1920) was an American country doctor, businessman, banker, rancher, state representative, state senator, county judge, and regent of Oregon State Agricultural College (today's Oregon State University). He also ran for United States Congress, and was his party's candidate for the United States Senate. Daly's educational trust fund has financed college educations for generations of Lake County, Oregon students, a legacy that continues to this day.

== Life ==
Daly was born in Ireland on 17 February 1858. He immigrated with his parents to the United States in 1864, and the family settled in Selma, Alabama. As a young man, Daly attended college in Ohio, and then medical school at the University of Louisville in Kentucky. After graduating from medical school, he joined the United States Army, and was posted to Fort Bidwell, California. In 1887, Daly was mustered out of the army, and he moved fifty miles north to Lakeview, Oregon where he began a private medical practice.

During a Christmas Eve party in 1894, an oil lamp started a fire in a crowded community hall in the small town of Silver Lake, Oregon. Forty-three people were killed in the blaze, and many more were badly injured. Daly drove his horse and buggy from Lakeview to Silver Lake, a distance of ninety-five miles, over bad, snow-covered roads to help victims of the tragedy. It took twenty-four hours of continuous travel for Daly to reach Silver Lake. Despite the long journey, he began treating burn victims as soon as he arrived, and continued without rest until everyone had been seen. The fire was widely reported, and Daly's efforts to reach and treat the victims earned statewide recognition and many admirers.

Daly also played a very important role in the economic development of Lake County. In 1897, he organized and opened the Bank of Lakeview. He established the 7T ranch in the North Warner Valley east of Lakeview near Plush, Oregon. The ranch eventually became one of the largest livestock suppliers in the county. When Lakeview's downtown area was destroyed by fire in May 1900, Daly financed the city's reconstruction. He also helped bring the Nevada-California-Oregon Railroad to Lakeview in 1912.

Education was always important to Daly. He served on both local and state education boards. He was a member of the Lake County school board from 1889 to 1915. He also served on the Oregon State Agricultural College board of regents from 1898 to 1906.

Daly died on 4 January 1920 in Livermore, California while en route to a San Francisco hospital for treatment of a heart condition. He was buried in Lakeview. Over six hundred citizens attended his funeral. At the time of his death, Daly had financial interests in numerous enterprises throughout Lake County. He was the largest stockholder in the Bank of Lakeview. He owned the largest ranch in south-central Oregon as well as a number of other businesses and at least 14 buildings in downtown Lakeview. All together his partnerships and investments brought the value of his estate to almost $1,000,000 (equivalent to $16,071,000 in 2025, a very large sum in 1920.

== Politics ==
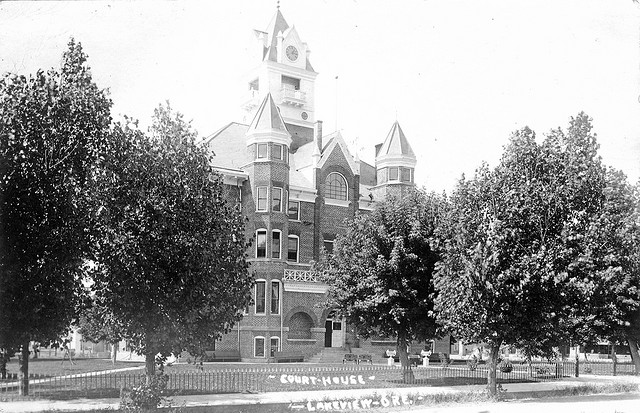
Lake County courthouse built by Judge Daly in 1909

Daly, a lifelong Democrat, was active in Oregon politics for almost thirty years and was elected to numerous offices. In 1892, he was elected to the Oregon House of Representatives representing Lake, Klamath, and Crook counties. (At that time, Crook County covered all of central Oregon including what is now Deschutes and Jefferson counties.) The Oregonian's Handbook, published in 1894, noted that Daly was elected by a "most flattering majority." Despite the fact that Republicans dominated the legislature, Daly quickly became one of its most respected members, well known for his support of education. He was elected to the Oregon State Senate in 1896. During his tenure in the legislature, Daly earned a reputation as one of the Democratic Party's most progressive leaders. In 1897, he was the Democratic Party's nominee for an open United States Senate seat, but the Republican-controlled legislature selected Republican Joseph Simon. He ran for Congress in 1900, but was defeated in a close race by Thomas H. Tongue.

Though Lake County was a Republican stronghold, Daly was easily elected County Judge in 1902, a position he continued to hold through 1914. During his tenure as Lake County's chief executive, the county built a new court house in 1909 using tax revenue from land left by the defunct Oregon Central Military Wagon Road Company. In 1916, Lake County became the first county in eastern Oregon to issue bonds for highway construction. When the bonds failed to sell as expected, Daly bought the remaining bonds himself. Since the bonds paid six percent interest, it was a good investment as well as a savvy political move.

When the Oregon state legislature was considering creating a new circuit court district to serve Lake County, it seemed that everyone assumed Daly would be appointed to the new position. However, circuit court judges were required to be members of the Oregon State Bar and Daly had no formal legal training. To remedy this problem, the Oregon Supreme Court directed Henry L. Benson, a circuit judge from Klamath Falls and friend of Daly's, to oversee a one-man bar examination. Benson chose to conduct the examination over dinner at the Baldwin Hotel in Klamath Falls. A few days after having dinner with Daly, Benson sent a report to the clerk of the Oregon Supreme Court informing him that Daly had passed the bar examination. Based on Benson's recommendation, Daly was admitted to the Oregon State Bar. When the legislature created the new judicial district in 1915, Daly was appointed to the new circuit court position. Beginning on 23 February 1915, Daly served as the state circuit court judge for Lake County. A position he held until 1918.

== Legacy ==
As early as 1888, Daly began actively encouraging young people to apply for college. When families could not afford the tuition, Daly quietly paid the bill. When he died, Daly gave his fortune to the people of Lake County in the form of the Bernard Daly Educational Fund. Daly wrote in his will:

It is my earnest desire to help, aid and assist worthy and ambitious young men and women of my beloved county of Lake, to acquire a good education, so that they may be better fitted and qualified to appreciate and help to preserve the laws and constitution of this free country, defend its flag, and by their conduct as good citizens reflect honor on Lake county and the state of Oregon.

The fact that his will specifically directed that Daly scholarships be granted to women as well as men was very progressive for that era.

Today, the education fund Daly established is the oldest continuously operating place-based college scholarship in the United States. Each year, approximately 40 graduates of Lake County high schools receive Daly scholarships. To date, well over two thousand students from Lakeview and other Lake County communities have used Bernard Daly's generous scholarships to attend college.

Daly's legacy is still widely recognized. In 2008, Republican Senator Gordon Smith and Democratic Senator Ron Wyden jointly sponsored a bill to rename the Lakeview post office building in Daly's honor. The bill was passed by both houses of the United States Congress and signed by the President of the United States on 7 October 2008, officially designating Lakeview's post office as the Doctor Bernard Daly Post Office Building.
