= Goose Lake State Recreation Area =

State recreation area in Oregon, USA

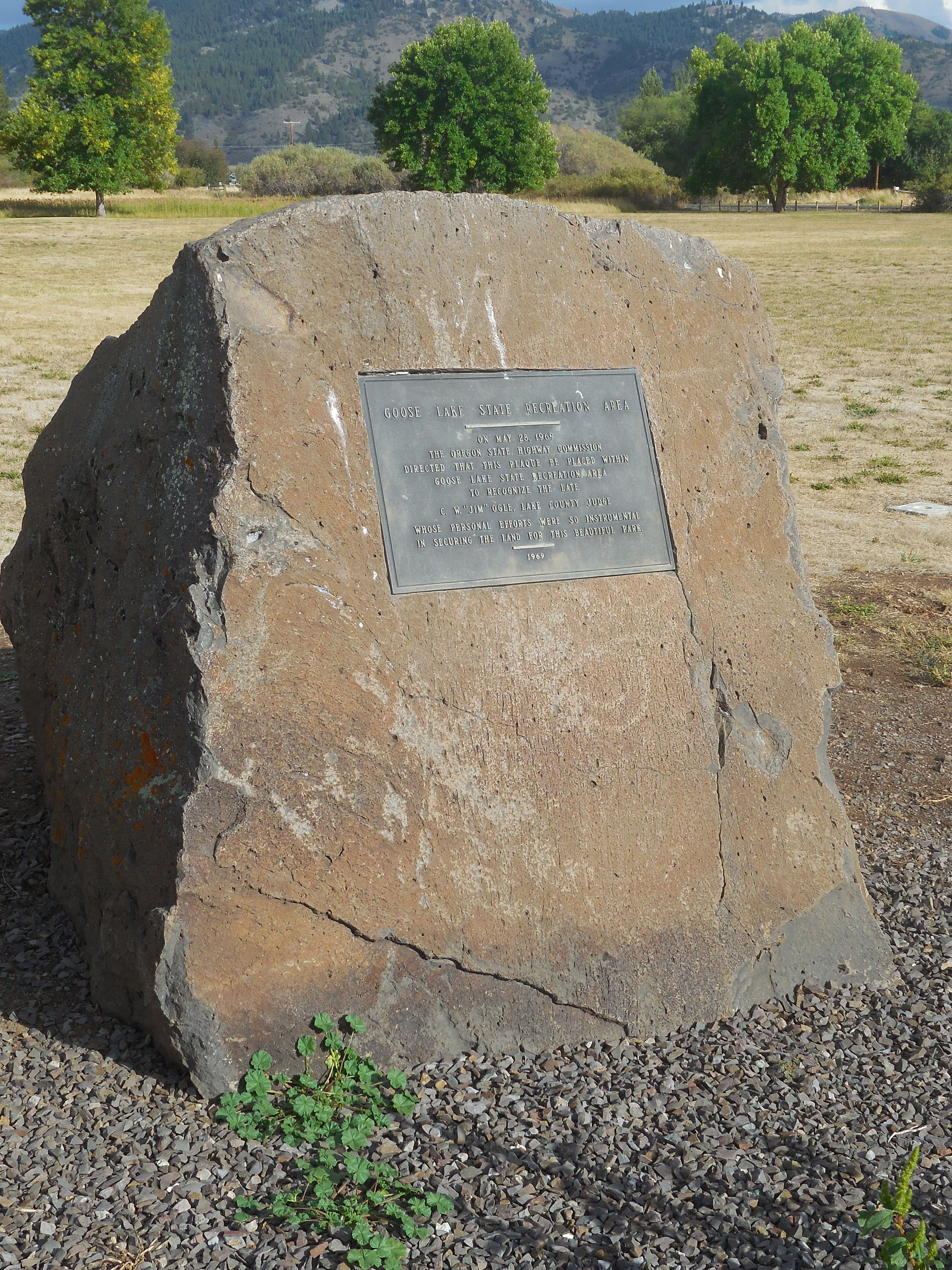
- Memorial plaque at Goose Lake State Park

- Location within Oregon Location within the United States
- Type: Recreation Area
- Location: Lake County, Oregon
- Nearest city: Lakeview
- Coordinates: 41°59′40″N 120°19′24″W
- Operator: Oregon Parks and Recreation Department
- Open: April to October (camping)

Goose Lake State Recreation Area is located on Stateline Road, between New Pine Creek, Oregon and Goose Lake in Lake County, Oregon. It is on the east side of Goose Lake, on the Oregon–California border, and the recreation area offers seasonal camping from May 1 to October 31.
