= Silver Lake, Oregon =

Unincorporated community in the state of Oregon, United States

- Census-designated place
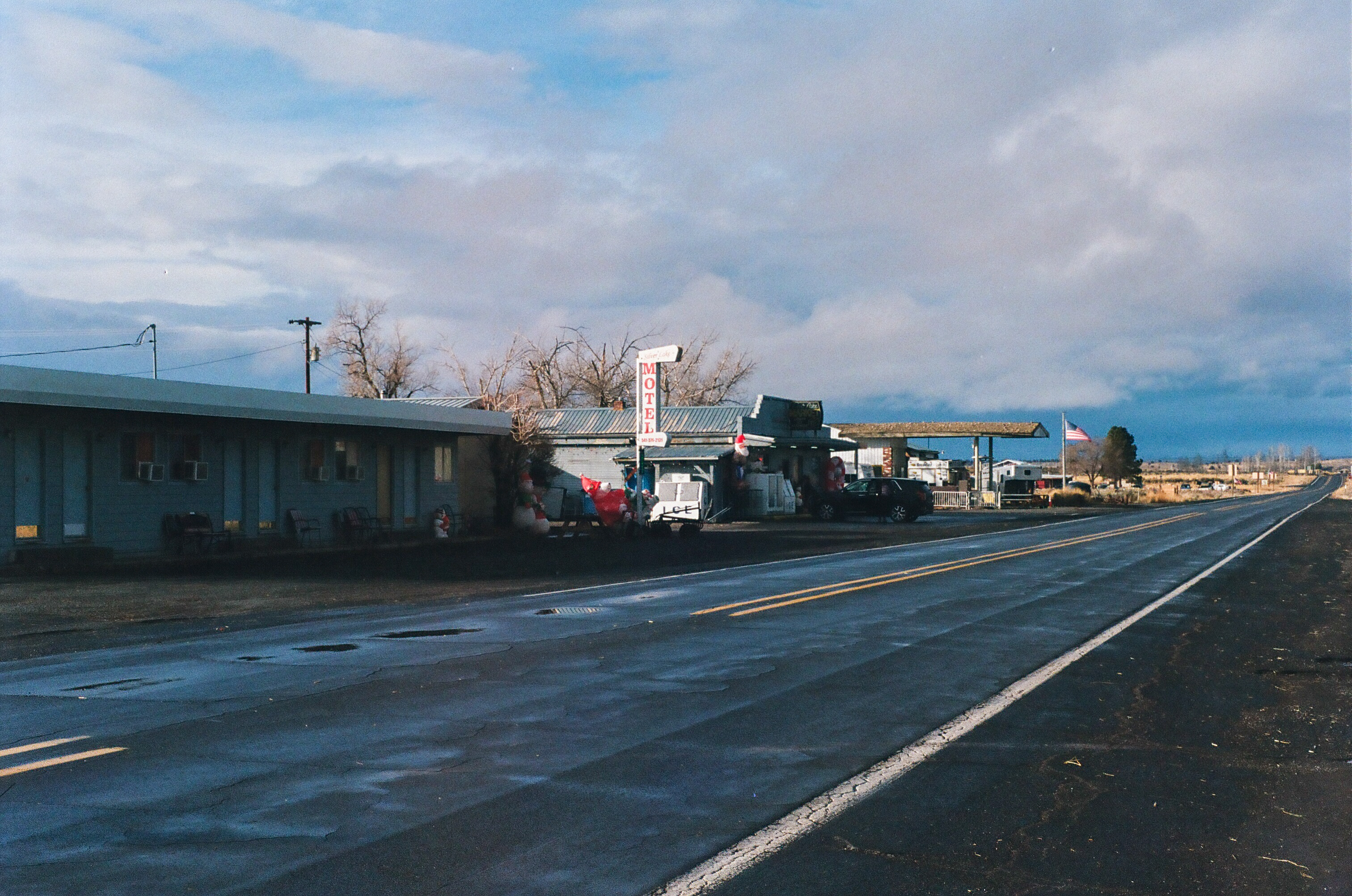
- Silver Lake

- Location within Oregon Location within the United States
- Coordinates: 43°07′35″N 121°02′58″W
- Country: United States
- State: Oregon
- County: Lake
- Established: December 9, 1875

Area
  - Total: 1.48 sq mi (3.83 km^{2})
  - Land: 1.48 sq mi (3.83 km^{2})
  - Water: 0 sq mi (0.00 km^{2})
- Elevation: 4,354 ft (1,327 m)

Population (2020)
  - Total: 159
  - Density: 107.5/sq mi (41.52/km^{2})
- Time zone: UTC-8 (Pacific (PST))
  - Summer (DST): UTC-7 (PDT)
- ZIP code: 97638
- FIPS code: 41-67600
- GNIS feature ID: 2611778

Silver Lake is an unincorporated community and census-designated place in western Lake County, Oregon, United States, along Oregon Route 31. As of the 2020 census, Silver Lake had a population of 159. Facilities include a gas station and a small store, a post office, and a public school, North Lake School, serving grades K-12.

== History ==
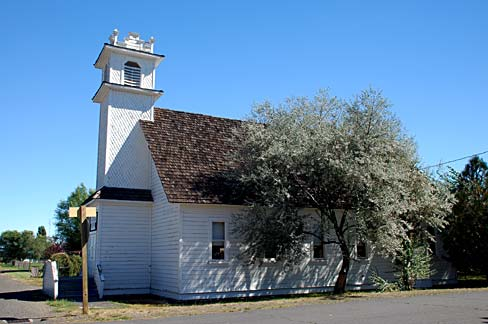
Community church in Silver Lake

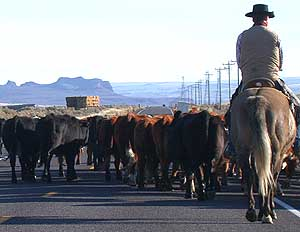
Cowboy herding cattle on Highway 31 near Silver Lake

The community of Silver Lake is located in the high desert of central Oregon. The town is named for a lake of the same name that is 6 miles (10 km) east of town. On December 9, 1875, the post office was established. The post office location has moved at least twice, depending on where the house of the postmaster was at the time.

According to Oregon Geographic Names, "The most important happening in the history of the community was a fire that occurred on December 24, 1894, in which 43 people lost their lives in the burning of one building." A fire broke out at a Christmas Eve celebration inside the crowded second-floor hall above a store. Ed O'Farrell rode 100 miles (160 km) to Lakeview for medical help. After receiving the message, Doctor Bernard Daly drove his buggy over bad winter roads for 24 hours to reach Silver Lake. Doctor Daly's efforts to reach and treat the victims earned statewide recognition.

North Lake School in Silver Lake serves approximately 260 students from the towns of Silver Lake, Christmas Valley, and Fort Rock and consists of a single K-12 school building, which opened in 1991.

Sparsely populated, but seeing an increase as Bend grows, the area is ideal for those interested in the outdoors; hunting, fishing, hiking, camping, skiing, and bird watching are favorite activities of local residents. Wildlife is abundant in the area, such as mule deer, pronghorn antelope, elk, coyotes, badgers, eagles, and hawks.

== Climate ==
This region experiences warm (but not hot) and dry summers, with no average monthly temperatures above 71.6 °F (22.0 °C). According to the Köppen Climate Classification system, Silver Lake has a warm-summer Mediterranean climate, abbreviated "Csb" on climate maps.

Climate data for Silver Lake Ranger Station, Oregon (1991–2020 normals, extremes 1968–2020)
Month	Jan	Feb	Mar	Apr	May	Jun	Jul	Aug	Sep	Oct	Nov	Dec	Year
Record high °F (°C)	65 (18)	74 (23)	76 (24)	85 (29)	92 (33)	100 (38)	105 (41)	102 (39)	99 (37)	90 (32)	78 (26)	62 (17)	105 (41)
Mean daily maximum °F (°C)	40.4 (4.7)	44.5 (6.9)	50.5 (10.3)	56.1 (13.4)	65.8 (18.8)	74.0 (23.3)	85.4 (29.7)	84.3 (29.1)	76.1 (24.5)	62.5 (16.9)	47.6 (8.7)	37.7 (3.2)	60.4 (15.8)
Daily mean °F (°C)	30.1 (−1.1)	33.2 (0.7)	37.3 (2.9)	41.9 (5.5)	50.0 (10.0)	56.7 (13.7)	65.4 (18.6)	63.5 (17.5)	55.8 (13.2)	45.7 (7.6)	35.4 (1.9)	28.2 (−2.1)	45.3 (7.4)
Mean daily minimum °F (°C)	19.9 (−6.7)	22.0 (−5.6)	24.1 (−4.4)	27.7 (−2.4)	34.2 (1.2)	39.4 (4.1)	45.3 (7.4)	42.6 (5.9)	35.5 (1.9)	29.0 (−1.7)	23.2 (−4.9)	18.6 (−7.4)	30.1 (−1.1)
Record low °F (°C)	−28 (−33)	−31 (−35)	−9 (−23)	3 (−16)	7 (−14)	11 (−12)	18 (−8)	22 (−6)	12 (−11)	−5 (−21)	−15 (−26)	−33 (−36)	−33 (−36)
Average precipitation inches (mm)	0.96 (24)	0.89 (23)	1.17 (30)	0.80 (20)	1.48 (38)	0.85 (22)	0.48 (12)	0.38 (9.7)	0.46 (12)	0.60 (15)	0.82 (21)	1.43 (36)	10.32 (262)
Average precipitation days (≥ 0.01 in)	8.1	8.5	7.7	8.4	7.7	5.7	3.8	2.5	3.4	5.7	6.9	9.0	77.4
Source: NOAA

== Transportation ==
Silver Lake is located 79 miles (127 km) southeast of Bend and 103 miles (166 km) north of Lakeview on Oregon Route 31. Silver Lake Forest Service Strip is an airport 2 miles (3 km) southwest of Silver Lake.

== Demographics ==
Historical population
Census	Pop.	Note	%±
2020	159		—
U.S. Decennial Census
