= Drews Gap =

Mountain pass in Oregon, U.S.

- Interactive map of Drews Gap
- Elevation: 5,306 ft (1,617 m)
- Traversed by: OR 140

Third Approach
- Location: Lake County, Oregon, United States
- Coordinates: 42.19927°N 120.615498°W

Drews Gap (el. 5306 ft.) is a mountain pass in the U.S. state of Oregon traversed by Oregon Route 140. It is named for Major Charles S. Drew of the 1st Oregon Cavalry, who surveyed a route from Fort Klamath east to the Owyhee River in 1864 that became the Oregon Central Military Road.

It is located between Drews Reservoir and Booth State Scenic Corridor which is just east of the summit and 12 miles west of Lakeview.
