= Stone Bridge and the Oregon Central Military Wagon Road =

- Stone Bridge and Oregon Central Military Wagon Road
- U.S. National Register of Historic Places
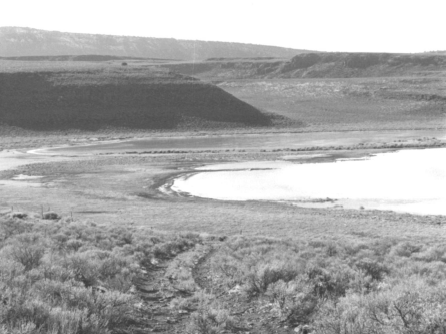
- Stone Bridge during low water period, 1967
- Location: Rural Lake County, Oregon
- Nearest city: Lakeview, Oregon
- Coordinates: 42.35467°N 119.83885°W
- Built: 1867-1872
- Architectural style: Primitive causeway and wagon trace
- NRHP reference No.: 74001689
- Added to NRHP: 1974

The Stone Bridge is a causeway built by the United States Army in 1867. It crosses the marshy channel that connects Hart Lake and Crump Lake in a remote area of Lake County in eastern Oregon, United States. It was later incorporated into the Oregon Central Military Wagon Road which was completed in 1872. The wagon road eventually became the subject of scandal and litigation ending with a United States Supreme Court decision in 1893. The Stone Bridge and the Oregon Central Military Wagon Road were listed together on the National Register of Historic Places in 1974. Today, the Stone Bridge is located on land claimed by the State of Oregon under riparian rights. The wagon road adjacent to the Stone Bridge is owned by the United States Government and is administered by Bureau of Land Management.

== Camp Warner ==
In 1865, the Army decided it needed a fort near the Warner Lakes to facilitate the interdiction of Indian raiding parties passing through the area. Army scouts from Fort Vancouver selected a site along Honey Creek on the west side of the Warner Lakes in what is today Lake County, Oregon. In 1866, a unit of the 14 Infantry Regiment was sent from Fort Boise to establish the fort. The 14th Infantry came by way of Fort Harney, arriving on the east side of the Warner Lakes in late summer. The Army was unable to cross the chain of lakes which stretched more than seventy miles north to south. After several skirmishes with Indians, the soldiers decided to build Camp Warner on the east side of the lakes. The camp was sited poorly and its construction was hasty. As a result, the men had a very difficult winter, losing one sergeant who froze to death during a snow storm.

In the spring of 1867, the 14th Infantry was replaced by a company of the 23 Infantry Regiment. In February, General George Crook visited Camp Warner. Crook directed that the camp be moved to the Honey Creek site west of the lakes. To get the Army's wagons and equipment across the Warner wetlands, forty men under the command of Captain James Henton were assigned to build a bridge across a narrow, marshy channel between Hart Lake and Crump Lake. Shortly after the bridge was begun a second detachment was sent ahead to construct the new fort. The bridge was completed that summer and the soldiers moved into the new camp, which was named Fort Warner.

By 1869, the Indian raids in south-central Oregon had ended and a treaty had been signed. With no Indian raiders left in the area, Fort Warner was abandoned in 1874. While the fort is gone, the Stone Bridge the Army built to cross the Warner wetlands still exists.

== Bridge structure ==
The Stone Bridge was the first large structure built in the south-central part of Oregon. It was constructed between 16 May and 24 July 1867 by forty men from the 23 Infantry Regiment under the supervision of Captain James Henton. The site chosen for the bridge was a narrow marsh that connects Hart Lake and Crump Lake, two large lakes at the southern end of the seventy-mile long chain of lakes and wetlands known as Warner Lakes.

The Stone Bridge is actually a quarter mile long causeway rather than a traditional bridge. It was constructed by hauling basalt boulders and smaller rocks from nearby Hart Mountain and dumping them into the marsh. When it was completed, the causeway was probably several feet above the water level and was wide enough for wagons to pass over it.

The Army abandoned the crossing in 1874 when it closed Fort Warner and left the area. In the meantime, the Oregon Central Military Wagon Road had begun using the Stone Bridge to cross the Warner Lakes. However, the road company never maintained it. After the military road was abandoned, local ranchers used the causeway as a cattle crossing for many years. Eventually, the causeway settled into the soft marshy ground, disappearing beneath the water. Today, the Stone Bridge is completely underwater except during periods of drought. As a result, it is very difficult to find.

== Road construction ==
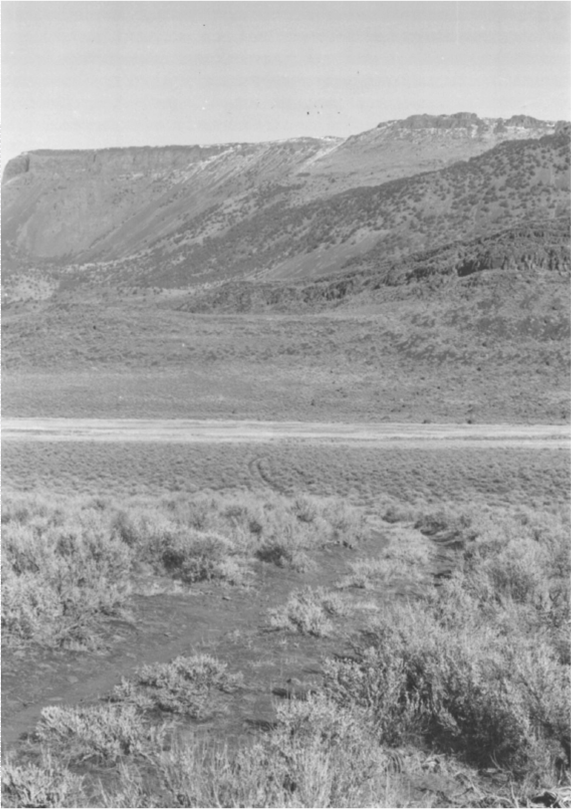
Oregon Central Military Wagon Road

Between 1865 and 1869, the United States Congress awarded land grants to the State of Oregon to pass on to companies constructing military wagon roads. The roads were intended to facilitate the movement of Army units within the state and promote settlement along the routes. Congress eventually authorized the construction of five military wagon roads in Oregon. The first military road was approved by Congress on 2 July 1865. Known as the Oregon Central Military Wagon Road, it was to run from Eugene, Oregon to Fort Boise in Idaho.

The Civil War had drained the United States treasury and the State of Oregon did not have a tax base sufficient to support road construction so the government financed the military road projects with land grants. Private companies were specifically chartered to construct the roads. Congress allowed the construction companies to claim three sections of land for every mile of road they built, every odd numbered section in a swath covering three miles (5 km) on either side of the road. As ten-mile (16 km) sections of road were completed, the companies could claim up to thirty sections of land along the route as payment. Once the tracts were patented, the company could sell or lease the land to recover the cost of construction and create profits for its investors.

As a result, road surveyors laid out routes designed to pass through as much well watered, desirable land as possible. For example, when the Oregon Central military road reached the summit of the Cascade Mountains, it turned south through the upper Deschutes River country into the Klamath Basin to Fort Klamath. It then followed the Williamson and Sprague Rivers, claiming large parts of the Klamath Indian Reservation. The Oregon Central road meandered through the Goose Lake Valley, over the Warner Mountains to Camp Warner (west of the present day community of Plush). From Camp Warner the Oregon Central Military Road went across Warner Valley east crossing north of Beaty's Butte, across the south end of Catlow Valley. The road crossed Steen's Mountain through Long Hollow (near the present day community of Fields) going on to Camp C. F. Smith on Whitehorse Creek. From Camp C. F. Smith the Oregon Central Military Road continued northeast to the Owyhee River crossing (present day Rome)where it connected to an existing wagon road from Winnemucca, Nevada.

== Scandal and litigation ==
On 12 January 1870, Oregon's Governor, George L. Woods, certified to the United States Secretary of the Interior that the road was complete. This allowed the Oregon Central Military Wagon Road Company to claim property along the route. However, most of the Oregon Central roadway was nothing more than a rudimentary trail.

In reality, the Oregon Central Military Wagon Road was a giant scam, designed to acquire public lands at little or no cost to the road company's investors. Nevertheless, the Oregon Central Military Wagon Road Company claimed a total of 875,196 acres (3,541.79 km^{2}) of public land. The company was able to patent 235,568 acres (953.31 km^{2}) before lawsuits ended the fraud. Legal disputes kept the ownership of these lands in question for decades, preventing honest settlers from claiming land grants for farms and ranches. In addition, the company paid no taxes while the land claims were disputed. At the same time, the value of the land and its timber, minerals, and grazing potential continued to increase as the property rights were passed from one investor group to the next. Finally, newspaper reports of the fraud compelled Congress to investigate. This led to a major court case, known as the United States versus the California and Oregon Land Company. That case was decided by the United States Supreme Court on 6 March 1893. As a result, the United States Government was able to reclaim the unpatented lands; however, title to patented lands remained in private hands.

Eventually, the land passed into the hands of the Oregon Valley Land Company, which subdivided it into 14,000 lots and parcels. The property was finally sold in a nationally advertised auction held in Lakeview, Oregon in 1909. The company sold a total of 340,000 acres (1,400 km^{2}). Many of the properties included a separate lot in the town of Lakeview along with the rural land purchase. Many buyers bid on land without actually seeing it. As a result, the company was able to sell thousands of acres of dry, worthless land during their week-long auction. As a result, very few purchasers ever lived on their property or received economic benefits from it.

== Route ==
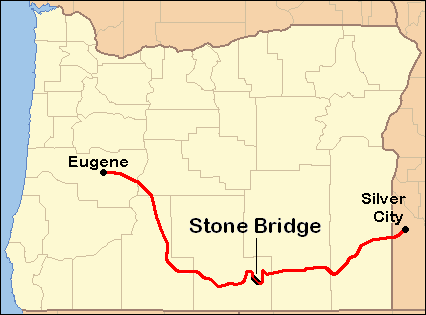
Route of the Oregon Central Military Wagon Road

The Oregon Central Military Wagon Road was a circuitous 420-mile (680 km) wagon trace designed to capture government land grants rather than link destinations. Today, Oregon Route 58 (also known as the Willamette Pass Highway) follows the first leg of the Oregon Central military road from Eugene over the Cascades to Central Oregon.

At that point, the original road headed south through northern Klamath County past what is now the community of Chemult. It followed the Williamson and Sprague Rivers before turning east into Lake County. The road passed over Drews Gap and followed Drews Creek through the north end of the Goose Lake Valley, along what is Oregon Route 140 today.

It then crossed the Warner Mountains and entered the Warner Valley, crossing over the Warner Lakes at the Stone Bridge between Crump Lake and Hart Lake. The road continued south of Hart Mountain, through what is today the Hart Mountain National Antelope Refuge. The road crossed the Catlow Valley and then Steens Mountain. It continued through Harney County, entering Malheur County near the Whitehorse Ranch on the east side of the Pueblo Valley. From there the road follows Crooked Creek northeast, passing near what is now Rome, Oregon. From there it ran along Jordan Creek to Silver City, Idaho.

== Historic Site ==
The Stone Bridge and the Oregon Central Military Wagon Road were historically important projects undertaken by the United States Government and the State of Oregon. Because it is a unique military and transportation history site, the Stone Bridge and an adjacent section of the Oregon Central Military Wagon Road were listed on the National Register of Historic Places on 8 November 1974. Despite this designation, both are very difficult to find. A marker was placed at the east end of the Stone Bridge in 1975; however, the causeway itself is only visible when the water level in the adjoining lakes drops to a low level. Some sections of the military road have become part of Oregon's modern road network while crude dirt roads follow the route in other places; however, most of the original road has completely disappeared.

== See also ==
- List of bridges on the National Register of Historic Places in Oregon
