= Antelope Hot Springs =

Thermal spring in Oregon

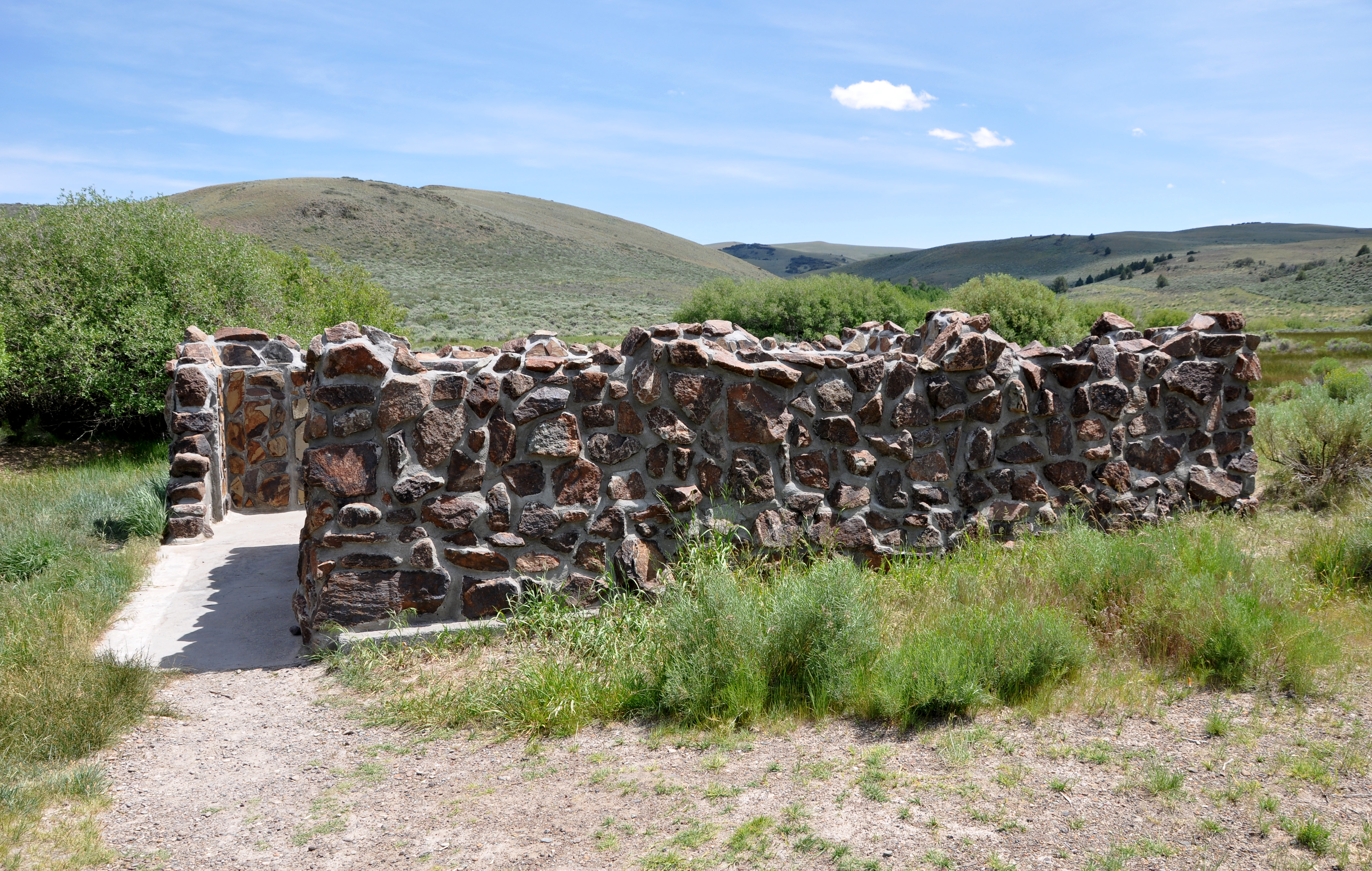
- Hot springs bathing structure on Hart Mountain
- Interactive map of Antelope Hot Springs
- Coordinates: 42.5010°N 119.693°W
- Spring source: aquifer
- Elevation: 5,980 ft (1,820 m)
- Type: Natural hot spring
- Provides water for: flows into Rock Creek

Antelope Hot Springs (also Hart Mountain Hot Springs) are natural hot springs located in southeastern Oregon, U.S. 67.4 miles (108.5 km) northeast of Lakeview and 12 miles (19 km) northeast of the community of Plush, a 28.3-mile (45.5 km) drive.

The springs emerge at 104 °F (40 °C) in a semi-improved, accessible location suitable for camping within Hart Mountain National Antelope Refuge. The pool is about 5 feet deep and 9 by 12 across (150 cm deep, 3 m x 4 m). The pool can accommodate six people. A posted sign requests that nudists lock the door, though one author suggests the remote location renders such formality unnecessary.

Reportedly a rancher noticed some water bubbling from a rock and blasted it with dynamite resulting in a hot spring pool.

There appears to be no official name for the springs, which GNIS refers to only as Hot Springs, and U.S. topographic maps label similarly.
