= Fandango Pass =

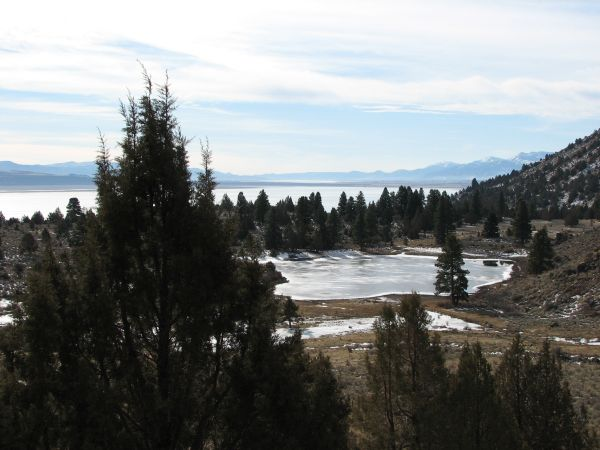
- East side of Fandango Pass above Surprise Valley

- Location within California
- Elevation: 6,135 feet (1,870 m)
- Traversed by: CR 9

Third Approach
- Location: Modoc County, California, U.S.
- Range: Warner Mountains
- Coordinates: 41°48′08″N 120°12′25″W

California Historical Landmark
- Official name: Applegate-Lassen Emigrant Trail (Fandango Pass)
- Designated: July 15, 1956
- Reference no.: 546

The Fandango Pass (previously Lassen Pass; variants Lassen Cut-off, Lassen Horn) is a gap in the Warner Mountains of Modoc County, California, United States. Located in the Modoc National Forest, its elevation is 6,135 feet (1,870 m) above sea level. It is approximately 5 mi (8.0 km) southwest of Fort Bidwell.

Fandango Pass was historically notable for its location as the convergence of two trails, the Applegate and the Lassen, that were traveled by emigrant pioneers between 1846 and 1850. The pass can now be traversed on a 10 mi (16 km) section of graded gravel, 1.5 lanes wide. It is closed during winter storms.

== History ==
The mountain pass was located at a convergence of two trails, the Applegate and the Lassen, that were traveled by emigrant pioneers between 1846 and 1850. The Applegate Trail, originally intended as a less dangerous route to the Oregon Territory, was established in 1846 by the Applegate brothers and Levi Scott, and ran through today's U.S. states of Idaho, Nevada, California, and Oregon. The Lassen Horn Trail was established by Peter Lassen two years later and ran south at Goose Lake towards California Gold Rush mines and settlements. Though the pass was extensively traversed from 1848 until 1853, its importance declined after 1869 with the opening of the Cedar Pass wagon road.

To reach the pass, the emigrants had to cross or bypass Upper Alkali Lake in order to reach the Warner Mountains which is located to the west of the lake. The historic cutoff, part of the California Trail, required passing through Rabbithole Springs, crossing the Black Rock Desert and High Rock Canyon before finally arriving at Surprise Valley, a journey of approximately 100 miles (160 km) of desert travel. From here, the trail climbs steeply to reach the pass, gaining about 1,600 ft (490 m) in about 2 mi (3.2 km). From the summit, the trail descended steeply into the southeast end of Fandango Valley by Goose Lake on the Oregon-California border. The Fandango Pass trail section is visible on the eastern side of the summit.

== Name ==
The pass, known initially as Lassen's Pass (1857 map) or Lassen Pass (1864 map), was named for Lassen by gold seekers in 1849 who followed the route made by Lassen the previous year.

One theory of the name change, from Lassen to Fandango, is that in the 1850s, an Indian massacre may have occurred in the area. The massacre involved a large emigrant train that had camped at the edge of the valley. While the party indulged in a fandango after finding game, grass, and water, it was attacked by Indians. Another theory suggests that Wolverine Rangers camping in the valley found it to be so cold that they burned their wagons for heat and danced a fandango. They named their camp site "Fandango Valley". Later pioneers who passed the area and saw burned wagons deduced that an Indian massacre had occurred. Fairfield describes an 1858 skirmish between Whites and Indigenous people that occurred near Fandango Valley that resulted in at least 17 Indigenous men being scalped by Whites.

While the valley, peak and pass were named Fandango in the 1870s, a 1949 map, nonetheless, showed the pass as being named Lassen Horn.

== Landmark ==
On July 15, 1956, the Fandango Pass section of the Applegate-Lassen Emigrant Trail became California Historical Landmark No. 546. The plaque marker is located 10.8 mi (17.4 km) east of Highway 395 on Fandango Pass Road (County Road 9). A second marker is located off the road, placed by Trails West.

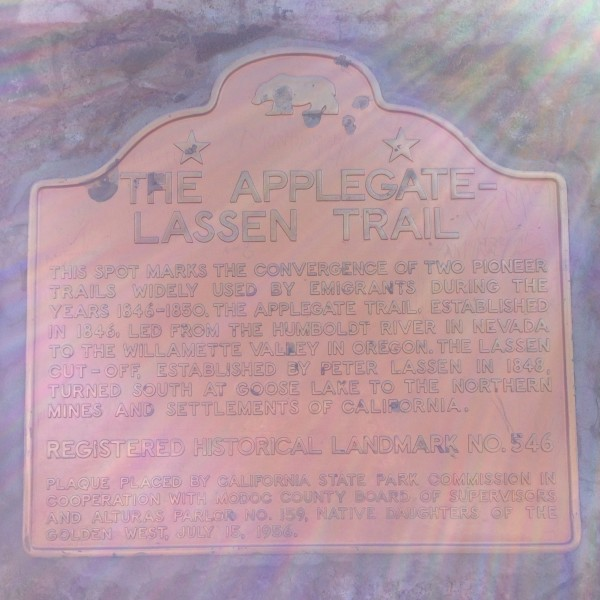
