= North Lake School =

Location
- 57566 Fort Rock Road; Silver Lake, (Lake County), Oregon 97638; United States; 43.244652°N 120.902358°W

Information
- Type: Public
- Opened: 1991
- School district: North Lake School District
- Principal: David Kerr
- Grades: K-12
- Enrollment: 233
- Colors: Red and black
- Athletics conference: OSAA Mountain Valley League 1A-5
- Mascot: Cowboy
- Website: www.nlake.k12.or.us

North Lake School is a public school in Silver Lake, Oregon, United States that serves kindergarten through twelfth grade (K-12). It is the only school in the North Lake School District, which serves Silver Lake, Christmas Valley, and Fort Rock. The current school building opened in 1991.

== Academics ==
In 2008, 67% of the school's seniors received a high school diploma. Of 15 students, ten graduated, two dropped out, and three received a modified diploma.
