= Hunters Hot Springs =

Thermal springs in Oregon

Hunter's Hot Springs
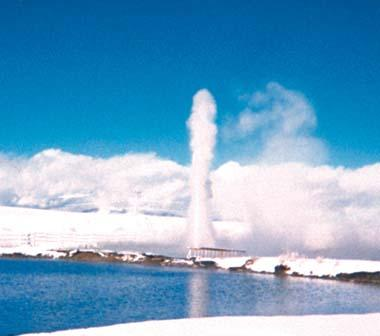
- Old Perpetual geyser
- Interactive map of Hunter's Hot Springs
- Type: Private park
- Location: Lake County, Oregon, US
- Coordinates: 42.22088°N 120.36907°W
- Area: 40 acres (16 ha)
- Created: 1925
- Operator: Hunter's Hot Springs Resort
- Status: Private commercial property

Hunters Hot Springs (often stylized as Hunter's Hot Springs) are natural geothermal springs located in Lake County, Oregon, United States, 2 miles (3 km) north of Lakeview. The springs are named after Harry Hunter, who bought the springs in 1923. The best known feature within the geothermal area is Old Perpetual, which is Oregon's only continuously erupting geyser. The geyser was formed as a result of a well drilling attempt while Hunter was developing a health resort at the springs.

== Springs ==
The hot springs were discovered in 1832 by trappers from the Hudson's Bay Company, who noted in their journal that the water was unbearably hot. They are a small group of alkaline thermal springs in Lake County's Goose Lake Valley, 2 miles (3 km) north of Lakeview. The temperature of the various springs ranges from 185 to 205 °F (85 to 96 °C). The spring water is alkaline with a high concentration of sulfate and other minerals. This environment supports large bacterial mats in the natural channels that drain the springs. As a result, the bacterial mat communities at the hot springs have been studied and analyzed by microbiologists from around the world.

== Old Perpetual ==
The most striking feature at Hunters Hot Springs is a geyser named Old Perpetual. It once released a plume of 200 °F (93 °C) water 50 to 60 feet (15 to 18 m) into the air every 90 seconds. Because of its former regular and rapid eruption pattern, the geyser was one of Lake County's most popular tourist attractions.

The geyser, still heavily promoted by the local Chamber of Commerce as a "must see" destination, stopped erupting for several years after June 2009, possibly due in part to the nearby geothermal development by the Town of Lakeview to supply the Warner Creek Correctional Facility with water for heating. Proposed further development of the site for geothermal power generation purposes threaten the entire hot springs wetlands. As of May 2015, it seems to be regularly erupting again.

== Resort ==
Hunters Hot Springs are named after Harry Hunter, a land developer from Minneapolis, Minnesota who visited the site in 1919 while on a tour of the western United States. In 1923, he purchased the 40-acre (16 ha) parcel that included the hot springs with the intention of developing a health resort. He began by organizing Hunter's Chlorine Hot Springs Club, a business established to develop the hot springs as a therapy, rest, and recuperation resort. The club's first president was H. A. Utley and the resort's general manager was Dr. H. G. Kelty.

As Hunter started to develop the site in 1923, he was not satisfied with the amount of hot water the springs produced naturally, so he had three wells drilled on the property. To his surprise, all three erupted as hot water geysers. Two of the geysers stopped erupting while Old Perpetual continued every 40 to 120 seconds, depending on the seasonal water table level, until 2009.

The original resort building was constructed in 1925. As soon as the facility was finished, Kelty moved his medical practice to the site. A second building was added in 1926. In 1929, Kelty joined four other doctors to open a medical clinic at the site. Together the doctors purchased the hot springs, club facilities and equipment. In November 1929, a restaurant was opened to support their clinic practice.

The clinic was sold in 1943. The new owners built a motel and cocktail lounge to complete the resort facilities. In the early 1990s, the outdoor pool was replaced and a racquetball court was added. New owners renovated the resort facilities again in 2000. Today, the resort operates a motel, lounge, and restaurant. The 104 °F (40 °C) mineral pool is available to guests and the viewing area for Old Perpetual is open to the public.

== Name ==
The springs have long been known as Hunter's Hot Springs, and locals still refer to them that way. The 2000 owner renamed the resort to Geyser Hot Springs, but the USGS only recognizes Hunters Hot Springs and the variant name Geyser Hunters Hot Springs.
