= New Pine Creek, California =

New Pine Creek
- census-designated place
- Location in California
- Coordinates: 41°59′39″N 120°17′50″W
- Country: United States
- State: California
- County: Modoc

Area
  - Total: 2.266 sq mi (5.870 km^{2})
  - Land: 2.266 sq mi (5.870 km^{2})
  - Water: 0 sq mi (0 km^{2}) 0%
- Elevation: 4,843 ft (1,476 m)

Population (2020)
  - Total: 87
  - Density: 38/sq mi (15/km^{2})
- Time zone: UTC-8 (Pacific (PST))
  - Summer (DST): UTC-7 (PDT)
- Area code: 530
- GNIS feature IDs: 1164121; 2583092

New Pine Creek (formerly, Pine Creek) is a census-designated place in Modoc County, California, United States. It is located on the Oregon border, 7 miles (11 km) north-northeast of Willow Ranch, at an elevation of 4842 feet (1476 m). Its population is 87 as of the 2020 census, down from 98 from the 2010 census.

A 1913 book described Pine Creek as being on Goose Lake and having a population of 300.

Despite straddling the California-Oregon border (part of the community is in Oregon), New Pine Creek is not the northernmost settlement in the state of California. A surveying error in 1868 placed the actual border half a mile south of the statutory border (the 42nd parallel). Delegations from California and Oregon held talks on the issue in 1984 after the error was discovered, but did not ultimately change New Pine Creek's status.

== Geography ==
According to the United States Census Bureau, the CDP covers an area of 2.3 square miles (5.9 km^{2}), all land.

== Demographics ==
Historical population
Census	Pop.	Note	%±
2010	98		—
2020	87		−11.2%
U.S. Decennial Census; 2010

New Pine Creek first appeared as a census designated place in the 2010 U.S. census.

The 2020 United States census reported that New Pine Creek had a population of 87. The population density was 38.4 inhabitants per square mile (14.8/km^{2}). The racial makeup of New Pine Creek was 76 (87%) White, 0 (0%) African American, 3 (3%) Native American, 0 (0%) Asian, 0 (0%) Pacific Islander, 0 (0%) from other races, and 8 (9%) from two or more races. Hispanic or Latino of any race were 2 persons (2%).

The whole population lived in households. There were 46 households, out of which 5 (11%) had children under the age of 18 living in them, 18 (39%) were married-couple households, 0 (0%) were cohabiting couple households, 14 (30%) had a female householder with no partner present, and 14 (30%) had a male householder with no partner present. 14 households (30%) were one person, and 8 (17%) were one person aged 65 or older. The average household size was 1.89. There were 28 families (61% of all households).

The age distribution was 11 people (13%) under the age of 18, 3 people (3%) aged 18 to 24, 7 people (8%) aged 25 to 44, 31 people (36%) aged 45 to 64, and 35 people (40%) who were 65 years of age or older. The median age was 59.2 years. There were 44 males and 43 females.

There were 65 housing units at an average density of 28.7 units per square mile (11.1 units/km^{2}), of which 46 (71%) were occupied. Of these, 40 (87%) were owner-occupied, and 6 (13%) were occupied by renters.

== Climate ==
Climate data for Lincoln, California
Month	Jan	Feb	Mar	Apr	May	Jun	Jul	Aug	Sep	Oct	Nov	Dec	Year
Record high °F (°C)	54 (12)	64 (18)	70 (21)	79 (26)	88 (31)	95 (35)	100 (38)	97 (36)	91 (33)	81 (27)	72 (22)	57 (14)	100 (38)
Daily mean °F (°C)	26 (−3)	30 (−1)	36 (2)	42 (6)	52 (11)	59 (15)	69 (21)	65 (18)	56 (13)	44 (7)	35 (2)	26 (−3)	45 (7)
Record low °F (°C)	−15 (−26)	−6 (−21)	7 (−14)	16 (−9)	18 (−8)	27 (−3)	36 (2)	34 (1)	19 (−7)	18 (−8)	−2 (−19)	−17 (−27)	−17 (−27)
Average precipitation inches (mm)	0.4 (10)	0.3 (7.6)	0.3 (7.6)	0.5 (13)	0.9 (23)	0.3 (7.6)	0.2 (5.1)	0.0 (0.0)	0.2 (5.1)	0.3 (7.6)	0.4 (10)	0.8 (20)	4.6 (116.6)
Source: AreaVibes

== Politics ==
In the state legislature, New Pine Creek is in the 1st senatorial district, represented by Republican Megan Dahle, and the 1st Assembly district, represented by Republican Heather Hadwick.

Federally, New Pine Creek is in California's 1st congressional district, represented by Republican James Gallagher.

== Education ==
Modoc Joint Unified School District is the local school district.

== See also ==
- New Pine Creek, OR
