= Goose Lake (Oregon–California) =

Alkaline lake in the United States

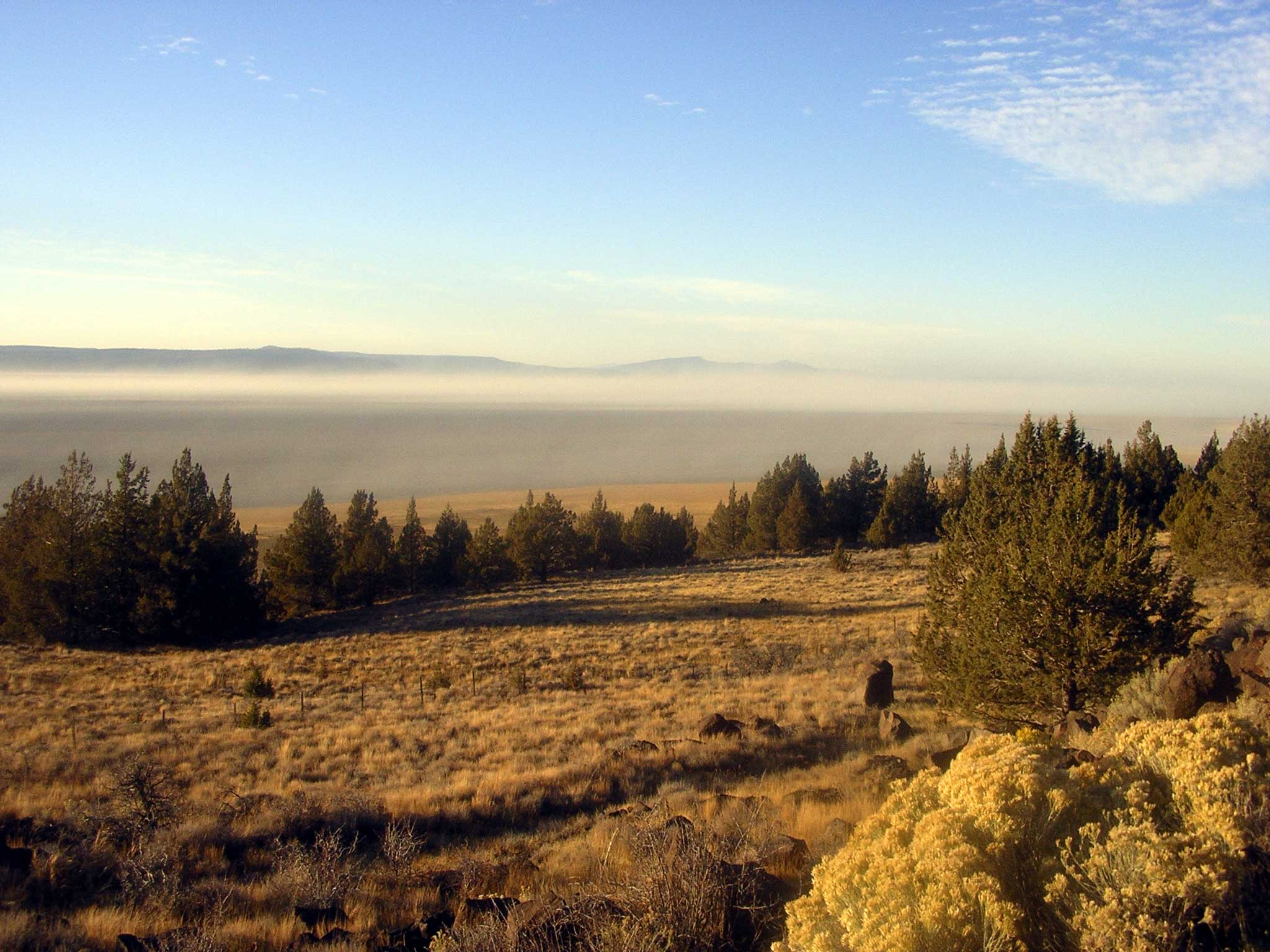
- An alkaline dust storm blowing into Lakeview, Oregon, over the deeper north end of the lake (seen from U.S. Route 395 near Sugar Hill, 2009)

- Location within Oregon Location within California Location within the United States
- Location: Fremont National Forest and Modoc National Forest; Lake County, Oregon and Modoc County, California
- Coordinates: 41°55′0″N 120°26′4″W
- Lake type: Pluvial and alkaline
- Primary inflows: Willow Creek; Thomas Creek
- Primary outflows: Closed basin with rare flows to the Pit River via the Russell Slough
- Catchment area: 1,080 sq mi (2,800 km^{2})
- Basin countries: United States
- Max. length: 42 km (26 mi)
- Max. width: 15 km (9.3 mi)
- Surface area: 147 sq mi (380 km^{2})
- Max. depth: 8 m (26 ft)
- Shore length^{1}: 110 km (68 mi)
- Surface elevation: 1,434 m (4,705 ft)
- Settlements: Fairport, California; Willow Ranch, California
- ^{1} Shore length is not a well-defined measure.

Goose Lake is a large alkaline lake in the Goose Lake Valley on the Oregon–California border in the United States. Like many other lakes in the Great Basin, it is a pluvial lake that formed from precipitation and melting glaciers during the Pleistocene epoch. The north portion of the lake is in Lake County, Oregon, and the south portion is in Modoc County, California. The mountains at the north end of the lake are part of the Fremont National Forest, and the south end of the lake is adjacent to Modoc National Forest lands. Most of the valley property around the lake is privately owned agricultural land, though Goose Lake State Recreation Area is on the Oregon side of the lake.

Goose Lake is the center of a semi-closed drainage basin. Its watershed is normally endorheic, but sometimes flows into the Pit River, part of the Sacramento River watershed, during periods of high water following heavy rainfall or snowmelt. During the 1970s and 1980s, the USGS defined Goose Lake as part of the Sacramento's watershed, but has redefined Goose Lake's watershed as a closed basin.

== Background ==
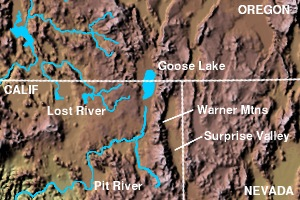
Map of the area

Goose Lake is part of a geological trough which runs from Oregon southward past Death Valley, the Walker Lane.

Goose Lake State Recreation Area includes a campground with various amenities. The park attracts wildlife watchers, campers, and boaters. The campground is open mid-April to mid-October. It is habitat to many flora and fauna including western grebe, long-billed curlew, and a large herd of mule deer which spend much of the time in the 48-site campground.

Recreational activities on or around the lake include kayaking, canoeing, and hunting, but not fishing. When the lake is full, it has a maximum depth of 24 feet (7.3 meters).

The lake is located near the historic Fandango Pass route that 19th century settlers used to enter California. In the mid-19th century, particularly during the California Gold Rush, the Applegate-Lassen Cut-Off of the California Trail left the main route of that Trail near present-day Rye Patch Reservoir, and crossed the Black Rock Desert, on the way to Goose Lake and the California gold fields. The Lassen Cut-Off continued down the Pit River into California's Central Valley, while the Applegate Cut-Off went into southern Oregon along the Lost River.

The lake completely dried up in the years 1851, 1852, 1926, 1929–1934, 1992, 2009, and 2013–2015. Goose Lake overflowed into the Pit River watershed in 1868. Formerly, Goose Lake was the regular source of the Pit River, but water diversion has caused the lake level to drop below its outlet. The Pit River's source is now south of Goose Lake, and the lake's salinity is increasing, threatening fish populations. During rare high water levels, Goose Lake still spills into the Pit River.

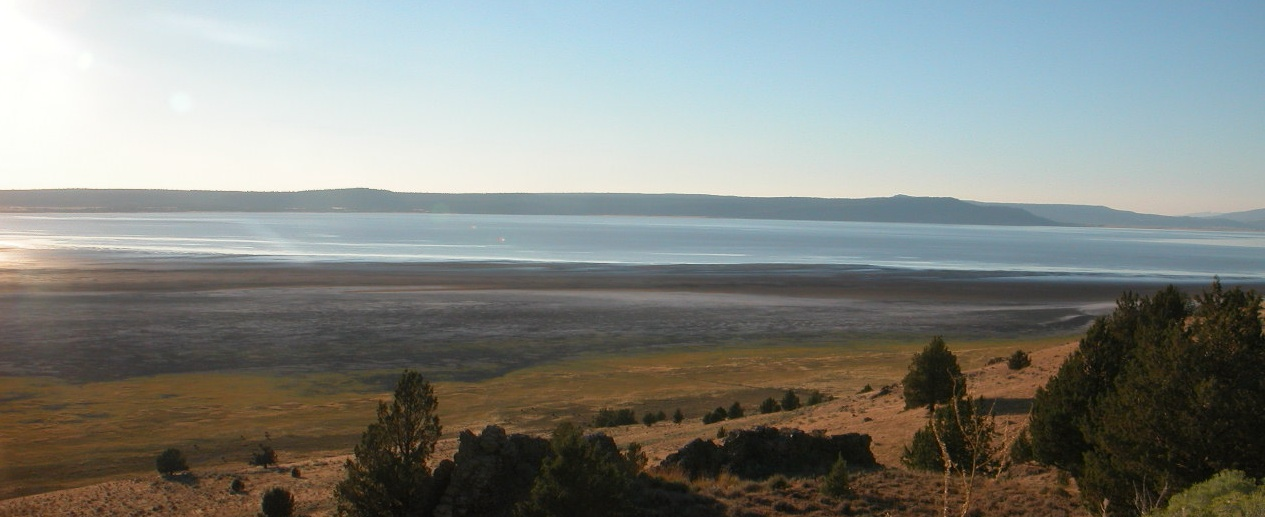
Southern end of the lake

== See also ==
- List of lakes in Oregon
- List of lakes in California

== Works cited ==
- Grayson, Donald K. (2011). The Great Basin: A Natural Prehistory (Revised ed.). University of California Press. ISBN 978-0-520-26747-3.
- Green, Stewart M. (2005). Scenic Driving California (Second ed.). Guilford, Connecticut: The Globe Pequot Press. ISBN 0-7627-3481-7.
