= Fremont, Oregon =

- Ghost town
- Fremont, Oregon in 1915

- Location in Lake County and Oregon Fremont (the United States)
- Coordinates: 43°22′42″N 121°09′12″W
- Country: United States
- State: Oregon
- County: Lake
- Established: 1908
- Abandoned: 1922
- Elevation: 4,436 ft (1,352 m)

Population
  - Total: 0
- Time zone: UTC-8 (Pacific)
  - Summer (DST): UTC-7 (Pacific)

Fremont was an unincorporated community located in Lake County, Oregon, United States. The first homesteaders arrived in the area around Fremont in 1905. The population grew quickly, and the Fremont post office was opened in 1908. By 1915, the local population was declining rapidly due to a severe drought that dried up surface water and lowered the water table in the area around Fremont. Today, Fremont is a ghost town with no population and no surviving structures. The site is located approximately 5 miles (8.0 km) west of Fort Rock state park. The nearest inhabited place is the small unincorporated community of Fort Rock, Oregon, which is 6 miles (9.7 km) southeast of the Fremont townsite.

== Geography and environment ==
The Fremont townsite is in the Fort Rock Valley, in the northwest corner of Lake County, Oregon. The townsite is in Oregon's remote high desert country. The elevation at the site is 4,436 feet (1,352 m) above sea level. Today, the site is located on an unimproved dirt road 5 miles (8.0 km) west of Fort Rock state park.

The town of Fremont was built near several well-known geographic landmarks. To the east, Fort Rock rises well above the surrounding high desert plain with a topographic prominence of approximately 325 feet (99 m). Between Fremont and Fort Rock is a small rock outcropping known as Reub Long Butte. Fort Rock Cave is located at the base of this small rocky butte. In 1938, University of Oregon professor Luther S. Cressman excavated the cave and found sandals, tools, and other human artifacts. Carbon dating showed these artifacts were over 9,000 years old.

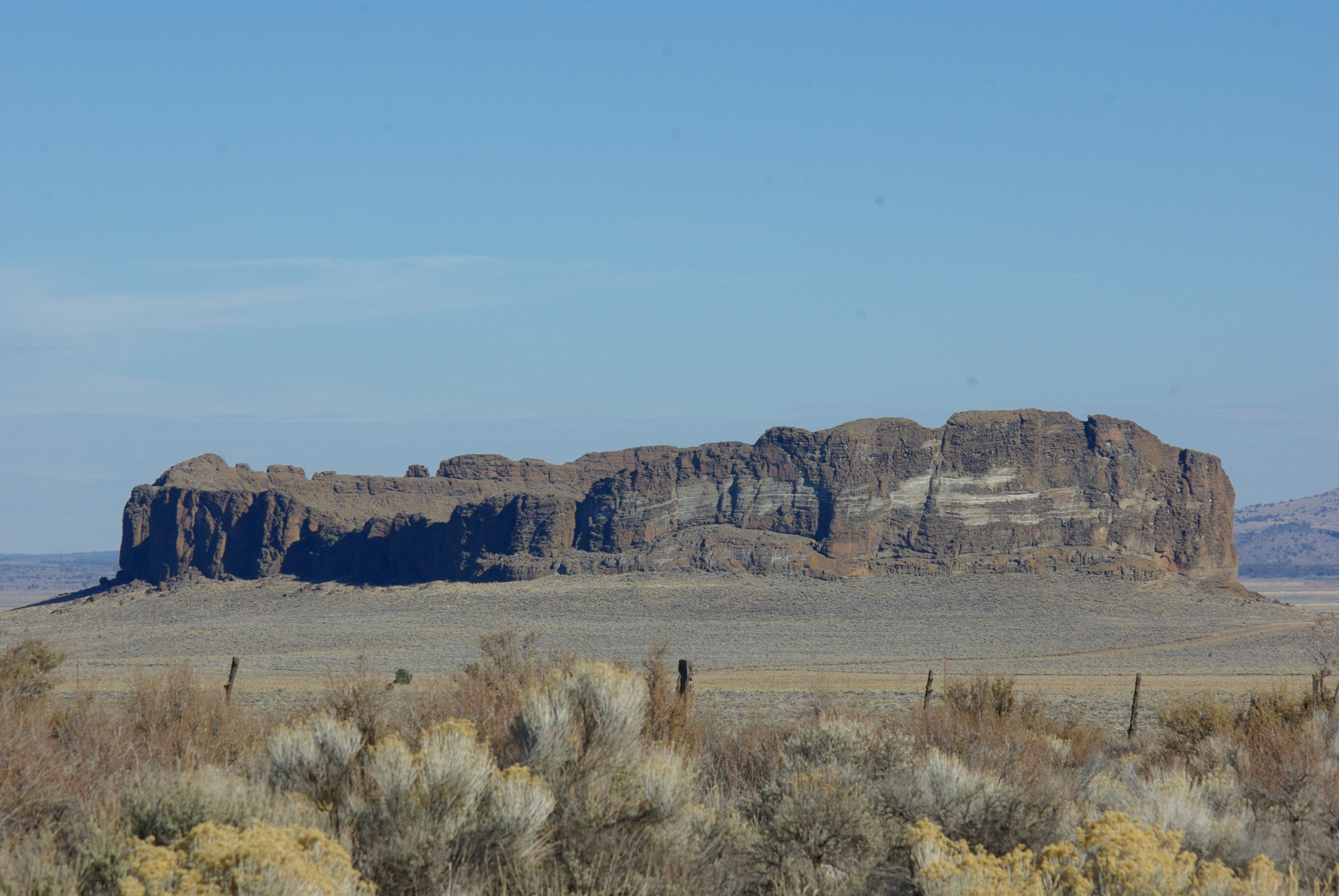
Fort Rock 5 miles (8.0 km) east of Fremont

Another important geographic landmark near the Fremont town site is Hole-in-the-Ground. Fremont is just 2 miles (3.2 km) southeast of the Hole-in-the-Ground crater. Hole-in-the-Ground is a deep volcanic maar created by a series of eruptions followed by ground subsidence in the fractured area. The crater is approximately 4,500 feet (1,400 m) wide east to west and 5,500 feet (1,700 m) across north to south. The rim of the crater is 4,650 feet (1,420 m) above sea level and the elevation at the bottom is 4,340 feet (1,320 m). When Fremont was an active town, Hole-in-the-Ground was known as one of the seven wonders of Central Oregon.

While a federal government report published in 1906 stated that the Fort Rock Valley received 10 to 20 inches (25 to 51 cm) of rain per year, that was not a realistic estimate of the area's normal precipitation. The weather in the Fort Rock Valley around Fremont is dry and hot in the summer and cold and windswept in the winter. Actual weather records show that precipitation in the Fremont area averages only 8.6 inches (22 cm) per year. The average temperature in January is only 25 °F (−4 °C) with a record low of −34 °F (−37 °C). While summer days often exceed 100 °F (38 °C) and the area's record high is 109 °F (43 °C), there is a risk of frost year-round, so the growing season in the Fremont area is short and unpredictable. As a result of the arid climate, vegetation is sparse, consisting mainly of drought-tolerant sagebrush and native bunch grass.

== Community history ==
The first homesteaders arrived in the Fort Rock Valley around 1905. The town of Fremont was established in 1908 at the north end of the valley. The town was named in honor of Captain John C. Fremont, who explored parts of Central Oregon in 1843. Between 1908 and 1915 the Bend Bulletin and other Central Oregon newspapers published numerous articles highlighting the opportunities for dryland farming in the Fort Rock Valley.

The founding of Fremont is attributed to I. R. Fox, who arrived from southern California in 1908. The Fremont post office was opened that same year. By 1910, Fremont was a thriving community. For the next five years, Fremont was a busy commercial center with a post office, school, stores, hotel, creamery, cheese factory, blacksmith shop, and livery stable. The town had a dance hall, library society, band, and a baseball team. During this period, stagecoaches stopped at Fremont daily. On the Fourth of July and other major holidays, people from the local area gathered for community picnics, often at nearby Derrick Cave. The community also hosted dances, horse races, public book readings, baseball games, and band concerts.

The number of new settlers increased dramatically after the United States Congress passed the Homestead Act of 1909. It allowed settlers to claim 320 acres (130 ha) of government land in Central Oregon and parts of other western states. Commercial advertisements extolled the Fort Rock Valley as having rich loam soil capable of growing bumper crops of wheat as well as apples, cherries, pears, plums, prunes, and berries without the need for irrigation. Those advertisements were not truthful; nevertheless, they drew many families to the Fort Rock Valley. When homesteaders arrived, Fremont land locators would for a fee help the new arrivals locate their property in the Fort Rock Valley's featureless sagebrush steppe.

As Fremont grew, new infrastructure was required to support the area's budding economy. In 1909, a new road was built to connect Fremont with the main north–south stage road, now Oregon Route 31. By 1912, the local stage line was transporting settlers from the railhead in Bend to Fremont on a daily scheduled basis. Additional wagon loads of new arrivals often accompanied to stage. At the same time, the Oregon Eastern Railroad was planned to connect to Fremont, but that line was never built.

Even with the new transportation infrastructure connecting Fremont with the rest of the world, local roads were generally very bad, making supplies difficult to obtain in a timely manner. This was a problem for both Fremont's businessmen and local farmers. For example, there is a record of a 1914 purchase of rye seed bought in Burns, Oregon, 120 miles (190 km) northeast of the Fort Rock Valley. instead of shipping the seed by freight wagon cross-country to the Fort Rock Valley, it was sent by mail wagon along the regular mail route north from Burns to Prairie City, Oregon and from there on the Sumpter narrow-gauge railroad east to Baker City, Oregon. It was then sent 350 miles (560 km) west to Portland, Oregon. From there it was shipped by steamer south to San Francisco and then by rail to Reno, Nevada where it was forwarded to Lakeview, Oregon on the newly built Nevada-California-Oregon Railway. Finally, the seed was sent by stagecoach 120 miles (190 km) north from Lakeview to the Fort Rock Valley. In that case, the seed traveled over 1,600 miles (2,600 km) to get to the Fort Rock Valley farmer who ordered it.

Between 1908 and 1914, farm production in the Fort Rock Valley was good due to unusually abundant rainfall. Farms produced wheat, rye, turnips, and rutabagas while local dairy farms supported a creamery and a cheese factory in Fremont. However, a drought began in 1915. By 1917, the drought was acute with only 4.5 inches (11 cm) of precipitation that year. Surface water dried up throughout the Fort Rock Valley while the water table that feed local wells produced barely enough water for farm families' personal use. As a result, farm production declined dramatically and livestock was sold or died.

== Ghost town ==
The drought continued through 1919 and then into the 1920s. This forced homesteaders to abandon their farms and the town of Fremont quickly followed. The Fremont post office closed in 1919. The creamery and cheese factory both closed sometime between 1919 and 1920. By 1921, the town was reduced to one or two stores, a blacksmith shop, and a stage stop station. The last resident left Fremont sometime in the early 1920s. In 1923, a traveler reported that the town of Fremont was deserted. By 1930, Fremont was completely abandoned with virtually no evidence of the town remaining at the site.

Fremont is now a ghost town with no population and no surviving structures. The site has only one remaining artifact, a juniper stump notched with steps. The stair-step stump was originally used by women travelers to mount buggies and horses in a modest fashion. Today, the nearest inhabited place is the small unincorporated community of Fort Rock, Oregon, which is located 6 miles (9.7 km) southeast of the Fremont townsite.

== Climate ==
Climate data for Fremont, Oregon, 1981–2010 normals, 1909–1996 extremes: 4609ft (1405m)
Month	Jan	Feb	Mar	Apr	May	Jun	Jul	Aug	Sep	Oct	Nov	Dec	Year
Record high °F (°C)	82 (28)	69 (21)	79 (26)	84 (29)	94 (34)	101 (38)	109 (43)	102 (39)	102 (39)	88 (31)	74 (23)	66 (19)	109 (43)
Mean maximum °F (°C)	52.3 (11.3)	56.0 (13.3)	64.9 (18.3)	74.3 (23.5)	83.6 (28.7)	90.5 (32.5)	96.3 (35.7)	94.8 (34.9)	89.5 (31.9)	80.0 (26.7)	63.1 (17.3)	53.3 (11.8)	96.7 (35.9)
Mean daily maximum °F (°C)	39.3 (4.1)	43.0 (6.1)	51.3 (10.7)	56.7 (13.7)	67.4 (19.7)	75.6 (24.2)	83.9 (28.8)	84.9 (29.4)	75.3 (24.1)	62.9 (17.2)	45.2 (7.3)	37.3 (2.9)	60.2 (15.7)
Daily mean °F (°C)	26.2 (−3.2)	28.7 (−1.8)	35.1 (1.7)	39.5 (4.2)	47.1 (8.4)	53.6 (12.0)	59.4 (15.2)	59.0 (15.0)	51.0 (10.6)	41.0 (5.0)	30.2 (−1.0)	24.0 (−4.4)	41.2 (5.1)
Mean daily minimum °F (°C)	13.1 (−10.5)	14.3 (−9.8)	19.0 (−7.2)	22.3 (−5.4)	26.8 (−2.9)	31.5 (−0.3)	34.9 (1.6)	33.0 (0.6)	26.6 (−3.0)	19.2 (−7.1)	15.1 (−9.4)	10.8 (−11.8)	22.2 (−5.4)
Mean minimum °F (°C)	−10.8 (−23.8)	−3.4 (−19.7)	3.9 (−15.6)	8.9 (−12.8)	14.0 (−10.0)	20.4 (−6.4)	24.5 (−4.2)	23.0 (−5.0)	14.2 (−9.9)	7.9 (−13.4)	−0.9 (−18.3)	−9.3 (−22.9)	−16.4 (−26.9)
Record low °F (°C)	−34 (−37)	−39 (−39)	−30 (−34)	0 (−18)	4 (−16)	10 (−12)	14 (−10)	14 (−10)	2 (−17)	−9 (−23)	−29 (−34)	−42 (−41)	−42 (−41)
Average precipitation inches (mm)	1.40 (36)	0.92 (23)	0.91 (23)	0.65 (17)	0.88 (22)	0.94 (24)	0.46 (12)	0.42 (11)	0.46 (12)	0.69 (18)	1.27 (32)	1.54 (39)	10.54 (269)
Average snowfall inches (cm)	11.4 (29)	7.5 (19)	5.3 (13)	2.1 (5.3)	0.7 (1.8)	0.0 (0.0)	0.0 (0.0)	0.0 (0.0)	0.0 (0.0)	0.6 (1.5)	4.3 (11)	9.8 (25)	41.8 (106)
Source 1: NOAA (XMACIS extremes)
Source 2: WRCC (precipitation & snowfall)
