= Fleetwood, Oregon =

- Ghost town
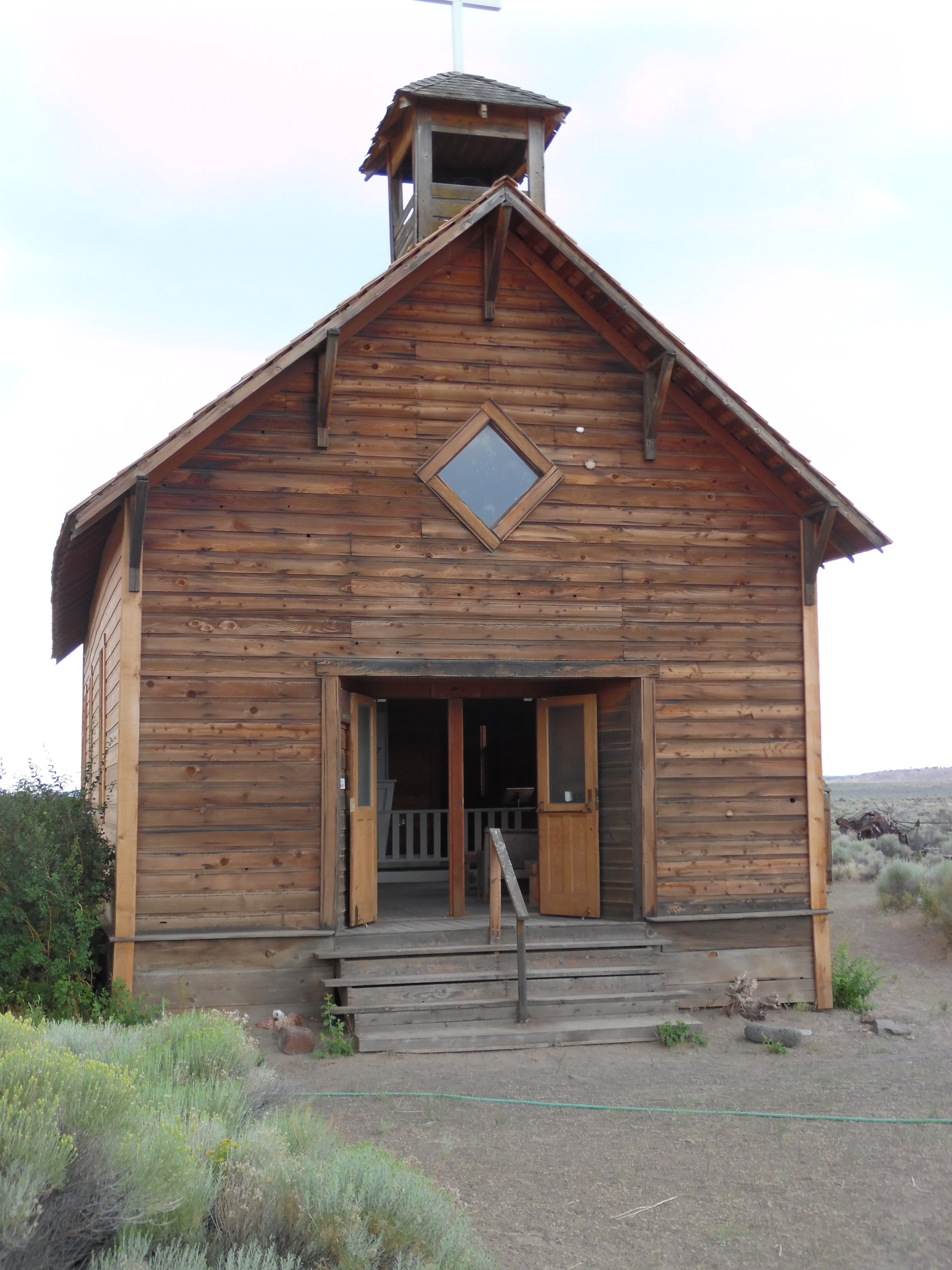
- Saint Rose Catholic Church (later St Bridget's)

- Location in Lake County and Oregon Fleetwood (the United States)
- Coordinates: 43°21′21″N 120°52′27″W
- Country: United States
- State: Oregon
- County: Lake
- Established: ca. 1911
- Abandoned: Before 1938
- Elevation: 4,327 ft (1,319 m)

Population
  - Total: 0
- Time zone: UTC-8 (Pacific)
  - Summer (DST): UTC-7 (Pacific)

Fleetwood was an unincorporated community located in Lake County, Oregon, United States. The first homesteaders arrived in the area around Fleetwood in 1905. The Fleetwood post office was opened in 1913. By 1920, the local population was declining due to a severe drought that dried up surface water and lowered the water table in the area around Fleetwood. Today, Fleetwood is a ghost town with no population and no surviving structures at the townsite. The site is located approximately 10 miles (16 km) east of Fort Rock state park. The nearest inhabited place is the small unincorporated community of Fort Rock, Oregon, which is 9 miles (14 km) west of the Fleetwood townsite.

== Geography and environment ==
The Fleetwood townsite is located in Oregon's remote high desert country. The town was established in the Cougar Valley, a northern extension of the main Fort Rock Valley. Cougar Valley is situated between Cougar Mountain (elevation 5,140 feet (1,570 m)), Table Mountain (elevation 4,600 feet (1,400 m)), and Green Mountain (elevation 5,190 feet (1,580 m)), which together offer some protection from winter winds. The elevation at the townsite is 4,327 feet (1,319 m) above sea level. Today, the site is located on an unimproved dirt road 10 miles (16 km) east of Fort Rock state park.

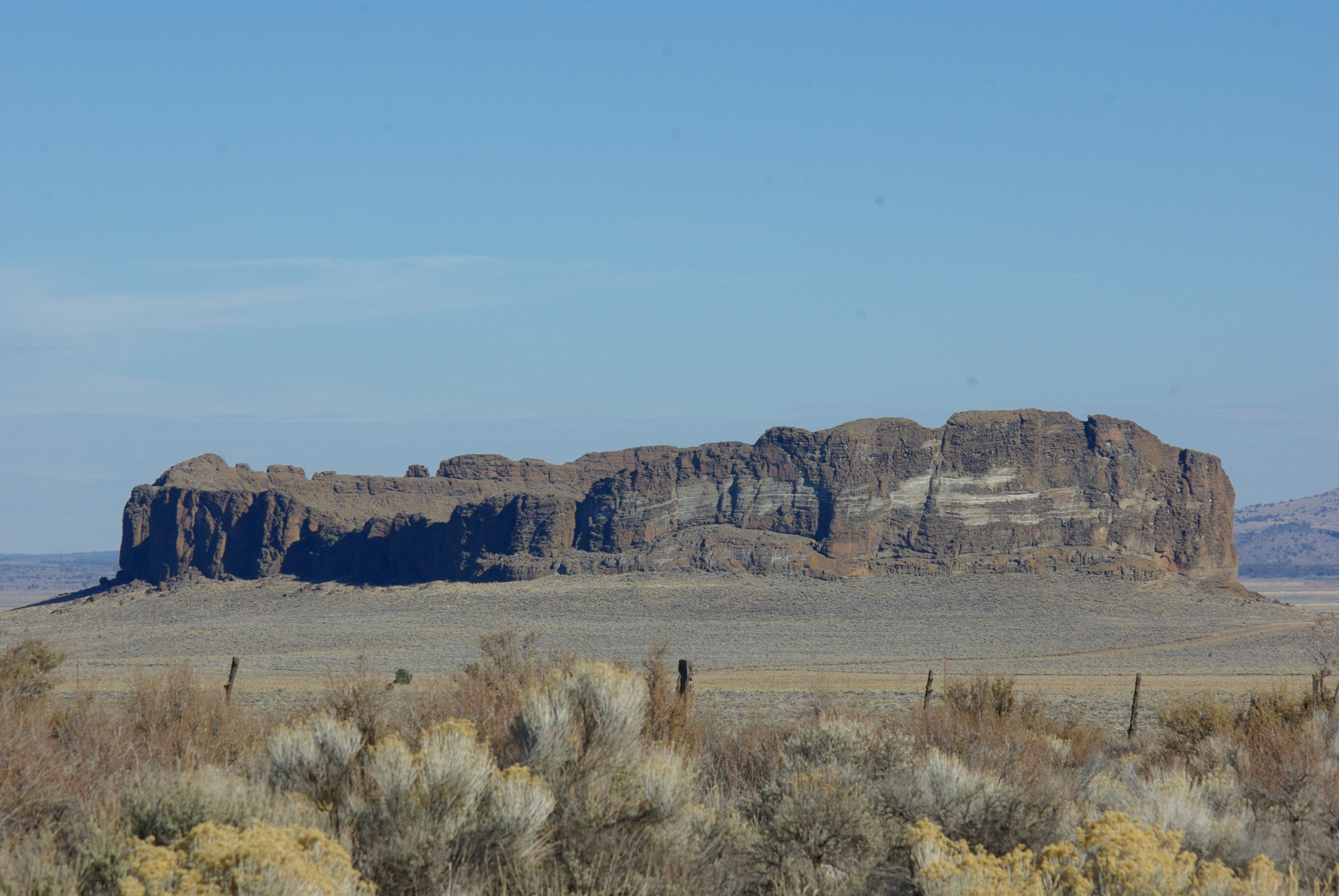
Fort Rock 10 miles (16 km) west of Fleetwood

The town of Fleetwood was built east of Fort Rock, a well-known geographic landmark. Fort Rock rises well above the surrounding high desert plain with a topographic prominence of approximately 325 feet (99 m). Just 1 mile (1.6 km) west of Fort Rock is a small rock outcropping known as Reub Long Butte. Fort Rock Cave is located at the base of this small rocky butte. In 1938, University of Oregon professor Luther S. Cressman excavated the cave and found sandals, tools, and other human artifacts. Carbon dating showed these artifacts were over 9,000 years old.

While a federal government report published in 1906 stated that the Fort Rock Valley received 10 to 20 inches (25 to 51 cm) of rain per year, that was not a realistic estimate of the area's normal precipitation. The weather in the Fort Rock Valley around Fleetwood is dry and hot in the summer and cold and windswept in the winter. Actual weather records show that precipitation in the Fleetwood area averages only 8.6 inches (22 cm) per year. The average temperature in January is only 25 °F (−4 °C) with a record low of −34 °F (−37 °C). While summer days often exceed 100 °F (38 °C) and the area's record high is 109 °F (43 °C), there is a risk of frost year around, so the growing season in the Fleetwood area is short and unpredictable. As a result of the arid climate, vegetation is sparse, consisting mainly of drought-tolerant sagebrush and native bunch grass.

== Community history ==
The first homesteaders arrived in the Fort Rock Valley around 1905. Between 1908 and 1915 the Bend Bulletin and other Central Oregon newspapers published numerous articles highlighting the opportunities for dryland farming in the Fort Rock Valley. Commercial advertisements extolled the valley as having rich loam soil capable of growing bumper crops of wheat as well as apples, berries, cherries, pears, plums, and prunes without the need for irrigation. Those advertisements were not true; nevertheless, they drew many families to the Fort Rock Valley. The number of settlers increased dramatically after the United States Congress passed the Homestead Act of 1909. It allowed settlers to claim 320 acres (130 ha) of government land in Central Oregon and parts of other western states. This was increased to 640 acres (260 ha) in 1916.

The town of Fleetwood was established around 1911 and it quickly became a busy commercial center serving local homesteaders. It was named after Mortimer and Helen Fleet, who operated a store at the location that became Fleetwood. When new homesteaders arrived in the Fleetwood area, for a fee land locators would help the new arrivals find their property in the valley's featureless high desert steppe. Because of the high desert environment, the lumber needed to build structures in the Fleetwood area had to be hauled from a sawmill located in the pine forest 25 miles (40 km) west of townsite.

Fleetwood's school was initially conducted in a woodshed until a new modern schoolhouse was finished in 1912. The new schoolhouse was named Cougar Valley School. It was well built with a large classroom and two adjacent cloakrooms. It was heated by a big pot-bellied stove. When it opened the school had only 7 students. However, the school quickly became an important community asset where people from Fleetwood would enjoy stage productions, music programs, and poetry readings. Attendance eventually grew to 35 students.

The Fleetwood post office was opened in 1913 with Helen Fleet as the first postmaster. By that time, Fleetwood was a thriving community. For the next few years, Fleetwood was a busy commercial center with a store, post office, school, blacksmith shop, stable, and a community dance hall. There were also at least three large homes near the center of town plus a significant number of homestead cabins in the vicinity of the town.

On the Fourth of July and other major holidays, people from the local area gathered for community activities including horse races, foot races, group sing-alongs, literary programs, community plays, band concerts, and baseball games. Because Fleetwood had a community hall, dances were regular events that drew large crowds from a wide area around the town. The dance hall had one big room with a loft above the main floor, heated by a large pot-bellied stove. Amateur musicians from the local area played at the dances which usually lasted until breakfast the next morning.

In 1915, Fleetwood had a population of 40. Despite the small population, Fleetwood had two weekly newspapers, the Cougar Valley Observer and the Lake County Tribune. Everything that is known about the Observer come from one surviving copy of a single 1915 edition of that newspaper that was discovered in 1981. The Tribune is better documented; there are a number of surviving editions from the paper's early Fleetwood period. The Tribune moved to Fort Rock in 1918 and then to nearby Silver Lake two years later. In 1928, the Tribune was purchased by the Lake County Examiner, a Lakeview-based newspaper that still serves Lake County today. Eventually, the Tribune was merged into the Examiner.

In 1918, local Catholics built Saint Rose Church on the outskirts of Fleetwood. The church was constructed on 3 acres (1.2 ha) of land donated by the Belletable family. It was the only building in the Fort Rock Valley constructed during the homestead era specifically for church services. The church was the result of a conflict between local Catholics and a larger Protestant congregation over which group could use the local schoolhouse on Sunday mornings. The church was only used for a few years before the small Catholic parish moved their Sunday services to a local ranch. However, the church was still used for special events. In the 1930s, the church building was renamed Saint Bridget's. The church and adjacent properties were eventually incorporated into the Godon ranch. As a result of it being located on private property, the church was never demolished or stripped for salvage lumber.

Between 1908 and 1914, farm production in the Fort Rock Valley was good due to unusually abundant rainfall. Farms in the Fleetwood area produced rye, wheat, alfalfa, and root vegetables. However, a drought began in 1915. By 1917, the drought was acute with only 4.5 inches (11 cm) of precipitation that year. Surface water dried up throughout the Fort Rock Valley, while the water table that feed local wells produced barely enough water for farm families' personal use. As a result, farm production declined dramatically, and livestock was sold or died.

== Ghost town ==
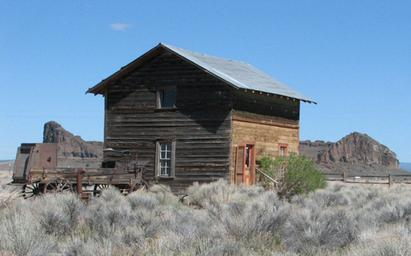
The Belletable family house built in 1911

The drought continued through 1919 and then into the 1920s. This forced homesteaders to abandon their farms and the town of Fleetwood declined quickly. The Fleetwood post office was closed in 1920. Shortly after the post office closed, the Fleet family moved to Lakeview. Two other Fleetwood families left the same week as the Fleets and other families followed their example. By the time the 1920 academic year began, the number of students at the Cougar Valley School had dwindled down to only seven. The school was closed in 1929 and the few remaining students were transferred to another school, five miles west of Fleetwood. A few years later, the Cougar Valley School building was moved to the nearby town of Fort Rock and used to expand the local Grange hall.

By 1938, Fleetwood was completely abandoned. That year, the federal government announced it would buy back up to 225,000 acres (91,000 ha) of abandoned homestead property in northern Lake County as part of the Fort Rock Land Utilization Project. The federal acquisition program bought the Fleetwood townsite along with the valley's abandoned homesteads. This included the dilapidated homestead buildings scattered around the high desert except for a few structures like the Saint Rose Church (by that time, renamed Saint Bridget's Church) that were located on property previously purchased by local ranchers. The land that the government acquired was returned to the public domain.

By 1962, there was nothing left at the Fleetwood townsite except sand and sagebrush. The Saint Rose Catholic Church and the Belletable homestead house, which were both located on the Godon ranch, remained in the Fleetwood area until 1988, when both structures were moved to the Fort Rock Valley Historical Homestead Museum, 9.5 miles (15.3 km) west of the abandoned townsite.

Fleetwood is now a ghost town with no population and no surviving structures at the original townsite. Today, the nearest inhabited place is the small unincorporated community of Fort Rock, Oregon, which is located 9 miles (14 km) west of the Fleetwood townsite.
