= Fort Rock Valley Historical Homestead Museum =

Coordinates: 43.3556°N 121.0585°W

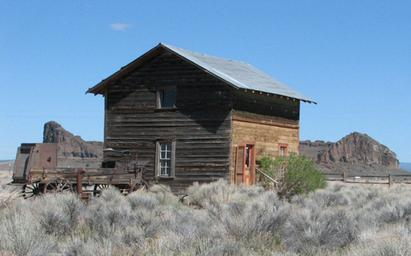
- Belletable House in front of Fort Rock
- Established: 1988
- Location: Fort Rock, Oregon, U.S.A.
- Type: Oregon history
- Curator: Fort Rock Valley Historical Society
- Website: www.fortrockoregon.com

The Fort Rock Valley Historical Homestead Museum is located in Fort Rock, Oregon, United States. Opened in 1988, it is a collection of original homestead-era (early 1900s) buildings including a church, school, houses, homestead cabins, and several other buildings assembled in a village setting. The structures were moved to the museum site from various locations around the Fort Rock Valley, named for volcanic landmark Fort Rock. Most of the buildings contain historic items used by local homesteaders including furniture, dishes, household products, and tools. The museum is open for self-guided tours from Memorial Day weekend through Labor Day weekend.

== History ==
The Fort Rock Valley covers over 200 square miles (520 km^{2}) at an average elevation of 4,400 feet (1,300 m). From 1905 until about 1915, large numbers of homesteaders moved to the Fort Rock Valley to claim Federal lands for farms and ranches via the Homestead Acts. Numerous small towns were established throughout the valley. These included Fremont, Lake, Sink, Fleetwood, Connley, Arrow, Buffalo, View Point, Cliff, Loma Vista, and Fort Rock. However, the high desert country around Fort Rock has hot, dry summers and extremely cold winters. The valley's average rainfall is less than 9 inches (230 mm) per year, the last average frost date in the spring is June 29 and the average first frost date in the fall is July 9. Because of the extreme weather most homesteaders were forced to abandon their claims within a few years. Most of the valley's towns had post offices by 1912, and most of those post offices were closed by 1920. Today, the only two homesteader-era towns that still exist are the small unincorporated communities of Fort Rock and Silver Lake.

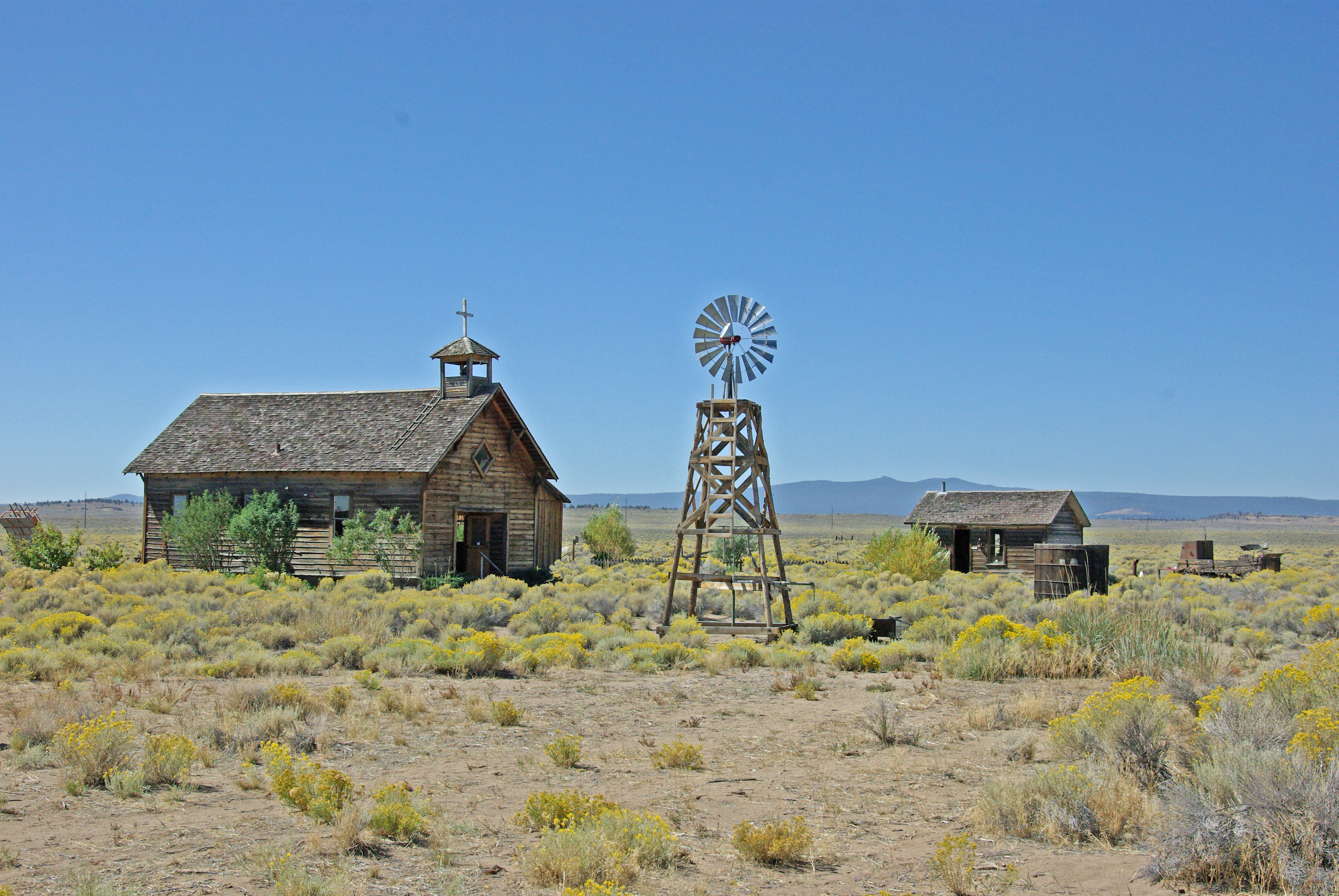
St. Roses church in the Fort Rock Valley

The original vision for the Fort Rock Valley Historical Homestead Museum came from Frank and Vivian Stratton, who both grew up on Fort Rock homesteads. In 1981, the Strattons joined six other individuals interested in local history to form the Fort Rock Valley Historical Society. The society conceived and promoted the development of a homestead museum to preserve the Fort Rock Valley's pioneer heritage. As a result of the society's efforts, the Fort Rock Valley Historical Homestead Museum was opened in 1988 with two historic buildings. Since its opening, the museum has grown significantly, acquiring additional land from the Bureau of Land Management and more buildings from abandoned homestead sites around the Fort Rock Valley. Many of the buildings were considered hazardous and were scheduled to be burned or demolished. The museum's interest saved them from destruction.

== Collection ==
The Fort Rock Valley Historical Homestead Museum docents and volunteers work to preserve, restore, and showcase a living village including an authentic community garden. A seasonal interpretive visitor center and gift shop offers guided tours and independent study of the eleven rescued historic buildings, most of which originate from the Fort Rock Valley. Seasonally evolving indoor and outdoor exhibits of the museum's large collection of homesteaders' furniture, dishes, household products, and tools demonstrate some of the local lifestyles of the period.

- The Webster Cabin was one of the two original museum buildings open in 1988. The cabin was built by Britt Webster. It was originally located about 10 miles (16 km) northeast of Fort Rock. This cabin was used as a home until 1986.
- The Sunset School is the only remaining pioneer schoolhouse of twenty built in the Fort Rock Valley. It was moved to Fort Rock to serve as a community church. When a new church was built the building was donated to the museum in 1998.
- The Fred Stratton Home is the childhood home of Frank Stratton one of the museum's founders. It was moved to the museum site from a ranch near Fort Rock where it was used as storage shed. The house was originally located about 6 miles (10 km) south of the Fort Rock.
- St. Roses Catholic Church was the only church built in the Fort Rock Valley during the homestead years. It was moved to the museum site from its original location approximately 12 miles (19 km) northeast of Fort Rock.
- The Belletable House is believed to be the largest pioneer home built in the valley. It was originally located near the St. Roses Church northeast of Fort Rock. The museum used the building as its visitor center until modern visitor center and gift shop was built.
- The Bodenheimer House was one of a few two story houses in the valley. It was built by a German carpenter, but was only lived in briefly by its builder.
- The Menkenmair Cabin is the only remaining log cabin in the valley. The original owners died shortly after completing the cabin leaving two orphan children who were raised by neighbors.
- Along with the Webster Cabin, Dr. Thom's office was one of the two original museum buildings. Dr. James W. Thom was the valley's only doctor during the homestead period. His office was located in Silver Lake, 17 miles (27 km) south of Fort Rock.
- The Land Office is a log structure typical of the homestead period. However, it is not original to the Fort Rock Valley. The Fort Rock Historical Society rescued the building from a development site near Bend, Oregon.
- The Fort Rock General Store originally stood 2 blocks east of the museum. It survived a disastrous 1960s fire and was moved out of town to serve first as a residence and then as a furniture repair shop. When donated to the Fort Rock Valley Historical Society in 2009 it was a loafing shed for horses. After considerable cleaning and refurbishing to match photos of the original store interior, it is stocked with dry goods and equipment of the homestead era. The metal sign on the building is original. A freight dock was added to match photos of the original, which has a hand-powered visible gasoline pump resembling one from a 1922 photo of this homestead commercial building.
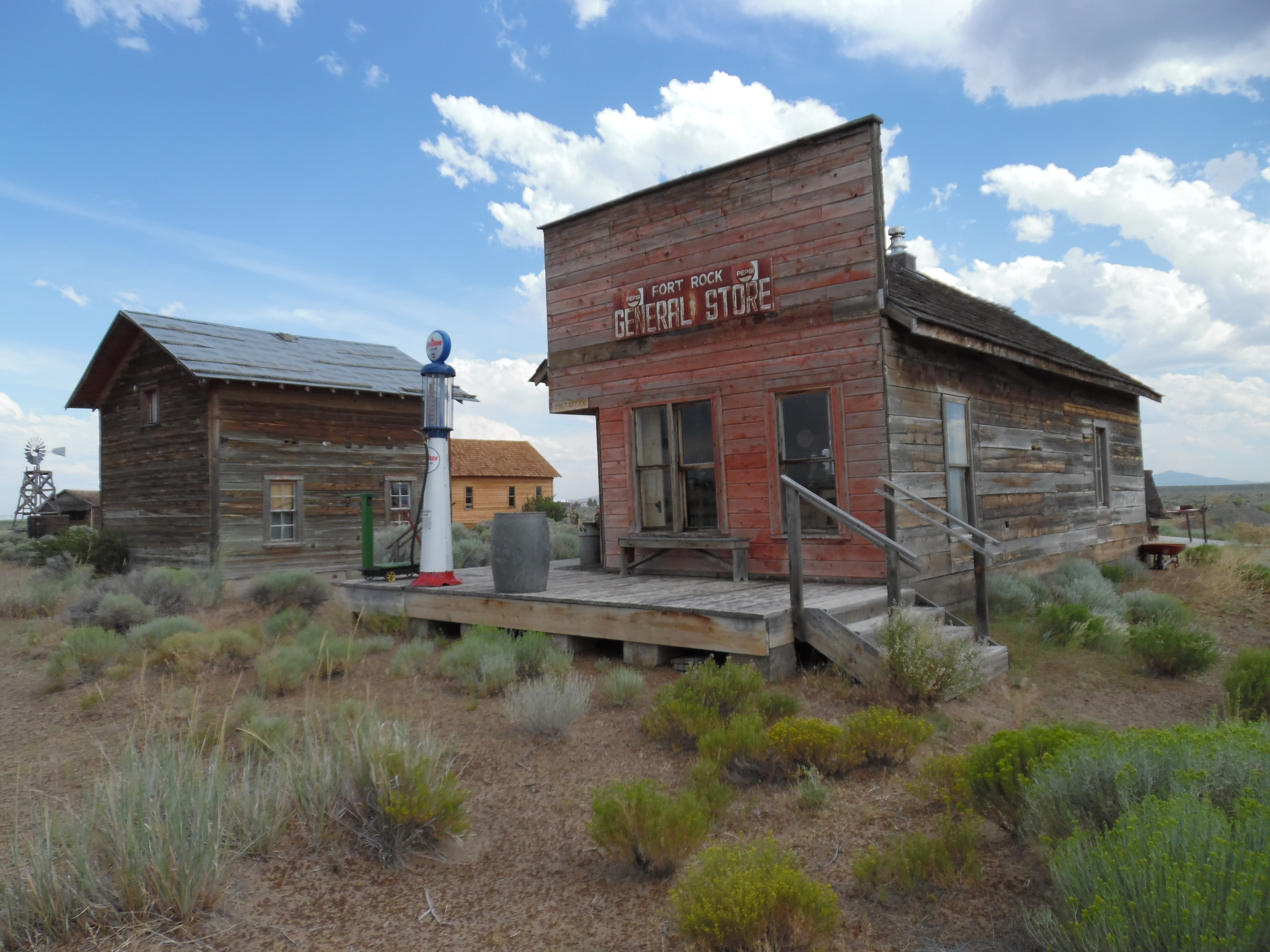
*Old Fort Rock Store

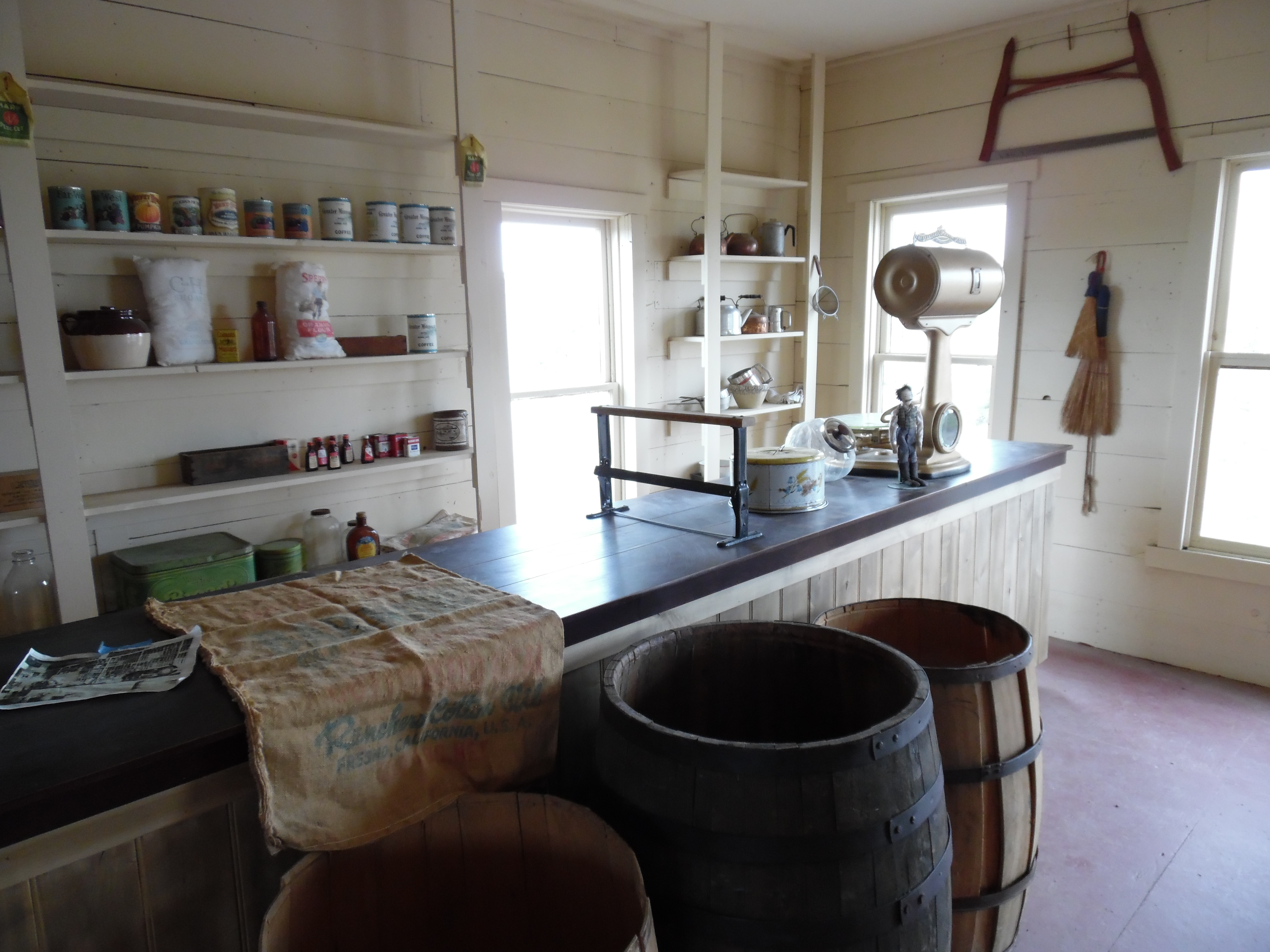
*Inside general store

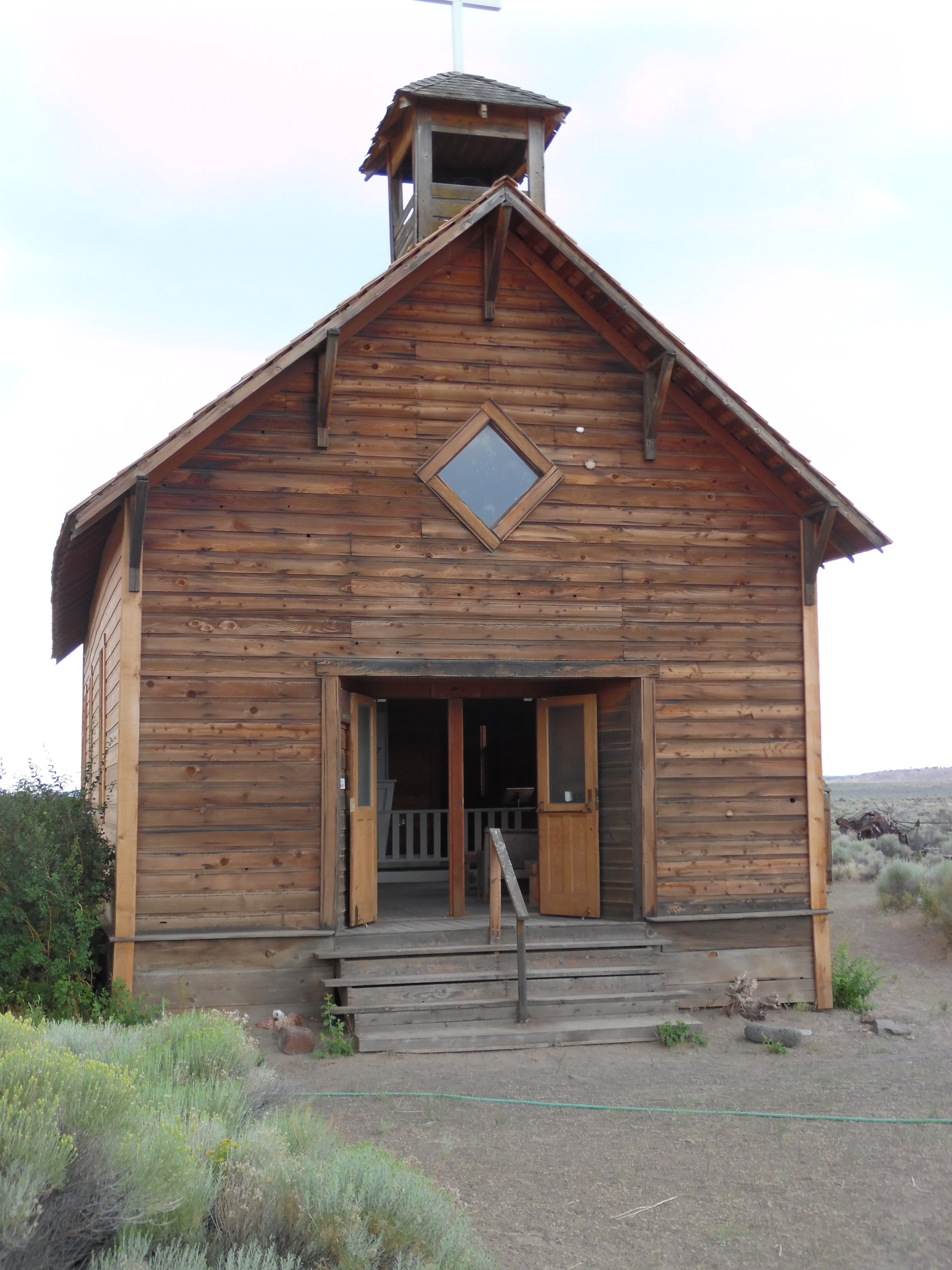
*St. Roses Church

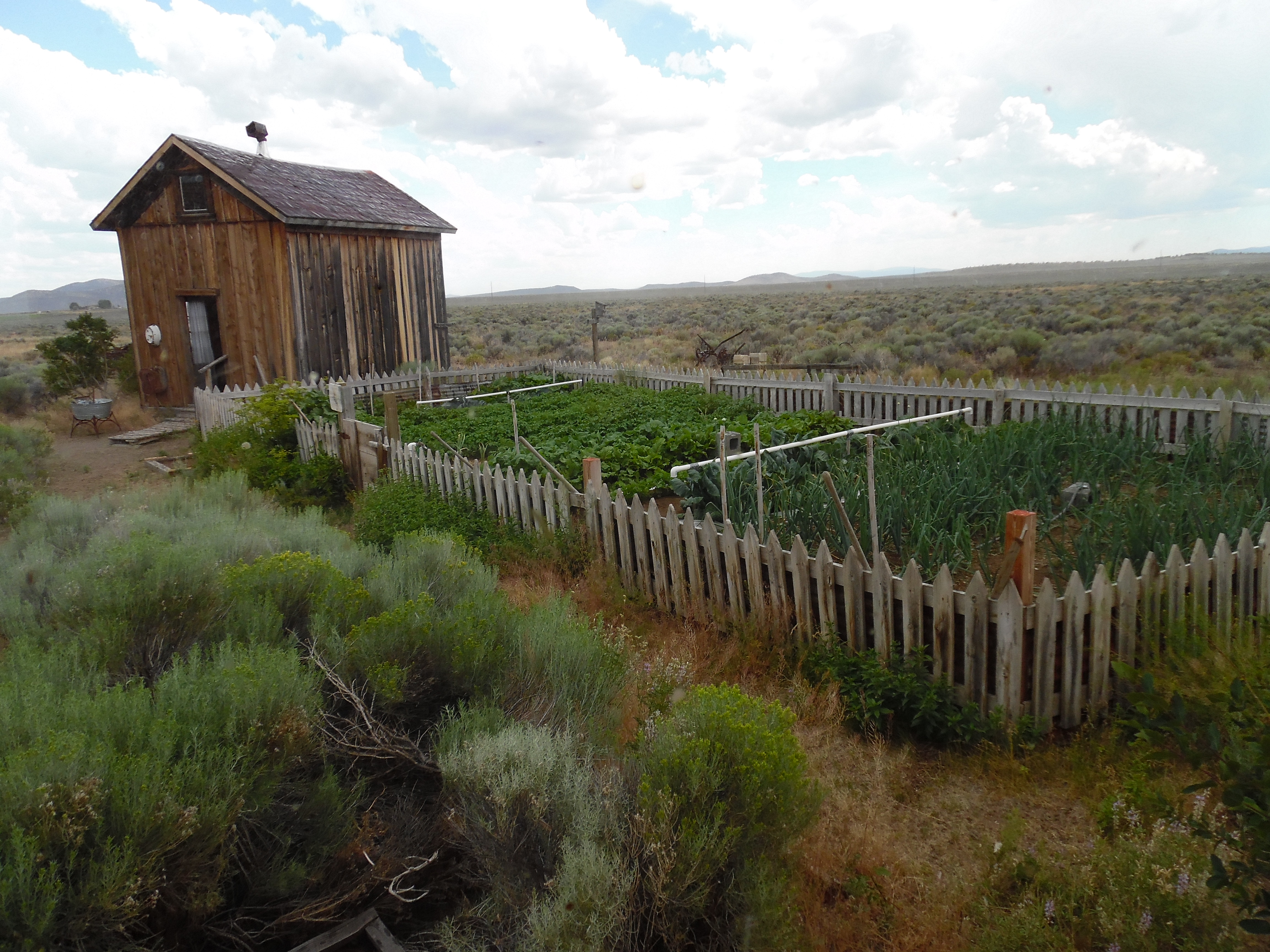
*Homestead garden

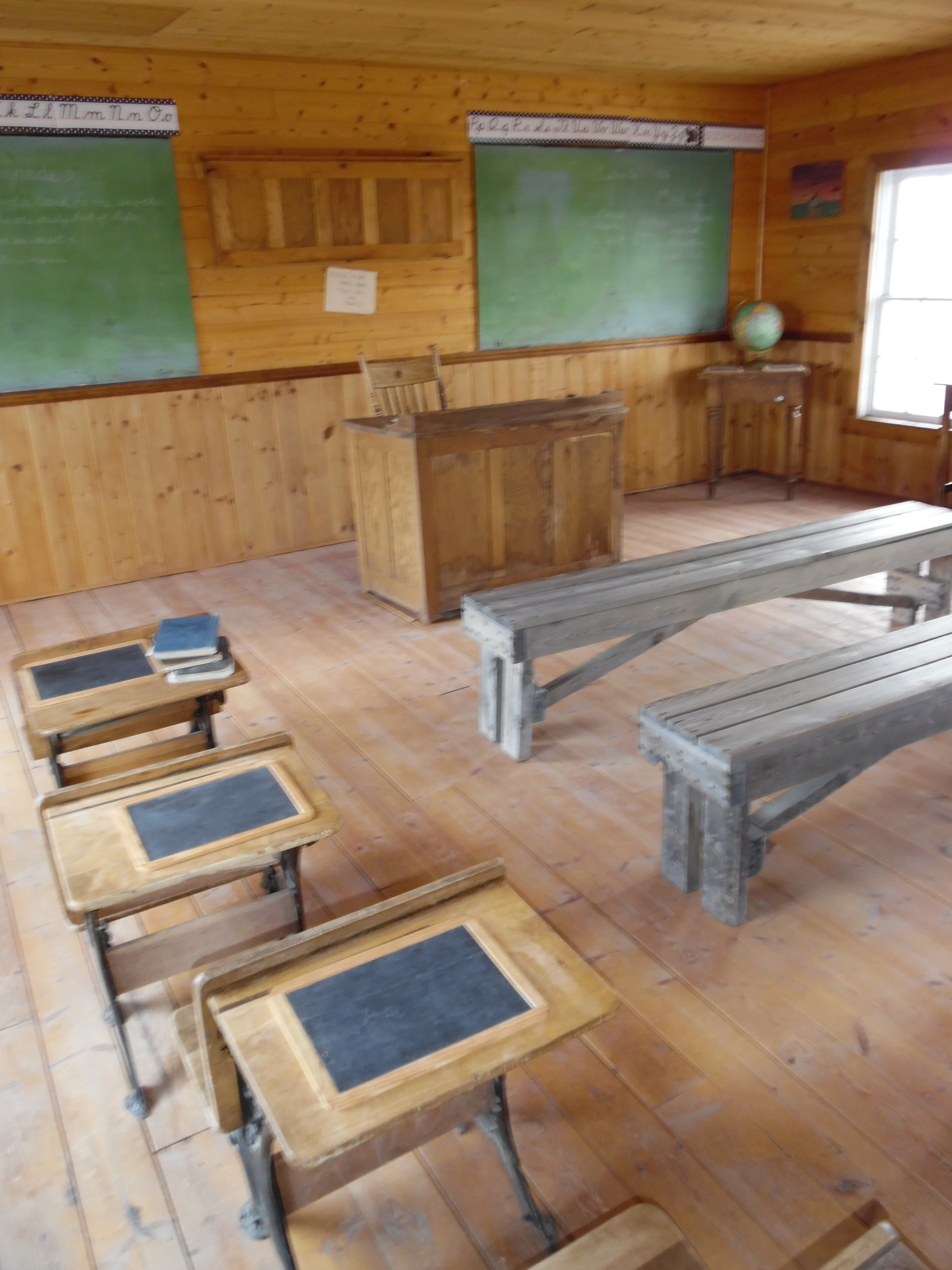
*Inside Sunset School

== Access ==
The Fort Rock Valley Historical Homestead Museum is located at the main road junction in the small unincorporated community of Fort Rock. The museum is open on Friday, Saturday, and Sunday from mid-May through the end of September. The museum is open for self-guided walking tours from 10:00 a.m. until 4:00 p.m. Arrangements for group tours must be made in advance. The visitor center has historic exhibits, books, gifts, and public restrooms.
