= Fort Rock =

Rock formation in Oregon, United States

- amana baniʔi (Northern Paiute)
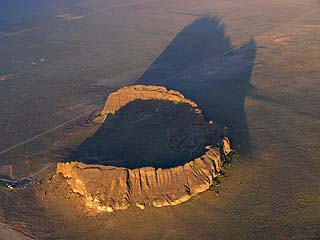
- Aerial view of Fort Rock from the northeast.

Highest point
- Elevation: 4,699 ft (1,432 m) NAVD 88
- Prominence: 345 ft (105 m)
- Coordinates: 43°22′20″N 121°04′26″W

Geography
- Location: Lake County, Oregon, U.S.
- Parent range: Basin and Range

Geology
- Rock age: 50,000 to 100,000 years
- Mountain type: Tuff ring

Climbing
- Easiest route: Trail

U.S. National Natural Landmark
- Designated: 1976

Fort Rock (Northern Paiute: amana baniʔi) is a tuff ring located on an ice age lake bed in north Lake County, Oregon, United States. The ring is about 4,460 feet (1,360 m) in diameter and stands about 200 feet (60 m) high above the surrounding plain. Its name is derived from the tall, straight sides that resemble the palisades of a fort. The region of Fort Rock–Christmas Lake Valley basin contains about 40 such tuff rings and maars and is located in the Brothers Fault Zone of central Oregon's Great Basin. William Sullivan, an early settler in the area, named Fort Rock in 1873 while searching for lost cattle. Prior to European settlement, the Northern Paiute called the formation amana baniʔi, which means "big cavity" (like on someone's chest).

== Geology ==
Fort Rock was created when basalt magma rose to the surface and encountered the wet muds of a lake bottom. Powered by a jet of steam, molten basalt was blown into the air, creating a fountain of hot lava particles and frothy ash. The pieces and blobs of hot lava and ash rained down around the vent and formed a saucer-shaped ring of lapilli tuff and volcanic ash sitting like an island in the lake waters. Steam explosions also loosened angular chunks of black and red lava rock comprising the valley floor. These blocky inclusions are incorporated into the fine-grained tuff layers at Fort Rock. Waves from the lake waters eroded the outside of the ring, cutting the steep cliffs into terraces 66 feet (20 m) above the floor of Fort Rock Valley.

The wave-cut terraces on the south side of the ring mark former lake levels of this now-dry lakebed. Southerly winds, which are still predominant in this region, apparently drove waves against the south side of the ring, eroding the soft ash layers, breaching it, and creating a large opening on the south side.

== Age estimates ==
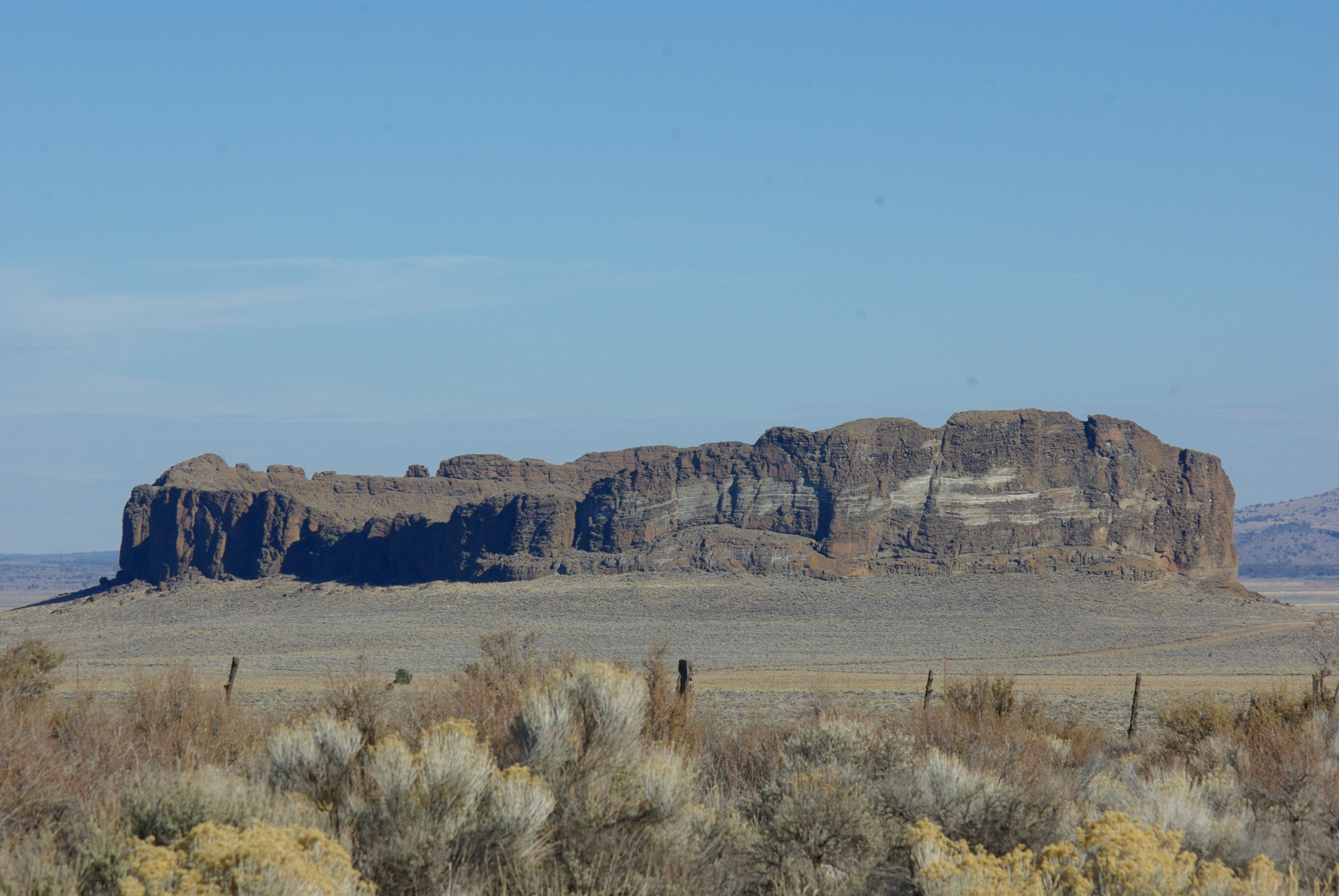
Fort Rock looking east from the Fort Rock Road

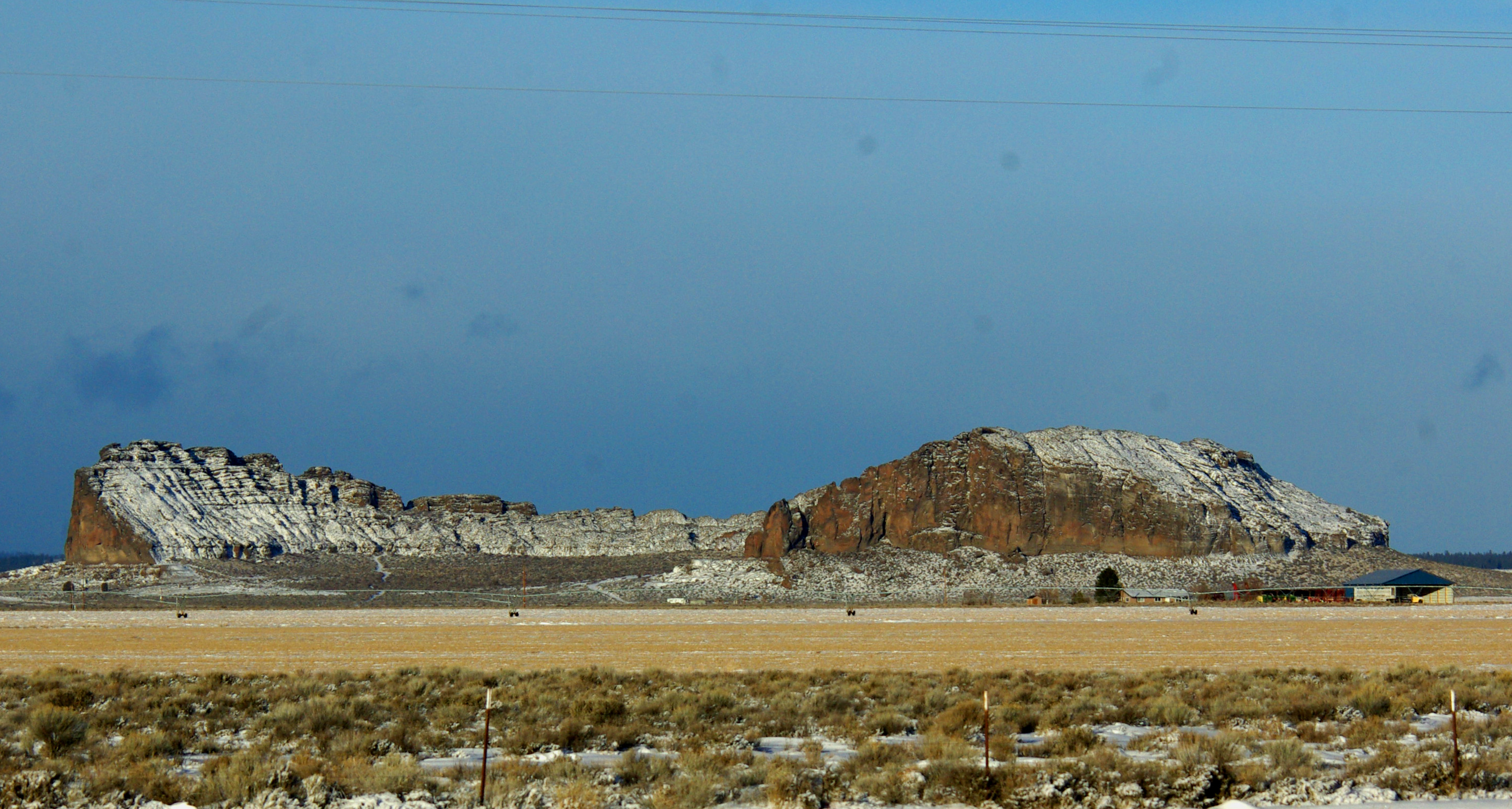
Winter view looking northwest into open side

Previous age estimates of Fort Rock ranged upwards to 1.8 million years. Recently, the age of Fort Rock has been estimated at 50,000 to 100,000 years. This coincides with a period of time when large pluvial lakes filled the valleys of central Oregon and much of the Great Basin of the western United States. At its maximum, the water in Fort Rock Lake was estimated to cover nearly 900 square miles (2,300 km^{2}) and was about 150 feet (46 m) deep where the Fort Rock tuff ring formed.

The extensive terrace on the side of Fort Rock marks one lakeshore about 14,000 years ago. Even higher water levels are recorded on the tuff cliffs and at one point only the tops of the tuff ring were exposed as rocky islands in this inland sea. An age of about 21,000 years ago has been found for this highest lake level.

== Fort Rock State Natural Area ==
Fort Rock is designated as Fort Rock State Natural Area (formerly Fort Rock State Park).

== Other geological features ==
A nearby tuff ring has a water-formed cave, called Fort Rock Cave, where in 1938 Luther Cressman from the University of Oregon discovered sagebrush sandals and human artifacts dated approximately 9,000 to 10,000 years ago. Hole-in-the-Ground and Big Hole are two nearby maars nearly one mile in diameter that were formed by steam explosion. They resemble impact craters formed by meteorites, but lack the heavy metal signature residues of space objects. Crack in the Ground and Fossil Lake are two more nearby Ice Age geological features.

South Ice Cave is a lava tube. Derrick Cave is estimated to be 1,200 feet (370 m) long. Devil's Garden Lava Field and East Lava Field are other geological oddities northeast of Fort Rock a few miles. Inflated lava, kīpuka, and lava ponds are found here, plus both ʻaʻā and pāhoehoe flows. Fort Rock Valley Historical Homestead Museum and the small community of Fort Rock are one mile south of Fort Rock State Natural Area.

== See also ==
- Fort Rock–Christmas Lake Valley basin
