= Black Hills (Oregon) =

Mountain range in Oregon, U.S.

- Location within Oregon

Highest point
- Elevation: 1,558 m (5,112 ft)

Geography
- Country: United States
- State: Oregon
- District: Lake County
- Range coordinates: 43°10′9.518″N 120°40′47.944″W
- Topo map: USGS Christmas Valley

The Black Hills are a mountain range in Lake County, Oregon. They are located to the immediate south of the community of Christmas Valley; just off of Old Lake Highway. It is a vent of the Fort Rock–Christmas Lake Valley basin volcanic field.
