= Derrick Cave =

Lava tube cavern in Lake County, Oregon, USA

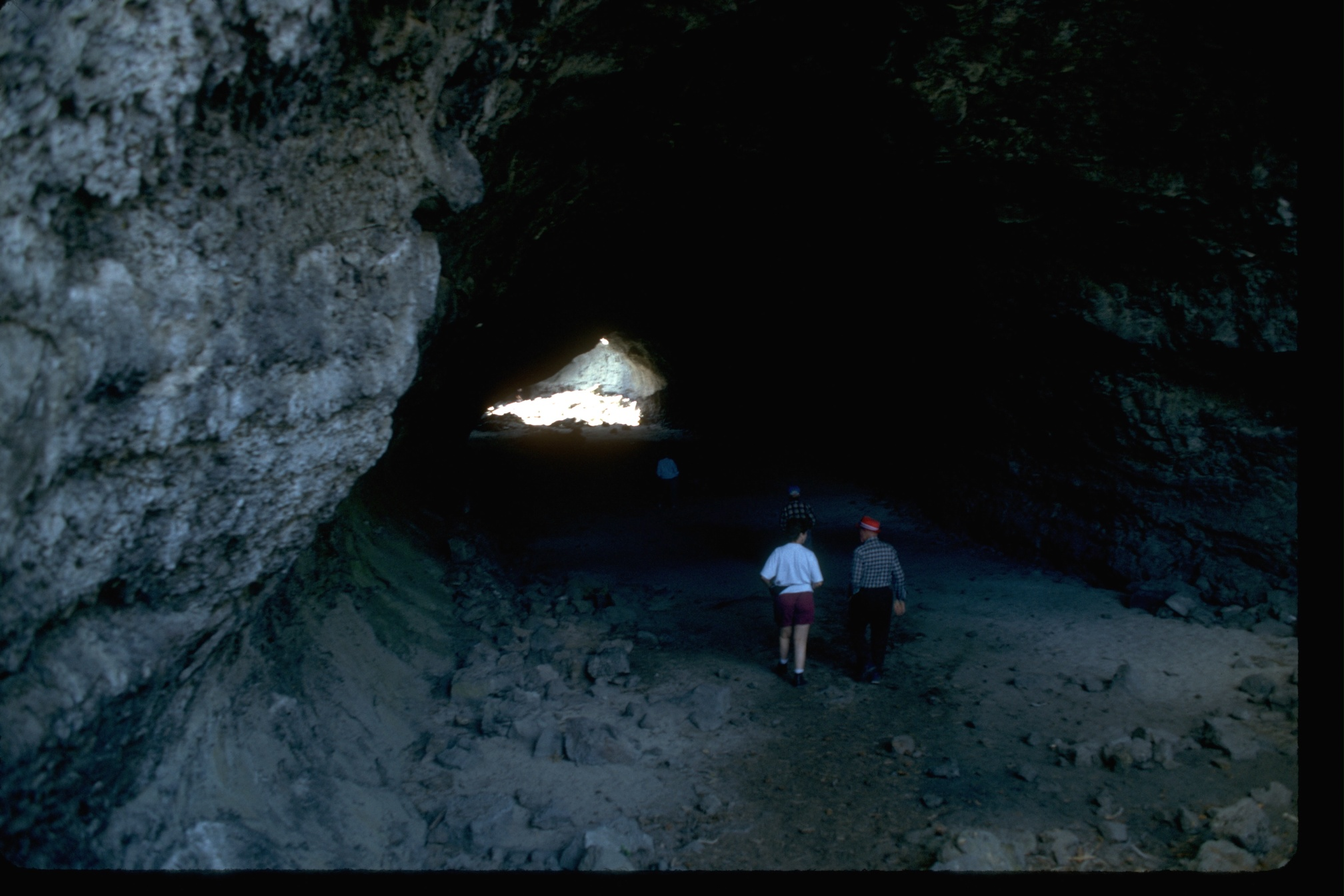
- Visitors walking through Derrick Cave
- Interactive map of Derrick Cave
- Location: Northern Lake County, Oregon, United States
- Coordinates: 43.5226°N 120.8656°W
- Depth: 53 feet (16 m)
- Length: 1,134 feet (346 m)
- Geology: Lava tube
- Difficulty: Moderate
- Access: Public

Derrick Cave is a lava tube located in the remote northwest corner of Lake County, Oregon. The cave is approximately 1,200 feet (370 m) long. It is up to 80 feet (24 m) wide and 46 feet (14 m) high in places. It was named in honor of H.E. Derrick, a pioneer rancher with a homestead 3 miles (4.8 km) southeast of the cave. The land around the cave is managed by the United States Department of Interior, Bureau of Land Management. Derrick Cave is open to the public year-round; however, camping is no longer permitted in the cave.

== Geology ==
Derrick Cave is a classic lava tube structure. It was created by lava flowing downhill from a volcanic vent located north of the cave. Lava from the vent also created Devils Garden, a 45 square miles (120 km^{2}) lava bed southwest of the cave. Most of the lava deposited around the Devils Garden area was delivered through the Derrick Cave lava tube.

Derrick Cave began as an open channel of lava flowing south from a large volcanic vent. Eventually, a lava crust solidified over the top of the flowing lava. This formed a roof over the river, enclosing it in a lava tunnel or tube. When the eruption from the vent stopped, the lava drained out of the tube leaving a lava tube cave behind. After the cave cooled, several sections of its roof collapsed. These collapsed ceiling sections provided entrances to both the north and south parts of the cave.

The age of the eruption that formed Derrick Cave has not been definitively determined. However, it is known that the flow is no older than 13,000 years and no younger than 6,845 year-old, dated from overlaying Mount Mazama tephra that blankets the entire Devils Garden area including the surface area above Derrick Cave.

== History ==
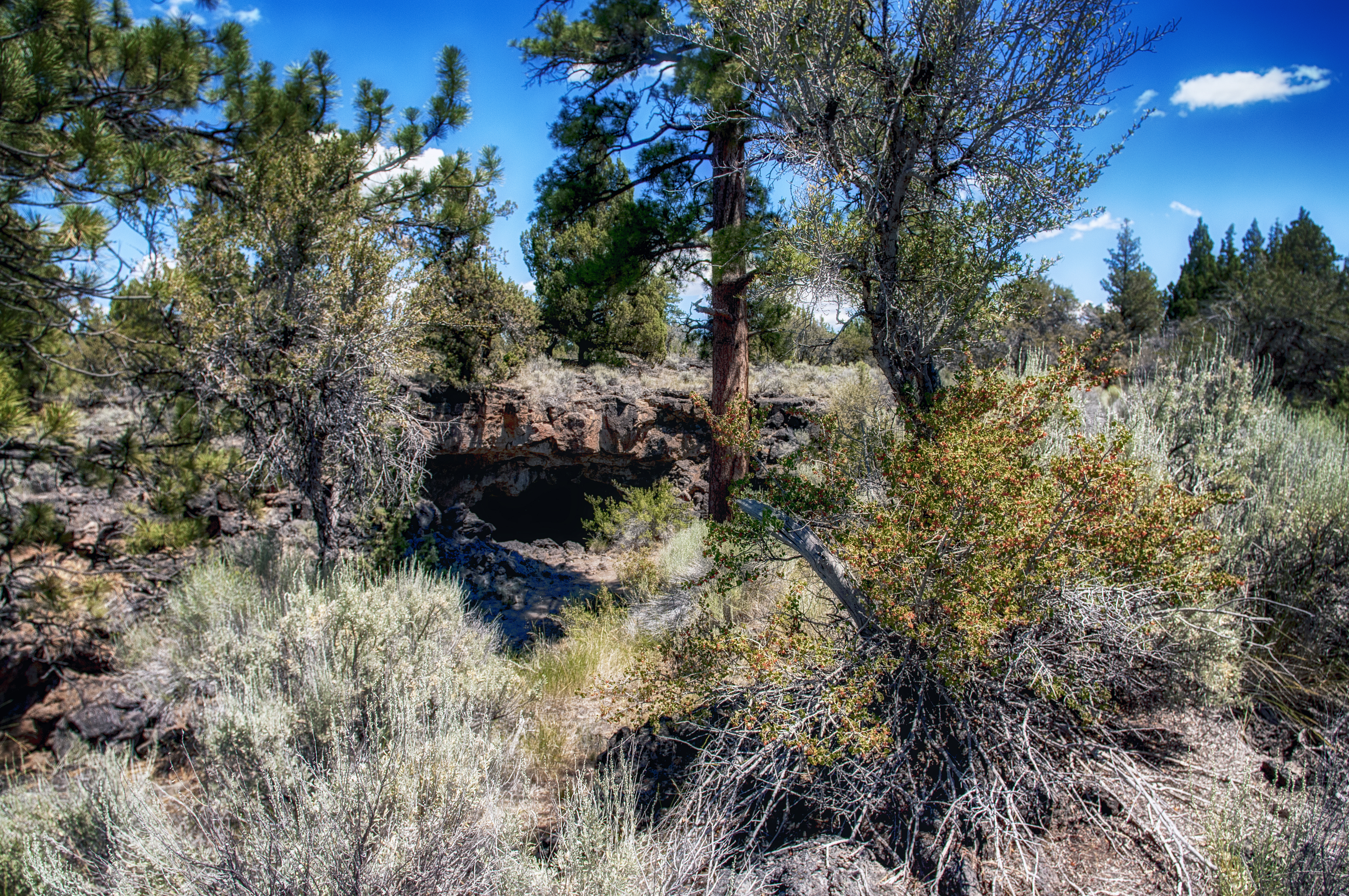
Derrick Cave entrance in Oregon's "High Desert"

The cave was named for H. E. Derrick, a pioneer rancher with a homestead 3 miles (4.8 km) southeast of the cave. Because it was large and cool, early homesteaders in the Fort Rock area often used the cave as a summer recreation site. During social gatherings at the cave, families used the ice found in the cavern to make ice cream.

During the early days of World War II, local residents planned to use Derrick Cave as an air-raid shelter if the Japanese began bombing the west coast of the United States. While residents of Central Oregon never needed an air raid shelter during World War II, Derrick Cave was designated as a nuclear fallout shelter in 1963. Supplies of food and water for up to 1,200 people were stored at the site. The supplies were stored in a small branch of the cave behind a locked steel door. However, vandals broke into the supply vault on several occasions and plundered the food cache. The vandals left the civil defense water cans, probably because they had frozen solid. By 1970, all of the supplies had been stolen by vandals or removed by civil defense authorities.

The National Aeronautic and Space Administration also used Derrick Cave in the 1960s. As the agency was planning lunar landings, it was interested in determining if caverns could be detected from high altitude using gravimetric instruments. To support the National Aeronautic and Space Administration, North American Aviation and Pacific Northwest Bell conducted high altitude gravimetric tests using Derrick Cave as the underground target.

In 1994, the Bureau of Land Management issued new rules for Derrick Cave. These new rules closed the cave to camping, camp fires, and cigarette smoking. Also, large group gatherings were discouraged. These activities raised the temperature inside the cave, disturbing bats and fragile microorganisms. Climbing with bolts was prohibited as well. The rules were posted on a sign near the entrance to the cave.

== Environment ==
The area near the cave entrance is dominated by Western juniper and Ponderosa pine with big sagebrush, bitterbrush, mountain mahogany, rabbitbrush, and a variety of desert grasses as the main ground cover. Common grasses in this area include Idaho fescue, bunch grass, and bluebunch wheatgrass.

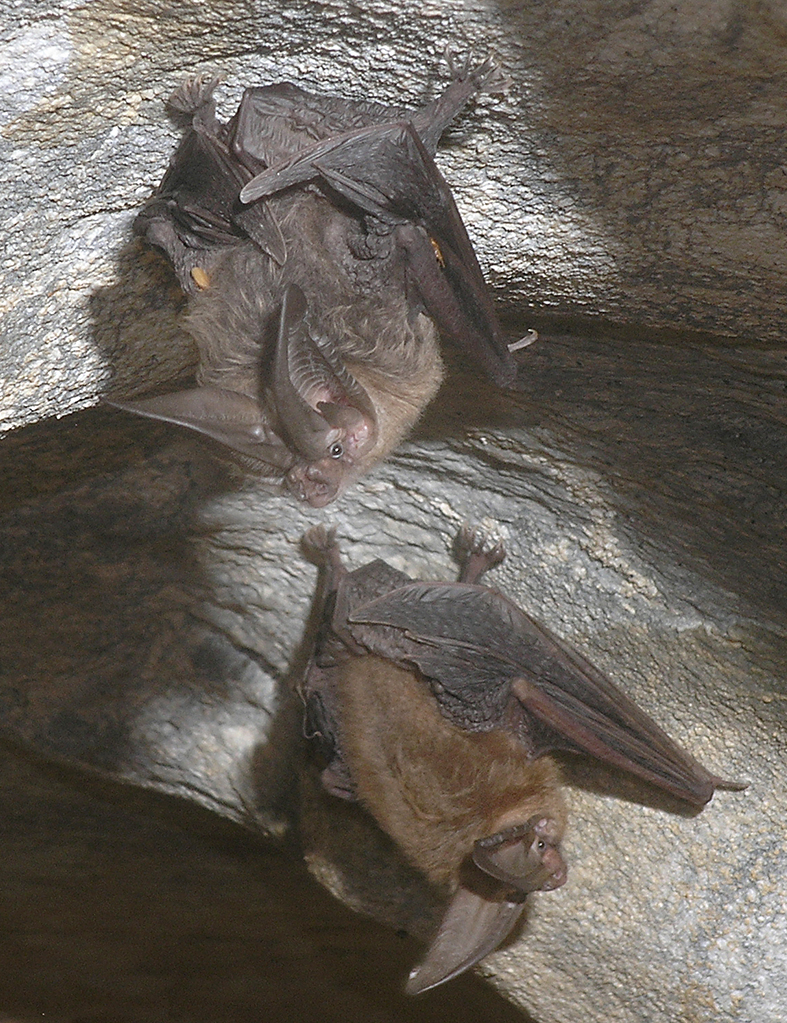
Townsend’s big-eared bats

Animals common in the forest around the cave include mule deer, pronghorn, coyotes, bobcats, cougar, and American black bear. Smaller mammals include American badgers, porcupines, golden-mantled ground squirrels, and chipmunks. There is also a wide range of bird species common to the Derrick Cave area. Small bird species include mountain bluebirds, western meadowlarks, white-crowned sparrows, lark sparrows, and sage grouse. Larger birds include ravens, great horned owls, turkey vultures, red-tailed hawks, golden eagles, and bald eagles.

Inside the cave, water from rainfall and snow melt seeps down through the soil and cracks in the cave roof, accumulating as ice during the winter months. Dripping winter drainage often forms ice stalagmites that are 3 feet (0.91 m) tall. While the ice normally melts away in the summer, it has been known to last through an entire year before disappearing the following summer.

Derrick Cave is home to a population of Townsend's big-eared bats. The bats hibernate until late April and resume hibernation in October. They are nocturnal mammals, active at night and asleep during the day. If a bat is sighted, the Oregon Department of Fish and Wildlife recommends not disturbing it. This is particularly important when the bats are hibernating. Waking a bat from hibernation is extremely stressful, and can cause the bat to die from the sudden expenditure of energy.

== Cave tour ==
Derrick Cave is open year around. The mouth of the cave is at an elevation of 4,960 feet (1,510 m) above sea level. The cave is between 14.5 feet (4.4 m) and 53 feet (16 m) below ground level. The total length of the cave is 1,134 feet (346 m). The Bureau of Land Management rates the cave as moderately difficult.

The entrance to Derrick cave appears as a large broken-face hole in the ground. From its mouth, the entrance leads to a wide lava tube. The lava tube runs in two directions from the entrance: north and south. The north cave is relatively small. This is the area where the civil defense shelter was once located. The south portion of the cave runs gradually downhill in a southwesterly direction from the entrance. In this area of the lava tube, the floor is covered by volcanic sand. Over the centuries, the ceiling has collapsed in several areas of the cave, creating natural skylights, and leaving piles of rock below. In this area, the cave is about 30 feet (9.1 m) wide. Beyond the last skylight, the cave is dark and artificial light is required. After a short walk, the cave opens into a large room 80 feet (24 m) wide with a ceiling that reaches a height of 46 feet (14 m). This area is known as the Big Room. In the Big Room and beyond, the original lava flow lines can be seen along the walls. They appear as rounded over-hanging shelves and lateral markings etched in the walls. In some places there are also 5-inch (13 cm) lavacicles hanging from the ceiling. These formations were created after the lava had drained out of the tube leaving superheated gases trapped in the lava tube. The hot gases melted the walls of the lava tube causing drips to form. As the gas cooled, the remaining drips hardened into lavacicles.

== Visiting ==
Derrick Cave is located at the northeast corner of Devils Garden, 22 miles (35 km) northeast of the unincorporated community of Fort Rock, Oregon. The land around the cave is managed by the Bureau of Land Management. The road to Derrick Cave is very rough and there are no facilities at the site. The Bureau of Land Management recommends that visitors plan their trip carefully and use caution along the road to the cave site. Visitors should wear warm clothing because the cave is quite cool. Battery powered lights are best, as long as they provide reliable illumination.

Today, the Bureau of Land Management has established rules designed to protect caves located on government property. The rules that apply to Derrick Cave and other Bureau of Land Management administered caves in Oregon and Washington specifically prohibit the following activities in and around natural caves:

- Defacing, removing or destroying plants, soil, rocks, minerals, or other cave resources
- Digging, excavating, or displacing any natural or cultural features
- Camping
- Building campfires, using stoves, or smoking
- Depositing or disposing of human waste in or near a cave
- Discharging a firearm, air rifle, or paint gun
- Possessing or discharging fireworks or other pyrotechnics
- Bringing a domestic animal into a cave
- Any activity that disturbs the environment within a 350 feet (110 m) radius of a cave opening or any known cave passages
