= Crack in the Ground =

Volcanic fissure about 3.2 kilometers (2 miles) long

Coordinates: 43.32508°N 120.66520°W

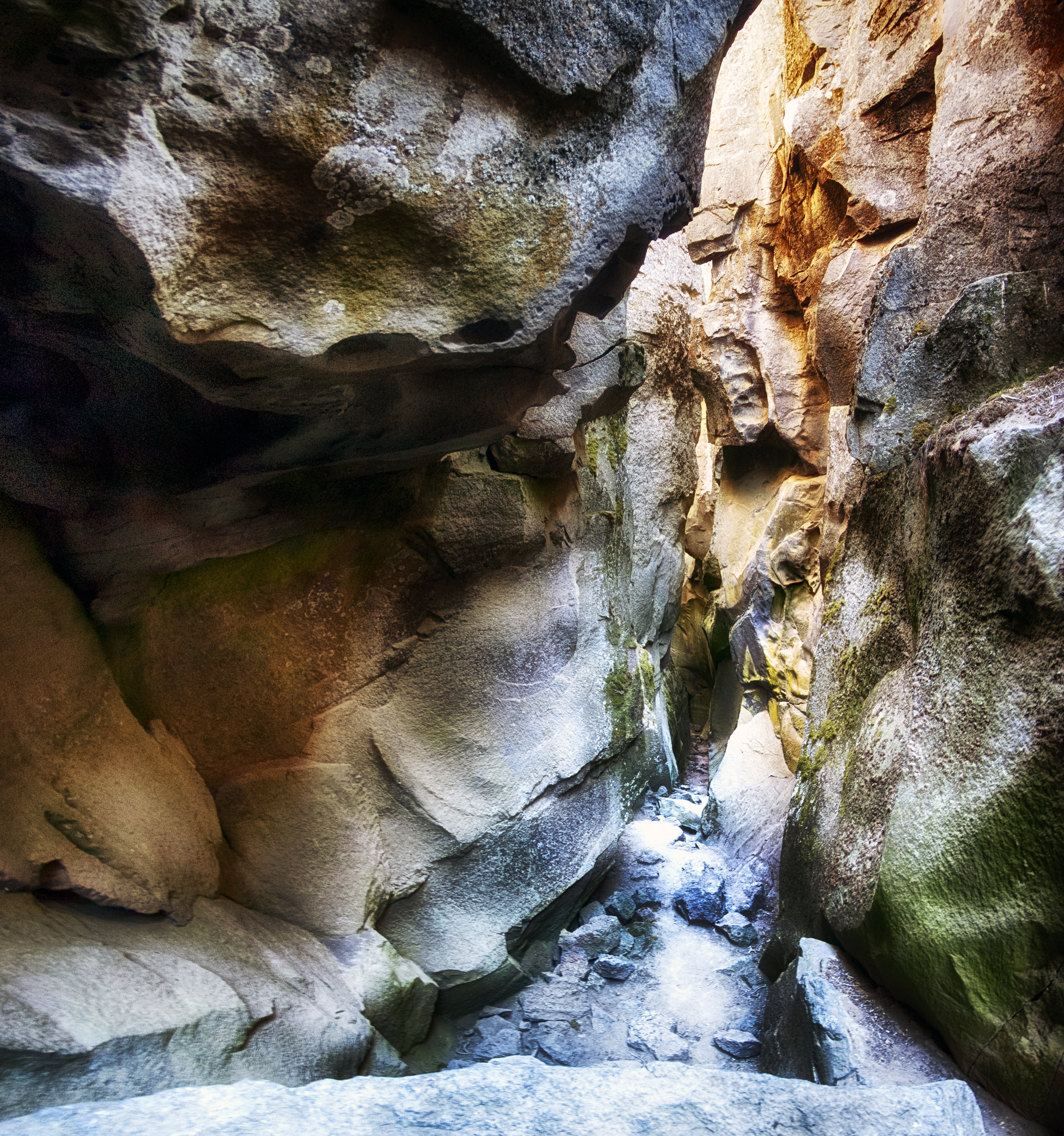
Crack in the Ground

Crack in the Ground is a volcanic fissure about 2 miles (3.2 km) long with depths measuring nearly 30 feet (9 m) below ground level in Central Oregon, United States. The formation of the fissure occurred approximately between 700,000 and 12,000 years ago. The eruptions from the Four Craters Lava Field were accompanied by a slight sinking of the older rock surface, forming a shallow, graben-like structure about 2 miles (3.2 km) wide and extending to the south into an old lake basin. Crack in the Ground marks the western edge of this small, volcano-tectonic depression. The crack is the result of a tension fracture along a hingeline produced by the draping of Green Mountain lava flows over the edge of upthrown side of the concealed fault zone. The fissure is located at the southwest corner of Four Craters Lava Field. Hikers can walk the length of the main crack and explore its tributaries.

== See also ==
- Big Hole (Oregon)
- Hole-in-the-Ground
