= Big Hole (Oregon) =

Large volcanic explosion crater (Maar) in the state of Oregon

- Maar
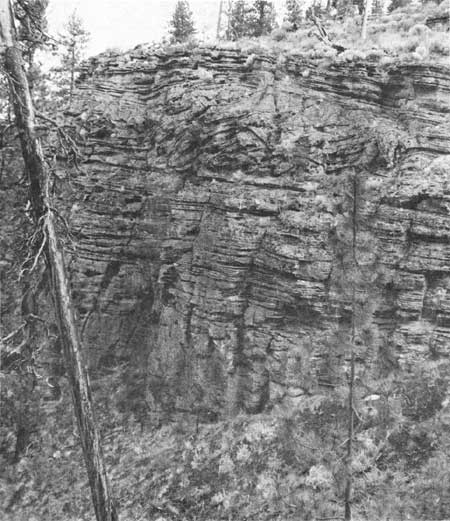
- East rim of Big Hole, Oregon.
- Interactive map of Big Hole
- Coordinates: 43°25′30″N 121°18′48″W
- Location: Lake County, Oregon, U.S.
- Range: Cascade Range
- Age: Possibly 20,000 years
- Elevation: 1,406 m (4,613 ft) at the bottom
- Last eruption: 10,000-100,000 years ago
- Topo map: USGS Big Hole

Big Hole is a large maar (explosion crater) in the Fort Rock basin of Lake County, central Oregon, northeast of Crater Lake, near Oregon Route 31. It is approximately 6000 ft (1820 m) across and 300 feet (91 m) deep.

It is close to another smaller, but less-eroded maar crater, Hole-in-the-Ground.

== See also ==
- Crack in the Ground
- Hole-in-the-Ground
