= Phreatomagmatic eruption =

Volcanic eruption involving both steam and magma

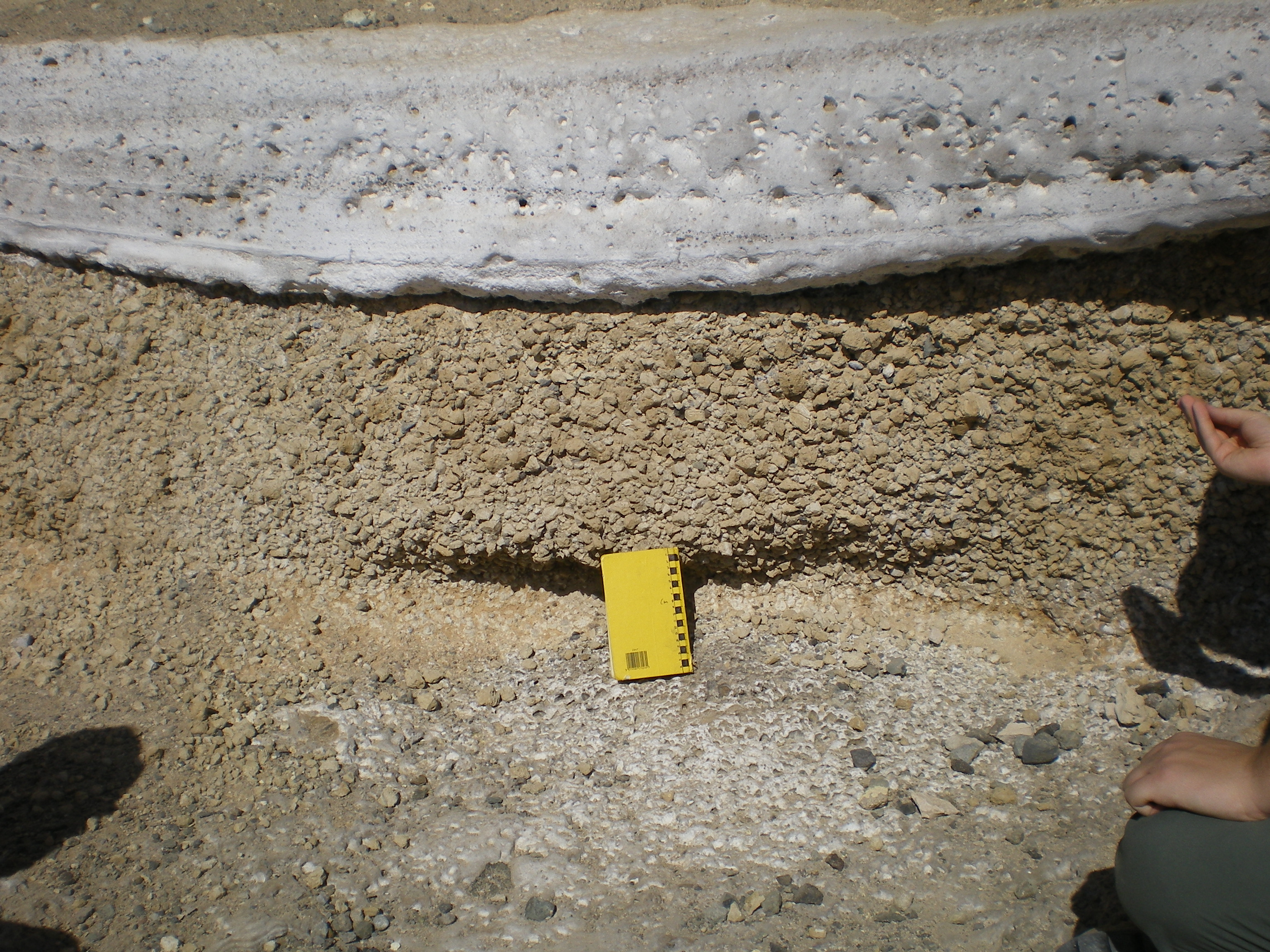
Ashfall deposit of phreatomagmatic origin, overlying lapilli fall deposit of magmatic origin

Phreatomagmatic eruptions are volcanic eruptions resulting from interaction between magma and water. They differ from exclusively magmatic eruptions and phreatic eruptions. Unlike phreatic eruptions, the products of phreatomagmatic eruptions contain juvenile (magmatic) clasts. It is common for a large explosive eruption to have magmatic and phreatomagmatic components.

== Mechanisms ==
Several competing theories exist as to the exact mechanism of ash formation. The most common is the theory of explosive thermal contraction of particles under rapid cooling from contact with water. In many cases the water is supplied by the sea, such as in the Surtsey eruption. In other cases the water may be present in a lake or caldera-lake, as at Santorini, where the phreatomagmatic component of the Minoan eruption was a result of both a lake and later the sea. There have also been examples of interaction between magma and water in an aquifer. Many of the cinder cones on Tenerife are considered to be phreatomagmatic because of these circumstances.

The other competing theory is based on fuel-coolant reactions, which have been modeled for nuclear reactors. Under this theory, the fuel (in this case, the magma) fragments upon contact with a coolant (the sea, a lake or aquifer). The propagating stress waves and thermal contraction widen cracks and increase the interaction surface area, leading to explosively rapid cooling rates. The two mechanisms proposed are very similar and the reality is most likely a combination of both.

== Deposits ==
Phreatomagmatic ash is formed by the same mechanisms across a wide range of compositions, basic and acidic. Blocky and equant clasts with low vesicle content are formed. The deposits of phreatomagmatic explosive eruptions are also considered to be better sorted and finer grained than the deposits of magmatic eruption. This is a result of the much higher fragmentation of phreatomagmatic eruptions.

=== Hyaloclastite ===
Hyaloclastite is glass found with pillow basalts that were produced by non-explosive quenching and fracturing of basaltic glass. These are still classed as phreatomagmatic eruptions, as they produce juvenile clasts from the interaction of water and magma. They can be formed at water depths of >500 m, where hydrostatic pressure is high enough to inhibit vesiculation in basaltic magma.

=== Hyalotuff ===
Hyalotuff is a type of rock formed by the explosive fragmentation of glass during phreatomagmatic eruptions at shallow water depths (or within aquifers). Hyalotuffs have a layered nature that is considered to be a result of dampened oscillation in discharge rate, with a period of several minutes. The deposits are much finer grained than the deposits of magmatic eruptions, due to the much higher fragmentation of the type of eruption. The deposits appear better sorted than magmatic deposits in the field because of their fine nature, but grain size analysis reveals that the deposits are much more poorly sorted than their magmatic counterparts. A clast known as an accretionary lapilli is distinctive to phreatomagmatic deposits, and is a major factor for identification in the field. Accretionary lapilli form as a result of the cohesive properties of wet ash, causing the particles to bind. They have a circular structure when specimens are viewed in hand and under the microscope.

A further control on the morphology and characteristics of a deposit is the water to magma ratio. It is considered that the products of phreatomagmatic eruptions are fine grained and poorly sorted where the magma/water ratio is high, but when there is a lower magma/water ratio the deposits may be coarser and better sorted.

== Surface features ==
Crest of old tuff ring, including part of the maar crater of a monogenetic volcano, Tenerife, Canary Islands. The maar crater has been used for agriculture.

There are two types of vent landforms from the explosive interaction of magma and ground or surface water; tuff cones and tuff rings. Both of the landforms are associated with monogenetic volcanoes and polygenetic volcanoes. In the case of polygenetic volcanoes they are often interbedded with lavas, ignimbrites and ash- and lapilli-fall deposits. It is expected that tuff rings and tuff cones might be present on the surface of Mars.

=== Tuff rings ===
Tuff rings have a low profile apron of tephra surrounding a wide crater (called a maar crater) that is generally lower than the surrounding topography. The tephra is often unaltered and thinly bedded, and is generally considered to be an ignimbrite, or the product of a pyroclastic density current. They are built around a volcanic vent located in a lake, coastal zone, marsh or an area of abundant groundwater.

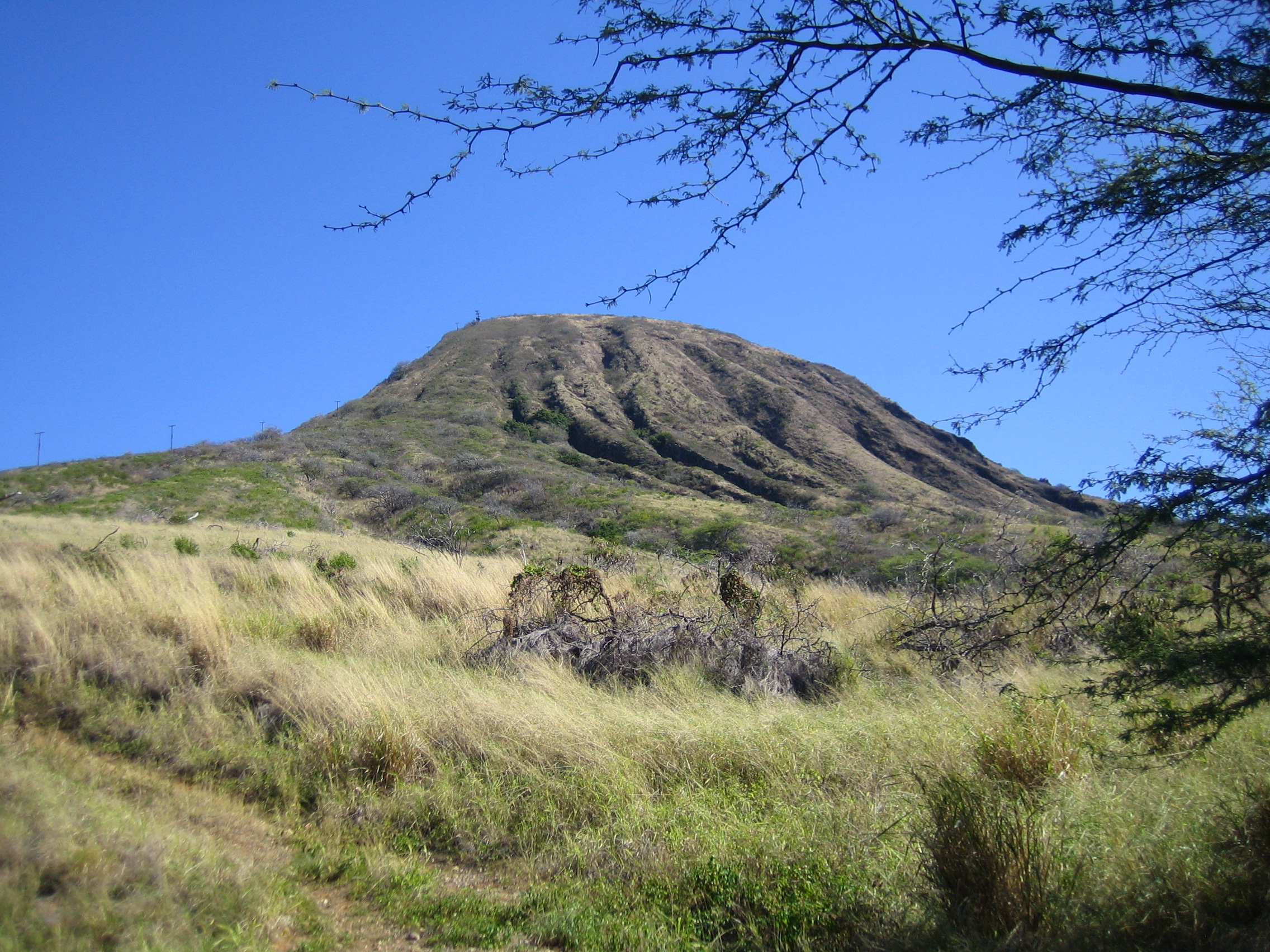
Koko Crater is an old extinct tuff cone in the Hawaiian Island of Oahu.

=== Tuff cones ===
Tuff cones are steep sloped and cone shaped. They have wide craters and are formed of highly altered, thickly bedded tephra. They are considered to be a taller variant of a tuff ring, formed by less powerful eruptions. Tuff cones are usually small in height. Koko Crater is 1,208 feet.

== Examples ==
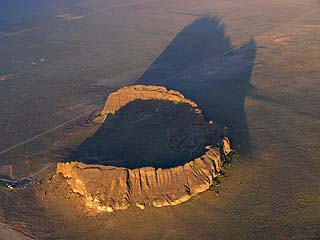
Fort Rock, an eroded tuff ring in Oregon, US.

=== Minoan eruption of Santorini ===
Santorini is part of the Southern Aegean volcanic arc, 140 km north of Crete. The Minoan eruption of Santorini, was the latest eruption and occurred in the first half of the 17th century BC. The eruption was of predominantly rhyodacite composition. The Minoan eruption had four phases. Phase 1 was a white to pink pumice fallout with dispersal axis trending ESE. The deposit has a maximum thickness of 6 m and ash flow layers are interbedded at the top. Phase 2 has ash and lapilli beds that are cross stratified with mega-ripples and dune-like structures. The deposit thicknesses vary from 10 cm to 12 m. Phases 3 and 4 are pyroclastic density current deposits. Phases 1 and 3 were phreatomagmatic.

=== 1991 eruption of Mount Pinatubo ===
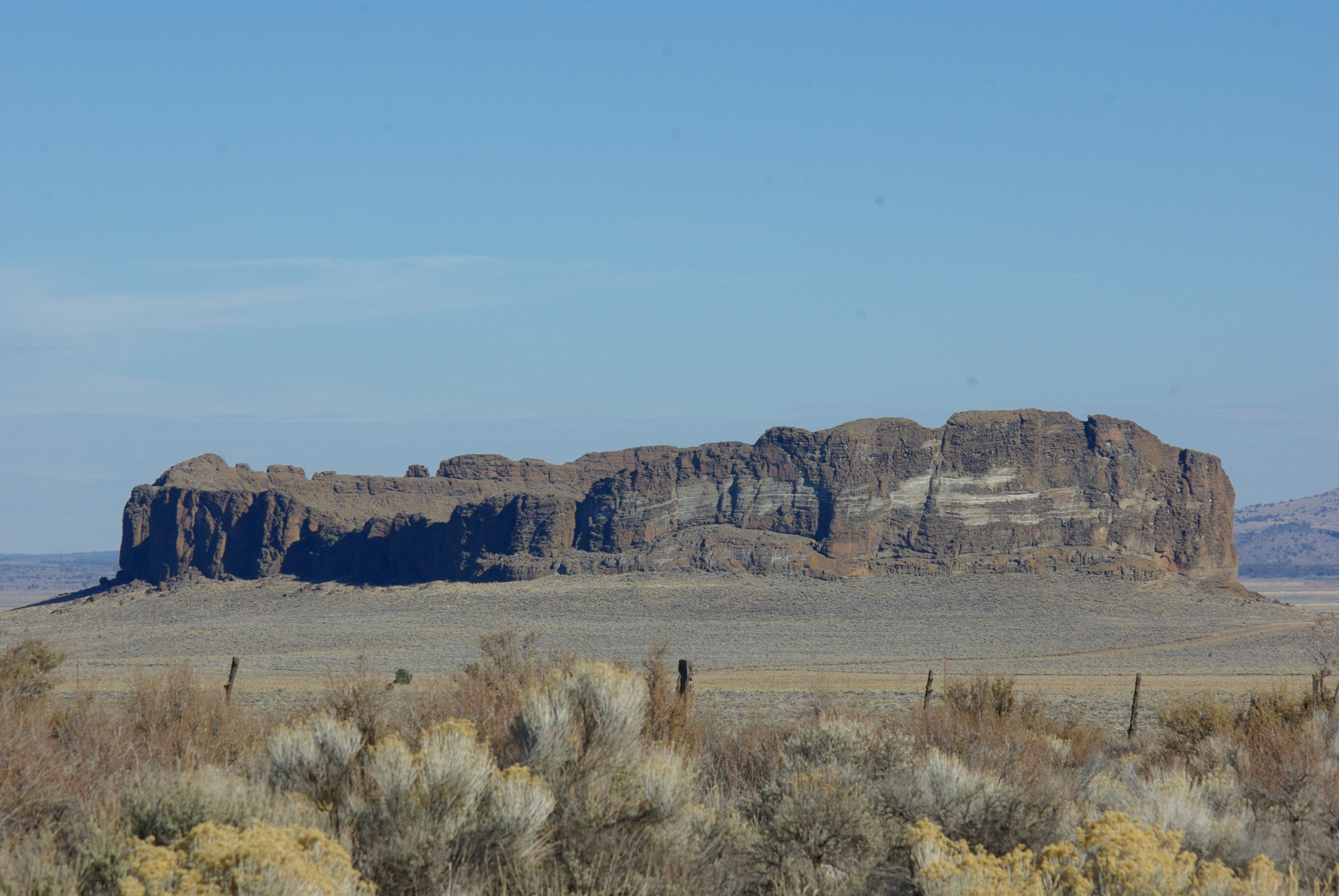
Fort Rock, as seen from the ground.

Mount Pinatubo is on the Central Luzon landmass between the South China Sea and the Philippine Sea. The 1991 eruption of Pinatubo was andesite and dacite in the pre-climactic phase but only dacite in the climactic phase. The climactic phase had a volume of 3.7–5.3 km^{3}. The eruption consisted of sequentially increasing ash emissions, dome growth, 4 vertical eruptions with continued dome growth, 13 pyroclastic flows and a climactic vertical eruption with associated pyroclastic flows. The pre-climactic phase was phreatomagmatic.

=== 1883 Krakatoa eruption ===
The 1883 eruption of Krakatoa is one of the most powerful examples of a phreatomagmatic eruption. On August 26-27, 1883, Krakatoa erupted violently, erupting and estimated 18 – 21 km3 of ejecta (9 – 10 km3 dense rock equivalent). This places the eruption as a VEI-6 on the volcanic explosivity index (VEI). During the eruption, a catastrophic collapse of the volcanoes southwest flank occurred. This exposed magma to rapid depressurization underwater. As the flank collapsed, water poured into the now exposed magma conduit creating an extremely violent reaction. Combined with highly evolved rhyodacite magma, this interaction, partially driven by phreatomagmatic events created the loudest sound ever recorded.

=== Hatepe eruption ===
The Hatepe eruption in 232 ± 12 AD was the latest major eruption at Lake Taupō in New Zealand's Taupō Volcanic Zone. There was minor initial phreatomagmatic activity followed by the dry venting of 6 km^{3} of rhyolite forming the Hatepe Plinian Pumice. The vent was then infiltrated by large amounts of water causing the phreatomagmatic eruption that deposited the 2.5 km^{3} Hatepe Ash. The water eventually stopped the eruption though large amounts of water were still erupted from the vent. The eruption resumed with phreatomagmatic activity that deposited the Rotongaio Ash.

=== Grímsvötn eruptions ===
The Grímsvötn volcano in Iceland is a subglacial volcano, located beneath the Vatnajökull ice cap. For a typical subglacial eruption, overlying glacial ice is melted by the heat of the volcano below, and the subsequent introduction of meltwater to the volcanic system results in a phreatomagmatic explosion. Grímsvötn is host to an active geothermal system and is prone to phreatomagmatic eruptions. The melting of the overlying Vatnajökull ice cap also forms subglacial lakes which, when conditions are right, can burst forth as catastrophic glacial outburst floods known as jökulhlaup.

=== 2022 Hunga Tonga–Hunga Haʻapai eruption ===
On January 15, 2022, a powerful eruption occurred at the Hunga Tonga volcano. Rated as a VEI-5 eruption on the volcano explosivity index, this was the largest submarine volcanic eruption since the 1883 eruption of Krakatoa. This eruption was likely triggered by a phreatomagmatic interaction. This involved andesite magma (900-1100 C) and seawater around 150m in depth. Water pressure at this depth is around 15 bars. This resulted in a violent eruption, which included a huge ash column rising tens of kilometers into the atmosphere, intense volcanic lightning, and an eruption sound heard as far away as Anchorage, Alaska.

== See also ==
- Phreatic eruption – Volcanic eruption caused by an explosion of steam
- Types of volcanic eruptions
- Volcanic ash – Natural material created during volcanic eruptions
- Maar – Low-relief volcanic crater
- Volcanic pipe – Subterranean structure formed by volcanic eruption
- Emeishan Traps – Flood basalt igneous province in south-western China
