= Fort Rock, Oregon =

Unincorporated community in the state of Oregon, United States

- Unincorporated community
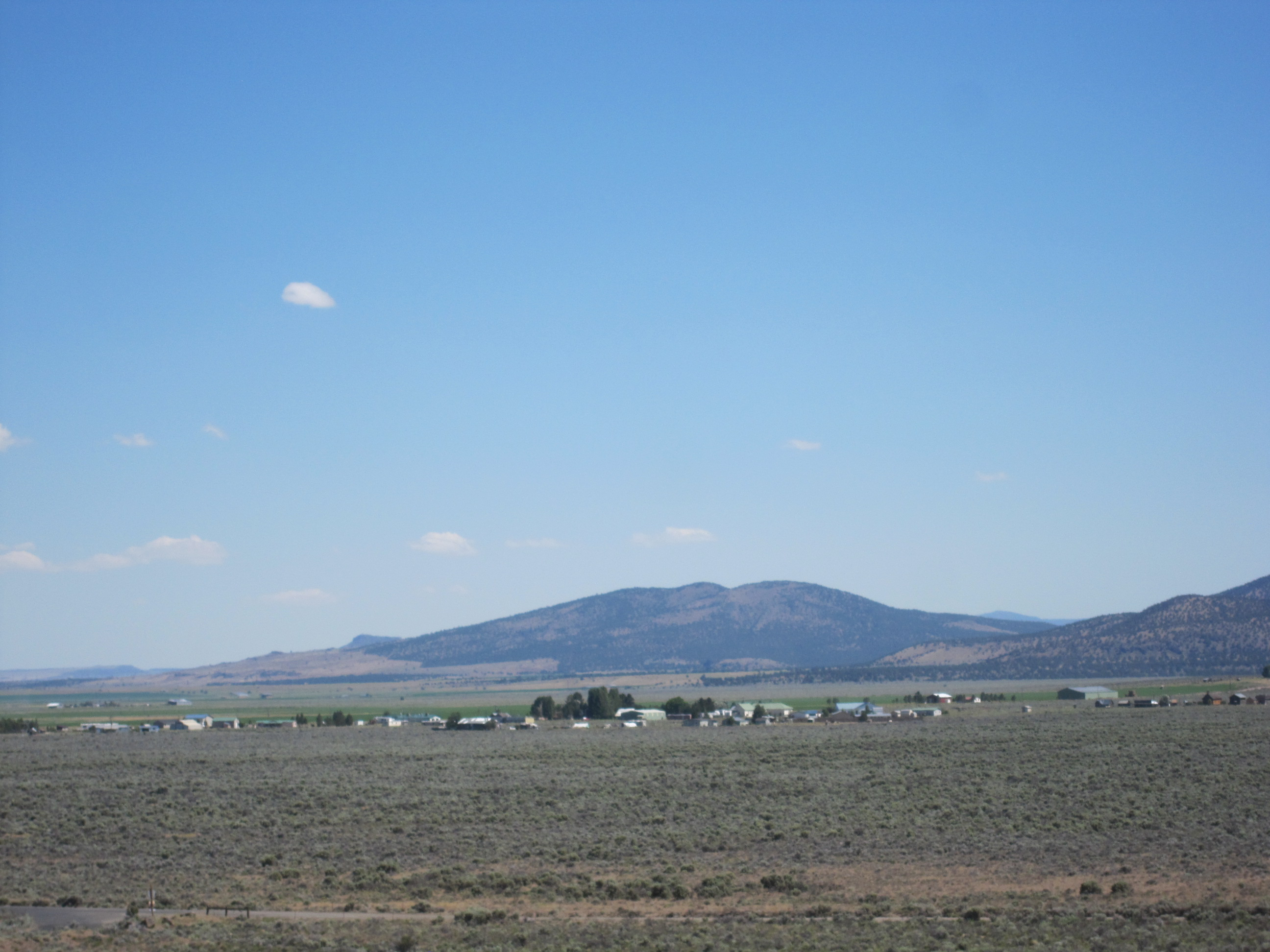
- View of Fort Rock from Fort Rock State Park

- Location within Oregon Location within the United States
- Coordinates: 43°21′23″N 121°03′14″W
- Country: United States
- State: Oregon
- County: Lake
- Elevation: 4,331 ft (1,320 m)
- Time zone: UTC−08:00 (Pacific)
  - Summer (DST): UTC−07:00 (Pacific)
- ZIP Code: 97735
- GNIS feature ID: 1136297

Fort Rock is an unincorporated community in Lake County, Oregon, United States, southeast of Fort Rock State Natural Area.

== History ==
The community of Fort Rock was named after the natural feature Fort Rock by the town's founder, Ray Nash. Fort Rock post office was established in 1908 under postmaster Josiah Thomas Rhoton. The Fort Rock Valley flourished briefly during the homestead period before World War I, but little remains in the area today. Fort Rock is one of two homestead-era communities remaining in the area, along with Silver Lake.

== Community ==
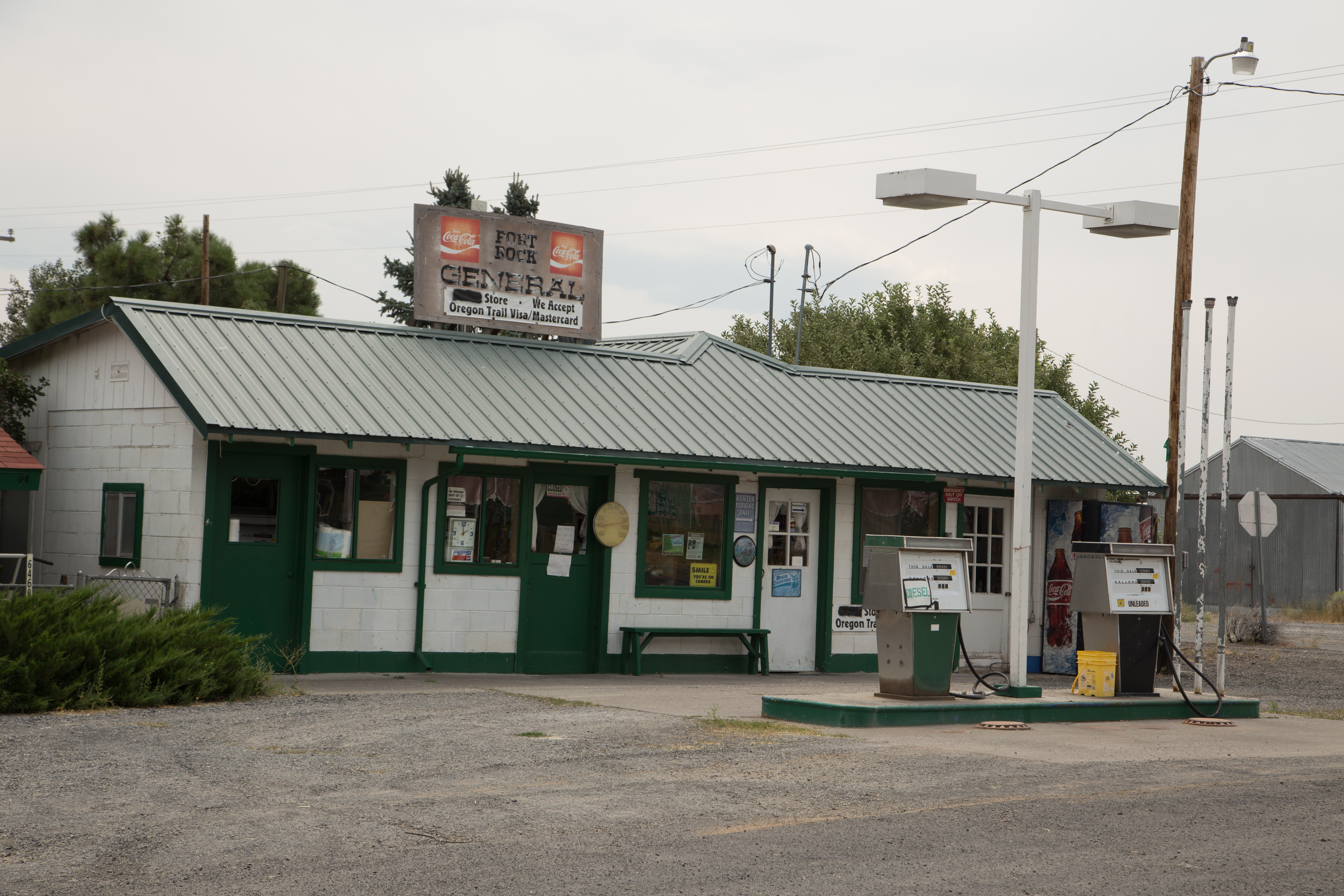
Fort Rock general store

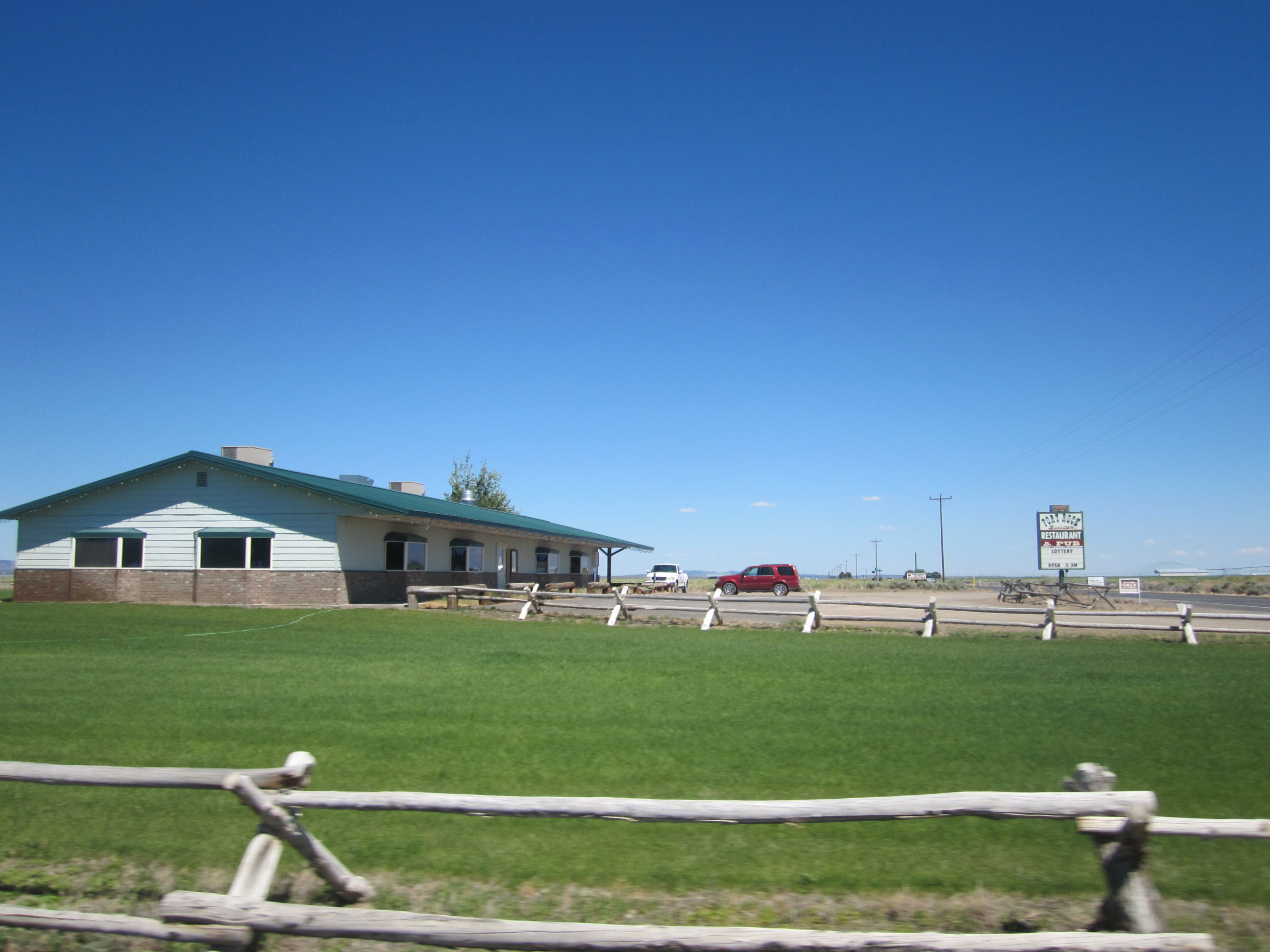
Fort Rock Restaurant

The Fort Rock community is located approximately 1 mile southeast of Fort Rock State Natural Area.

Fort Rock had a general store that was in operation since the early 1900s. The store, which also included a gas station, closed in May 2013. As of September 2014, the Oregon Department of Environmental Quality had entered into a prospective purchaser agreement to reopen the store after performing needed underground storage tank (UST) cleanup. The store has reopened as of 2017.

Fort Rock also has a community church, a Grange hall, a restaurant, a tavern, and a cemetery.

The Rock View Apartments burned down in 2012; the land on which the apartments was located was owned by the Fort Rock Care Center, which planned to donate it to the Fort Rock Historical Society in 2013. The senior apartments were only six years old when they burned.

Today, the Fort Rock community is supported by alfalfa farming, cattle ranching, and tourism. As of 2023, the town’s population was estimated to be 134 people.

== Museum ==
Today, many of the buildings in Fort Rock are part of the Fort Rock Valley Historical Society's Fort Rock Valley Historical Homestead Museum, which is a collection of homestead-era buildings moved there from the surrounding area, starting in 1988. The museum was created by the Fort Rock Valley Historical Society to preserve historic buildings that were in danger of being razed by the Bureau of Land Management or were being vandalized in their remote locations. Buildings include a church, a log cabin, a doctor's office, a school, a land office, and several other cabins and houses.

== Climate ==
Fort Rock has a dry-summer Mediterranean climate with cold winters and warm summers featuring colder nights due to large diurnal temperature variations. Freezing temperatures can occur at any time of the year. There are on average 260 days annually where the temperature reaches at or below freezing (8 of them in July).

Climate data for Fort Rock, Oregon, 1990–2020 normals, extremes 1948-present
Month	Jan	Feb	Mar	Apr	May	Jun	Jul	Aug	Sep	Oct	Nov	Dec	Year
Record high °F (°C)	47.3 (8.5)	53.9 (12.2)	58.6 (14.8)	66.8 (19.3)	77.3 (25.2)	81.3 (27.4)	89.6 (32.0)	88.8 (31.6)	82.7 (28.2)	73.5 (23.1)	56.8 (13.8)	44.5 (6.9)	89.6 (32.0)
Mean daily maximum °F (°C)	38.6 (3.7)	43.7 (6.5)	48.5 (9.2)	57.5 (14.2)	66.5 (19.2)	74 (23)	84.4 (29.1)	83.1 (28.4)	75.7 (24.3)	64.3 (17.9)	48 (9)	39.3 (4.1)	60.3 (15.7)
Mean daily minimum °F (°C)	14.3 (−9.8)	18.2 (−7.7)	21 (−6)	22.7 (−5.2)	28 (−2)	33.9 (1.1)	35.8 (2.1)	34.2 (1.2)	28 (−2)	22.8 (−5.1)	19.1 (−7.2)	14.6 (−9.7)	24.4 (−4.2)
Record low °F (°C)	3.2 (−16.0)	3.9 (−15.6)	15.4 (−9.2)	17.6 (−8.0)	23 (−5)	28.8 (−1.8)	29.4 (−1.4)	28.7 (−1.8)	22.6 (−5.2)	16.1 (−8.8)	2.5 (−16.4)	−1.1 (−18.4)	−1.1 (−18.4)
Average precipitation inches (mm)	1.6 (41)	0.9 (23)	1.2 (30)	0.6 (15)	1 (25)	1 (25)	0.4 (10)	0.5 (13)	0.4 (10)	0.7 (18)	1.5 (38)	1.9 (48)	11.7 (296)
Average snowfall inches (cm)	11.4 (29)	7.5 (19)	5.3 (13)	2.1 (5.3)	0.7 (1.8)	0.0 (0.0)	0.0 (0.0)	0.0 (0.0)	0.0 (0.0)	0.6 (1.5)	4.3 (11)	9.8 (25)	41.7 (105.6)
Average precipitation days (≥ 0.01 in)	9	7	7	6	6	6	3	2	3	4	7	8	68
Source: Weatherbase
