= Hole-in-the-Ground =

Volcanic explosion crater (Maar) in Oregon, USA

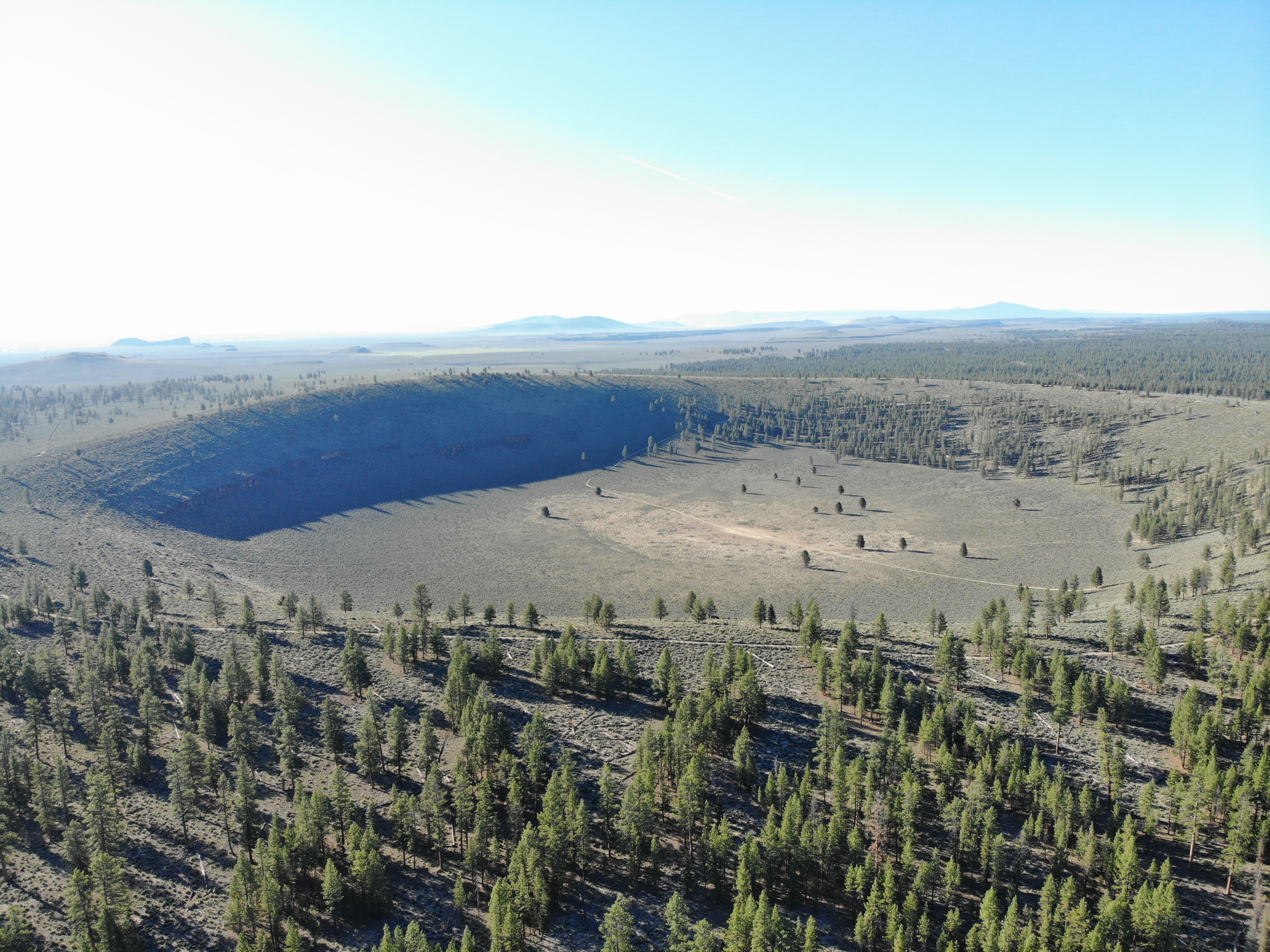

Highest point
- Elevation: 4,650 ft (1,420 m)
- Coordinates: 43°24′10″N 121°11′54″W

Geography
- Location within Oregon
- Location: Lake County, Oregon, U.S.
- Parent range: Cascades
- Topo map: USGS Hole In The Ground

Geology
- Mountain type: maar
- Last eruption: about 50,000 to 100,000 years ago

Hole-in-the-Ground is a large maar (volcanic explosion crater) in the Fort Rock–Christmas Lake Valley basin of Lake County, central Oregon, northeast of Crater Lake, near Oregon Route 31.

It is about 1.0 mile (1,600 m) across, a little longer N-S than E-W. Its floor is about 150 meters (490 ft) below the surrounding ground level and has a rim that rises 35 to 65 meters (110 to 210 ft) above, the highest point on the east side. The crater formed during the late Pleistocene, between 13,500 and 18,000 years ago, at which time the Fort Rock basin was a lake and the location was near the shore. Basaltic magma intruding near the surface flashed ground water to steam, which blew out overlying rock and soil, along with some juvenile material. As material slid into the hole formed, it closed the vent and the process repeated, eventually forming the huge hole. Blocks as large as 26 feet (8 m) in size were flung as far as 2.3 miles (3.7 km) from the crater.

To the west of Hole-in-the-Ground is an even bigger maar, 1.1 miles (1,820 m), but older and more eroded, called Big Hole.

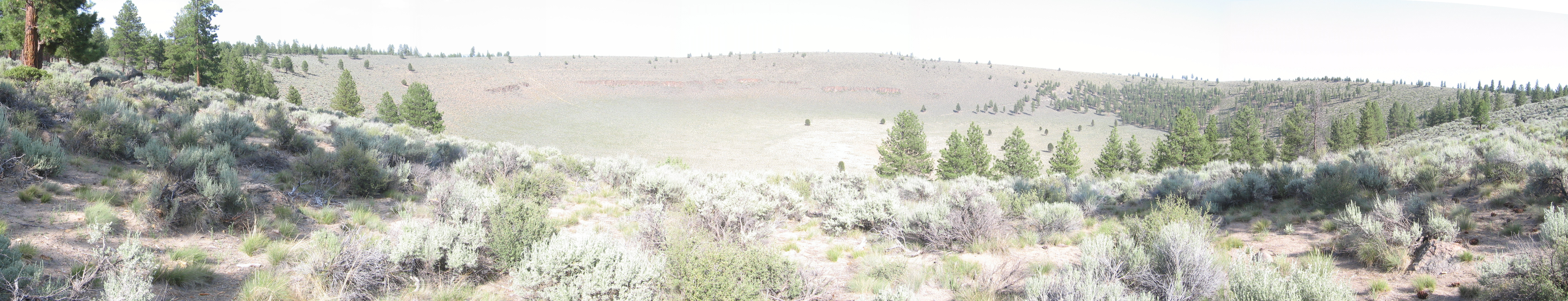

== See also ==
- Crack in the Ground
