= Fort Rock–Christmas Lake Valley basin =

- maar field
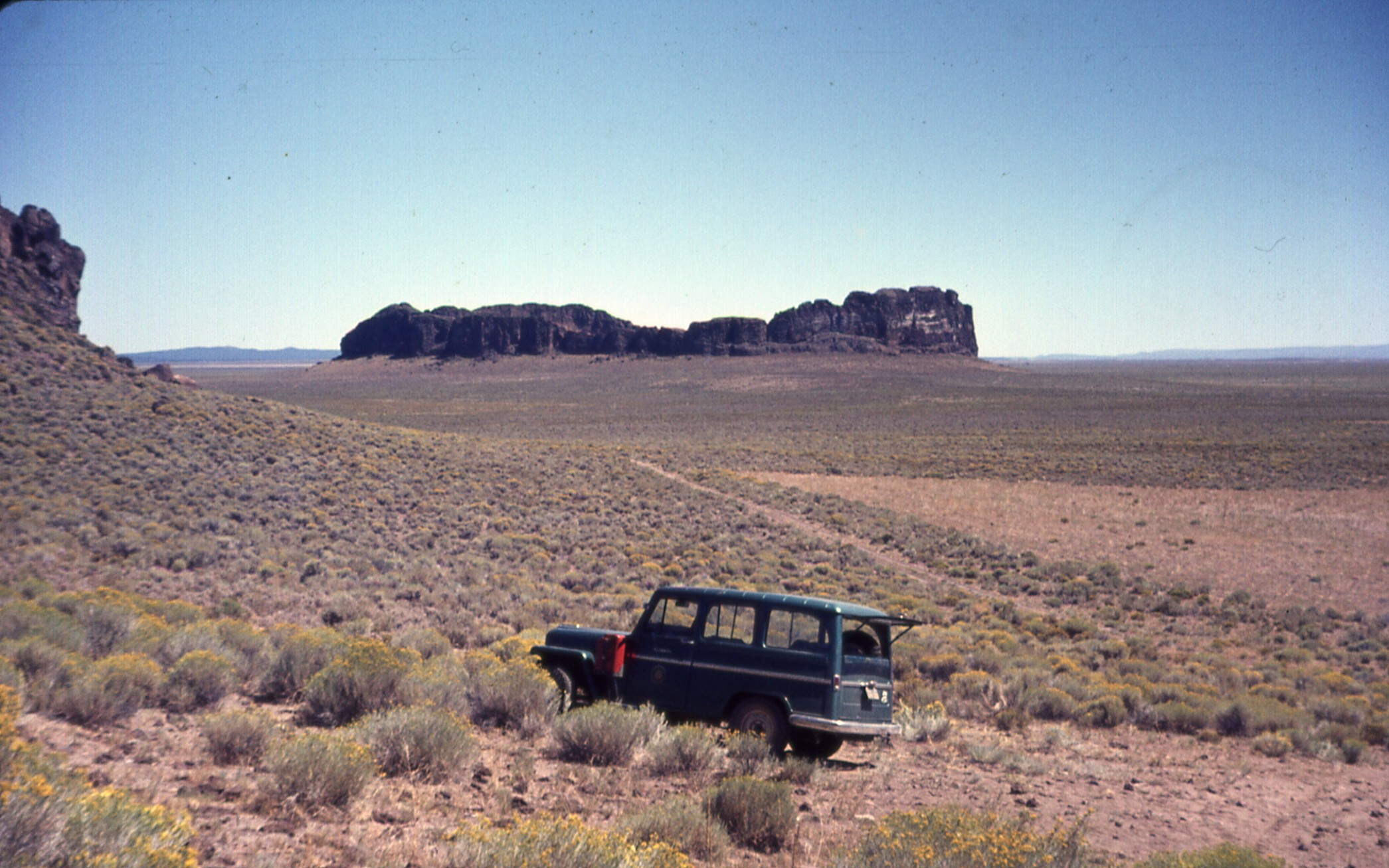
- Fort Rock and its basin

- Location within Oregon
- Coordinates: 43°18′N 121°00′W
- Location: Lake County, Oregon, United States
- Age: About 50,000 to 100,000 years old
- Elevation: 4,331–5,630 ft (1,320–1,716 m)
- Last eruption: About 50,000 years ago

Fort Rock–Christmas Lake Valley is a basin of a former inland sea that existed in that region from Pliocene through late Pleistocene time.

The Fort Rock basin maar field includes over 30 hydrovolcanic landforms spread over an area of 1,500 square miles (4,000 km^{2}). During the Pleistocene and early Holocene, Paleolake Fort Rock encompassed the entire basin.

== Paleolake Fort Rock ==
Paleolake Fort Rock
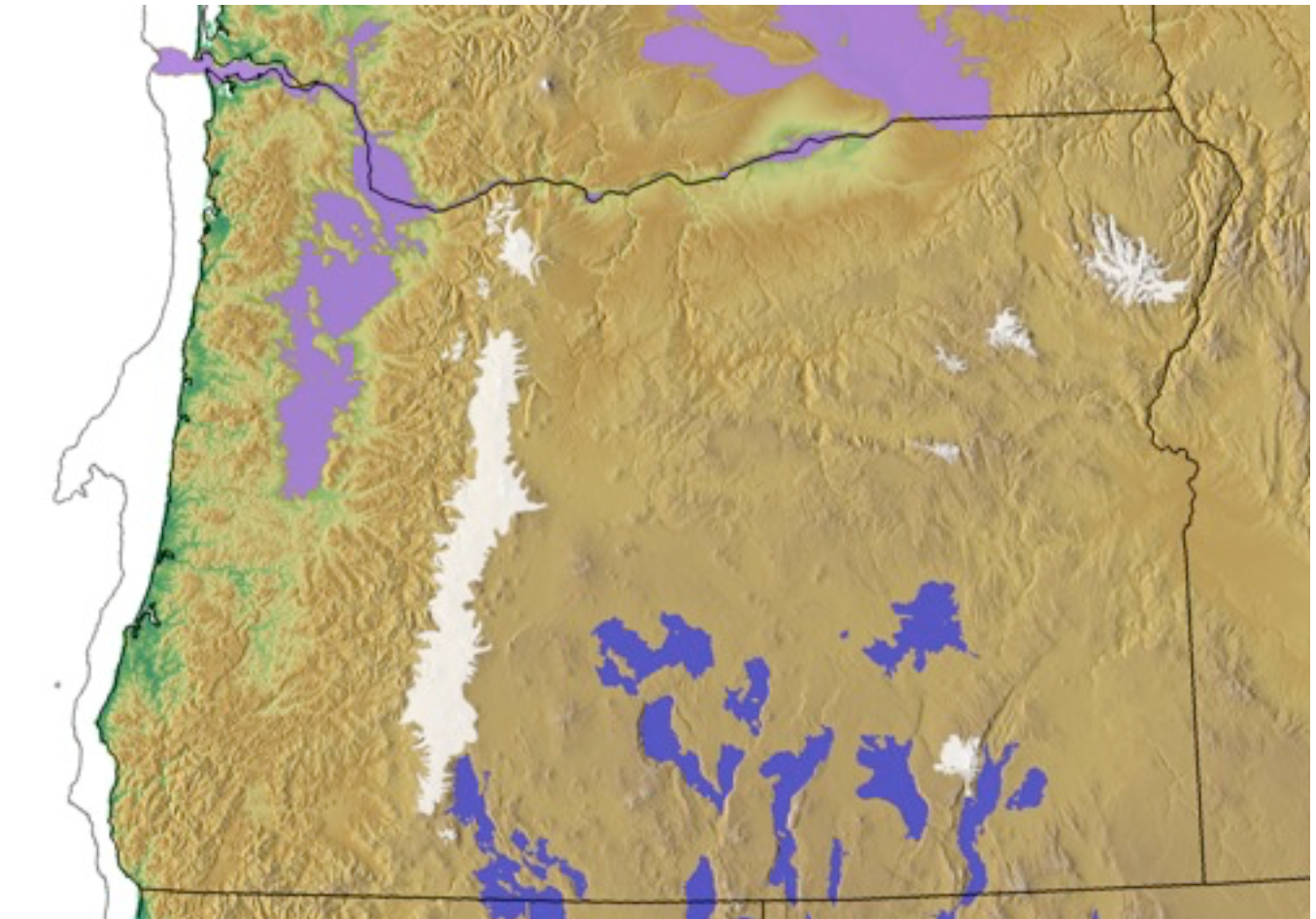
- Oregon Pleistocene geography. Blue areas are pluvial lakes, purple areas are Missoula Flood deposits, and white areas indicate maximum ice extent during the Glacial Maximum.

- Location of Fort Rock–Christmas Lake Valley basin
- Location: Oregon
- Coordinates: 43°18′N 121°00′W
- Type: Endorheic pluvial lake
- Surface area: 2,300 kilometres (1,400 mi)^{2}
- Max. depth: 75 metres (246 ft)
- Surface elevation: 1,384 metres (4,541 ft)

The Fort Rock basin is an endorheic basin. Increased moisture in this semiarid environment during the Pleistocene through increased cloud cover and cooler temperatures resulted in higher lake levels. At its maximum, the lake filled the basin up to 75 m deep (245 ft), with a surface area of over 2,300 km^{2} (900 mi^{2}). While this is larger than any modern lakes in Oregon, Paleolake Fort Rock was smaller than any of the other paleolakes to the south.

There are four major shorelines of Fort Rock basin from the paleolake. These shorelines are identified through recording wave-cut and depositional terraces, lagoons, and convex sedimentary deposits such as bars, spits, and beach ridges. The floor of the Fort Rock basin is relatively flat at around 1,315 m (4,315 ft) throughout much of the basin, so the depths of the lake at each level were fairly consistent.

The highest shoreline at 1,384 m (4,540 ft) is best seen at Fandango Canyon, but traces of beach sediments and wave-washed scarps have also been identified at Cougar Mountain and the southern end of the Connley Hills. The lake had an average depth of 70 meters (230 feet), with a maximum depth of 76 meters (250 feet) at the eastern edge of the basin. The Connley Hills and Buchgrass Butte formed two major islands.

The next shoreline at 1,364–67 m (4,475–85 ft) is seen at only a few places in the Fort Rock basin, such as Fandango Canyon and Cougar Mountain. This level formed the caves at the top of the southern toe of the Connley Hills. The lake was 52 meters (170 feet) deep at this level and covered an area of 1,945 km^{2} (1208 mi^{2}). The only islands exposed were the Connely Hills, Buchgrass Butte, and the Fort Rock tuff ring.

The 1,353–1356 m (4,440–4450 ft) shoreline is the most strongly developed, as it carved the notches in Fort Rock and the caves in the Connley Hills and Cougar Mountain. The lake was, on average, 38 meters (125 feet) deep and covered 1736 km^{2} (1078 mi^{2}).

The lowest shoreline at 1,332 m (4,370 ft) is seen as wave-washed cliffs at Flatiron Ridge and beach ridges and bars all over the basin. The lake was relatively shallow at about 17 meters (55 feet) deep and 1323 km^{2} (511 mi^{2}). This level was almost 1000 km^{2} smaller than the lake at its high stand.

== Archaeology ==
=== Fort Rock Cave ===
Prior to the excavation of the Paisley Caves, Fort Rock Cave was the earliest evidence of human occupation in Oregon. The cave was initially excavated by Luther Cressman in 1938 and during this summer his team discovered numerous well preserved sagebrush-bark sandals. This collection has been named the oldest-dated footwear, as the oldest sandal dates to around 10,000 years old. The cave is located approximately 1.5 miles (2.4 km) west of Fort Rock near Fort Rock State Natural Area in Lake County. Fort Rock Cave was declared a National Historic Landmark in 1961, and added to the National Register of Historic Places in 1966.

=== Connley Caves ===
The Connley Caves are six wave-cut notches in the Connley Hills that have been intermittently occupied from at least 11,200 BP to 3,140 BP. Volcanic ash from the Mazama eruption created a notable layer dating to 6,850 BP that was found in all the caves. The pre-Mazama archaeological deposits were rich in the bones of marshland animals, including birds such as ducks, sage-grouse, and grebes, small mammals like rabbits, gophers, and ground squirrels, and large animals such as pronghorn antelope, elk, and bison. These animals provide evidence for the previous wetland environment at the Connley Caves. Pine charcoal below the Mazama layer is an additional environmental indicator, as the tree only grows at cooler, wetter elevations. Artifacts from 11,000 BP to 7,000 BP show that the site was a popular camping spot. The assemblage consists of obsidian and fine-grain-basalt projectile points, knives, scrapers, drills, milling stones, cordage, and a variety of other items. Research is ongoing at the Connley Caves with the University of Oregon Archaeological Field School.

=== Carlon and Boulder Village ===
Carlon and Boulder Village are two boulder house sites in the Fort Rock basin. Carlon Village consists of a number of stone house rings that are visible on the surface. Three test pits near the houses encountered three floors, which contained fish, rodent, rabbit, and large mammal bone were dated to 2040, 1890, and 1780 BP.

Boulder Village is the largest of the stone house sites, with 122 stone rings visible on the surface. Excavations in 17 of the houses recovered 14 radiocarbon dates, ranging from 1510 to 100 BP. The artifact assemblage included projectile points, bifaces, unifaces, obsidian flakes, and ground stone tools. Seeds were recovered from flotation and include specimens of salt sage, chenopods, and juniper.

== Moffitt Butte ==
Moffitt Butte is a dissected basaltic tuff ring, 4,600 feet (1,400 m) in diameter and 400 feet (120 m) high. Moffitt Butte is not associated with a lake basin, as is the case for Fort Rock and Hole-in-the-Ground, but rising magma probably encountered permeable aquifers beneath the cone. A line of tuff rings between Moffitt Butte and the Fort Rock–Christmas Lake Valley basin are located roughly along what would have been an early drainage route between the Fort Rock basin and the La Pine basin. The crater floor of Moffitt Butte is about 260 feet (80 m) above the surrounding plain. A smaller vent and small tuff ring, 1,700 feet (520 m) in diameter, are located on Moffitt Butte's southwestern flank. The crater of the smaller vent is filled with lava that issued from a dike on its northwest edge.

== Table Rock ==
Table Rock is an erosional remnant of a tuff cone, which at present is a symmetrical cone about 5,020 feet (1,530 m) in diameter at the base, tapering to a diameter of about 1,180 feet (360 m) at a height of 1,180 feet (360 m) above the surrounding plain. The cone is capped with flat-lying basalt which once filled the crater, but erosion has modified the original cone, exposing the once ponded basalt lava lake. Dikes extend north and south of the crater's lava lake. On the lower flanks of the cone, the rocks are mostly palagonite lapilli tuff. Near the summit, the uppermost palagonites are overlain by massive cinders and bombs from fire-fountaining that preceded the filling of the crater with lava.

== Notable vents ==
Name	Elevation	Location	Last eruption
Big Hole			possibly 20,000 years ago
Black Hills			
Boat-Wright Ranch			
Flat Top			
Flatiron			
Fort Rock		43.37°N 121.06°W	50,000 to 100,000 years ago
Hole-in-the-Ground		43.41°N 121.20°W	50,000 to 100,000 years ago
Horning Bend			
Moffitt Butte		43.51°N 121.44°W	50,000 to 100,000 years ago
Reed Rock			
Ridge 28			
St. Patrick Mountain			
Sand Rock		43.37°N 120.32°W	50,000 to 100,000 years ago
Seven-Mile Ridge			
South Green Mountain			
Table Mountain			
Table Rock		43.17°N 120.88°W	50,000 to 100,000 years ago
Wastina Butte			
Wildcat Butte			

== See also ==
- Fort Rock
- Paisley Caves
- Rimrock Draw Rockshelter
- List of volcanoes in the United States of America
