= Peñon woman =

Paleo-Indian woman's skull found in Mexico City

Peñon woman or Peñon Woman III is the name for a Paleo-Indian woman whose remains, specifically a skull, were found by an ancient lake bed in Pueblo Peñón de los Baños in Mexico City in 1959.

== Discovery ==
Peñon Woman III was found on an island in the middle of Lake Texcoco.

The skeleton's age has been estimated by radiocarbon dating by Silvia Gonzalez of Liverpool John Moores University. Her ^{14}C date is 10,755±55 years (12,705 cal years) BP.

She is one of the oldest human remains found in the Americas.

Gonzalez theorizes that Peñon woman is related to the historic Pericú people of Baja California, who also shared similar physical traits.

== See also ==
- Archaeology of the Americas
- Arlington Springs Man – (Human remains)
- Buhl woman – (Human remains)
- Calico Early Man Site – (Archeological site)
- Cueva de las Manos – (Cave paintings)
- Fort Rock Cave – (Archeological site)
- Kennewick Man – (Human remains)
- List of unsolved deaths
- Luzia Woman – (Human remains)
- Kwäday Dän Ts'ìnchi – (Human remains)
- Marmes Rockshelter – (Archeological site)
- Paisley Caves – (Archeological site)
- Leanderthal Lady – (Human remains)
- Forensic anthropology
