= Luzia Woman =

Upper Paleolithic period skeleton of a Paleo-Indian woman

Luzia
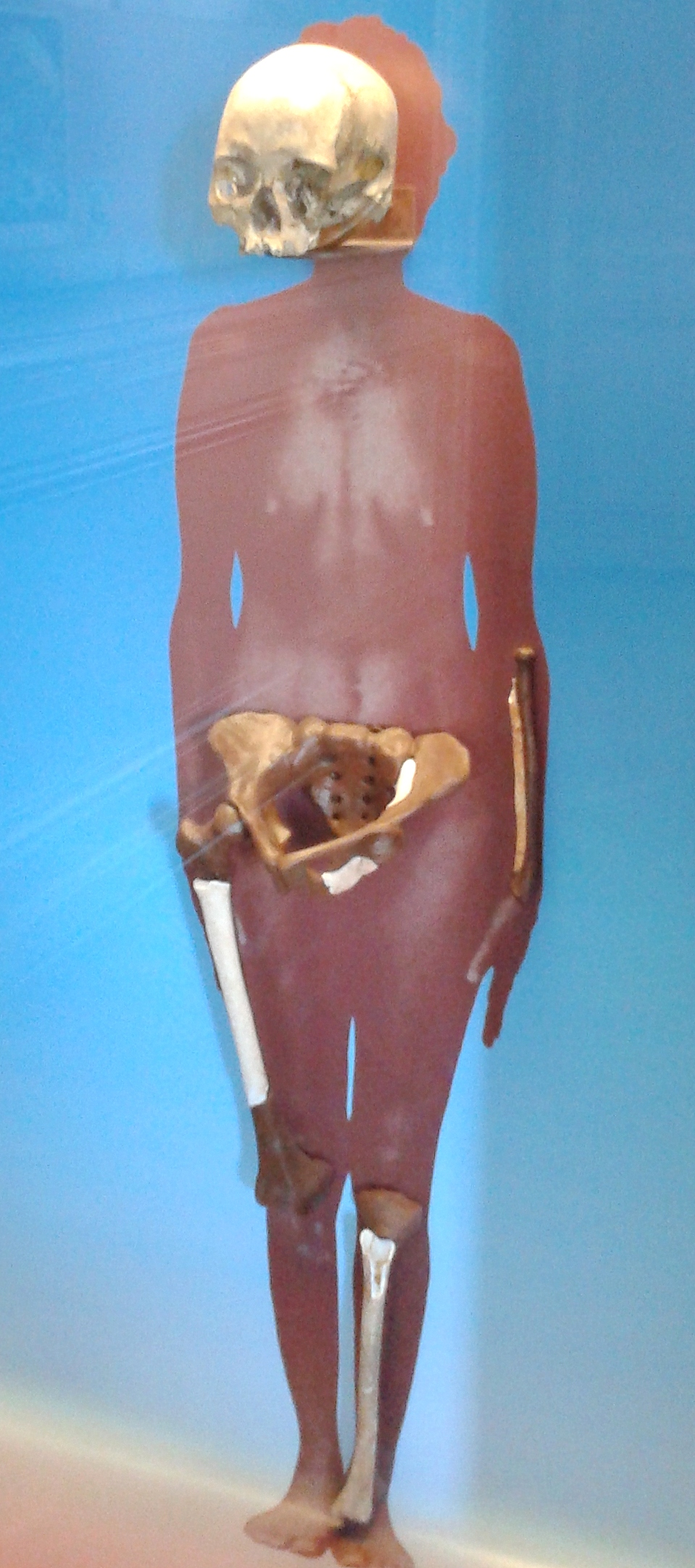
- Luzia's remains as displayed at the National Museum of Brazil in 2015
- Catalog no.: Lapa Vermelha IV Hominid 1
- Common name: Luzia
- Species: Homo sapiens
- Age: 11,243–11,710 cal BP
- Place discovered: Pedro Leopoldo, Brazil
- Date discovered: 1974
- Discovered by: Annette Laming-Emperaire

Luzia Woman (Portuguese pronunciation: [luˈzi.ɐ]) is the name for an Upper Paleolithic period Paleo-Indian woman whose skeletal remains were found in a cave in Brazil. The 11,500-year-old skeleton was found in a cave in the Lapa Vermelha archeological site in Pedro Leopoldo, in the Greater Belo Horizonte region of Brazil, in 1974 by archaeologist Annette Laming-Emperaire.

The nickname Luzia was chosen in homage to the Australopithecus fossil Lucy. The fossil was kept at the National Museum of Brazil, where it was shown to the public until it was fragmented during a fire that destroyed the museum on September 2, 2018. On October 19, 2018, it was announced that most of Luzia's remains were identified from the Museu Nacional debris, which allowed them to rebuild part of her skeleton.

== Identity and description ==
Luzia was a young Homo sapiens woman who died in her early twenties. She stood just under 1.5 m tall and was a member of a group of hunter-gatherers.

Her skull had a narrow, oval cranium, a projecting face, and a pronounced chin. When Luzia's remains were first studied in the late 1990s, these features appeared unlike those of later Indigenous peoples of the Americas. Instead, they were interpreted as more closely resembling those of present-day Indigenous Australians, Melanesians, and Negrito peoples of Southeast Asia. This interpretation led to the proposal that Luzia's ancestors represented an earlier migration into the Americas than the ancestors of later Indigenous American populations.

Ancient DNA studies published in 2018 told a different story. Genetic analysis showed that Luzia was genetically Amerindian and found no evidence of a close genetic relationship between the people of Lagoa Santa and populations from Africa or Australia. These findings did not support the earlier hypothesis of a separate Australo-Melanesian migration into the Americas.

== Discovery ==
Luzia's remains were discovered in 1974 during excavations at Lapa Vermelha IV, a rock shelter near Pedro Leopoldo, Minas Gerais, Brazil. The excavation was led by French archaeologist Annette Laming-Emperaire as part of a joint French–Brazilian research expedition. The remains were recovered from a sedimentary deposit approximately 12 metres (40 ft) below the surface of the shelter.

The skull had become separated from the rest of the skeleton before excavation, but was reported to be in good condition when recovered. Approximately one-third of the skeleton survived, and no other human remains were found at the site.

Charcoal was recovered from the same deposit as the skeleton, and flint tools were found nearby. Unlike later formal burials from Lagoa Santa, Luzia's body appears to have been laid in an extended position within a protected niche in the rock shelter rather than placed in a prepared grave.

== Dating ==
Luzia's remains have been dated several times since they were discovered. An early estimate published in 1998 suggested that she lived about 11,400 years ago.

In 2013, researchers re-examined charcoal recovered from the same layer of sediment as the skeleton using radiocarbon dating. The charcoal was dated to 10,030 ± 60 radiocarbon years before present, corresponding to a calibrated age of 11,243–11,710 years before present. Luzia is one of the oldest human skeletons discovered in the Americas.

== Preservation and reconstruction ==
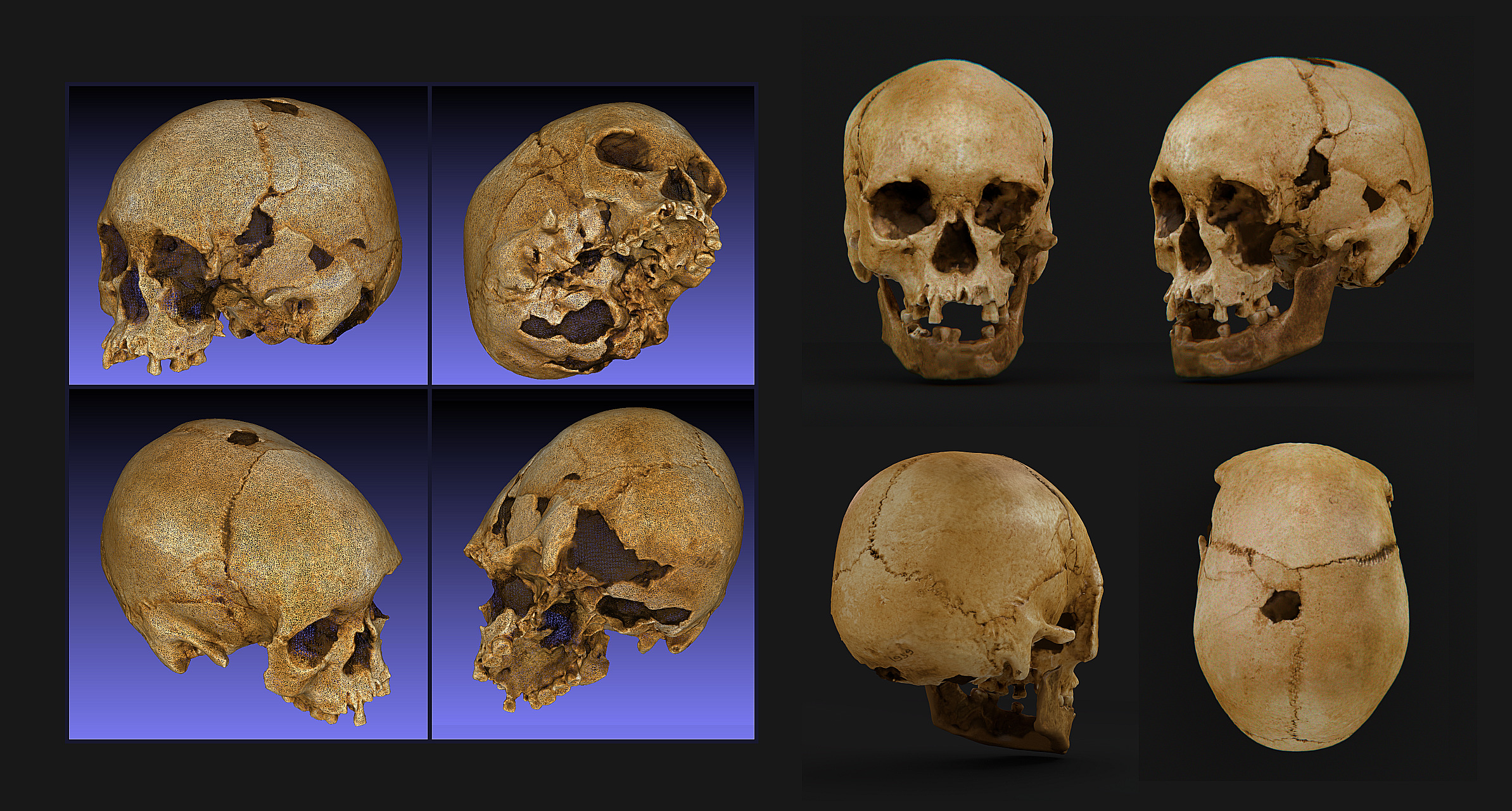
Photogrammetry of all skull sides by Cicero Moraes

After her discovery in 1974, Luzia's remains were displayed at the National Museum of Brazil in Rio de Janeiro for more than four decades, where they became one of its best-known exhibits. In 1999, a facial reconstruction based on her skull was created. The reconstructed bust was widely reproduced in books, museums, documentaries, and news reports.

On 2 September 2018, a fire destroyed the National Museum of Brazil, leading museum staff to fear that Luzia's remains had been lost. More than six weeks later, on 19 October 2018, museum researchers announced that approximately 80 percent of her skull had been identified among the rubble, together with part of her femur and fragments of the storage box that had housed the fossil. Although fragmented by the fire, the recovery of most of the skull made its reconstruction possible.

In the years before the fire, staff at the National Institute of Technology (INT), working with master's and doctoral students from the Federal University of Rio de Janeiro, had created detailed digital records of Luzia's skull using photogrammetry. These data were used to produce three-dimensional models and 3D-printed replicas of the fossil for research and public education.

== Phenotypical analysis and genotype ==
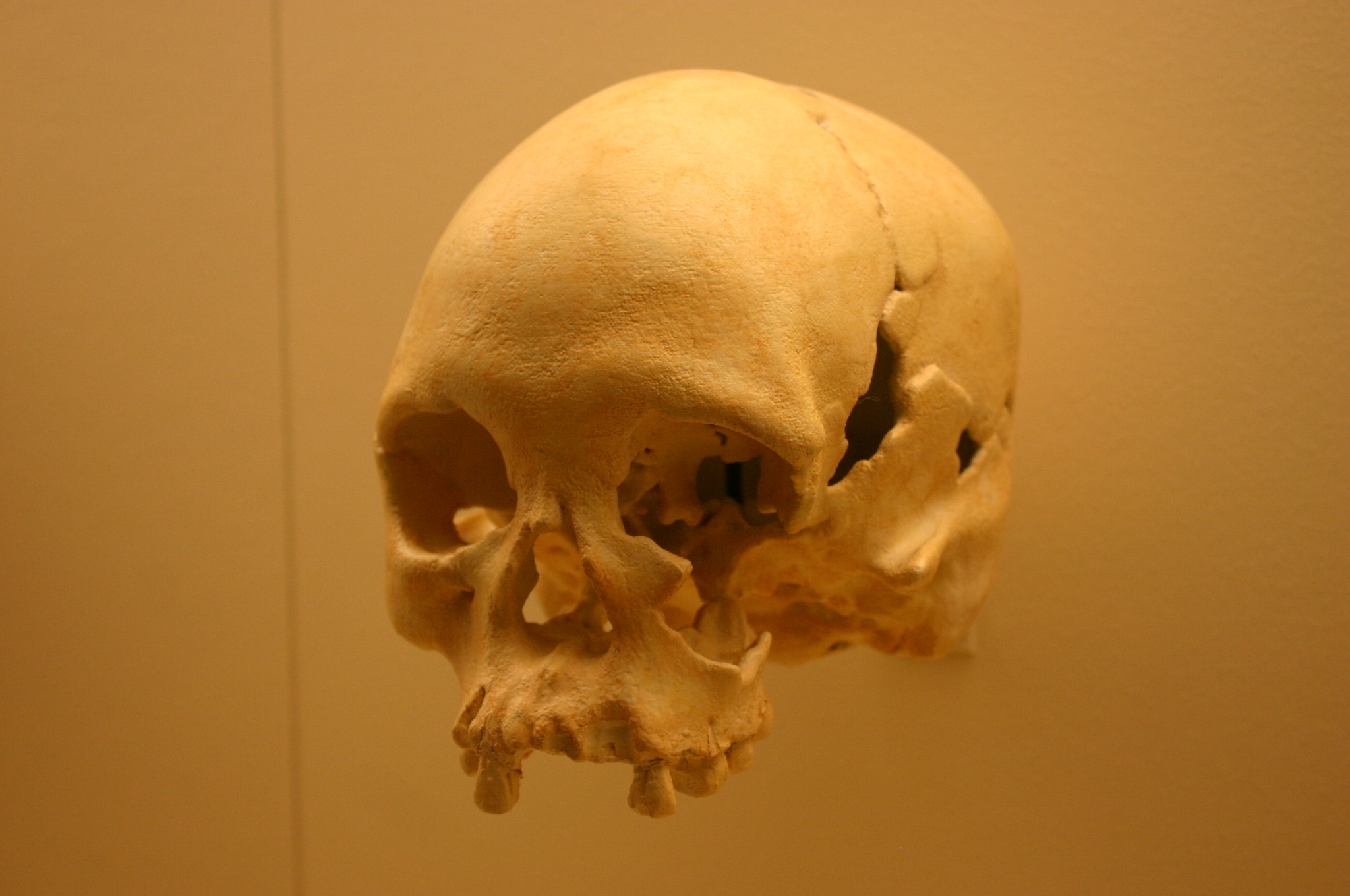
A cast of Luzia's skull at the National Museum of Natural History in Washington, D.C.

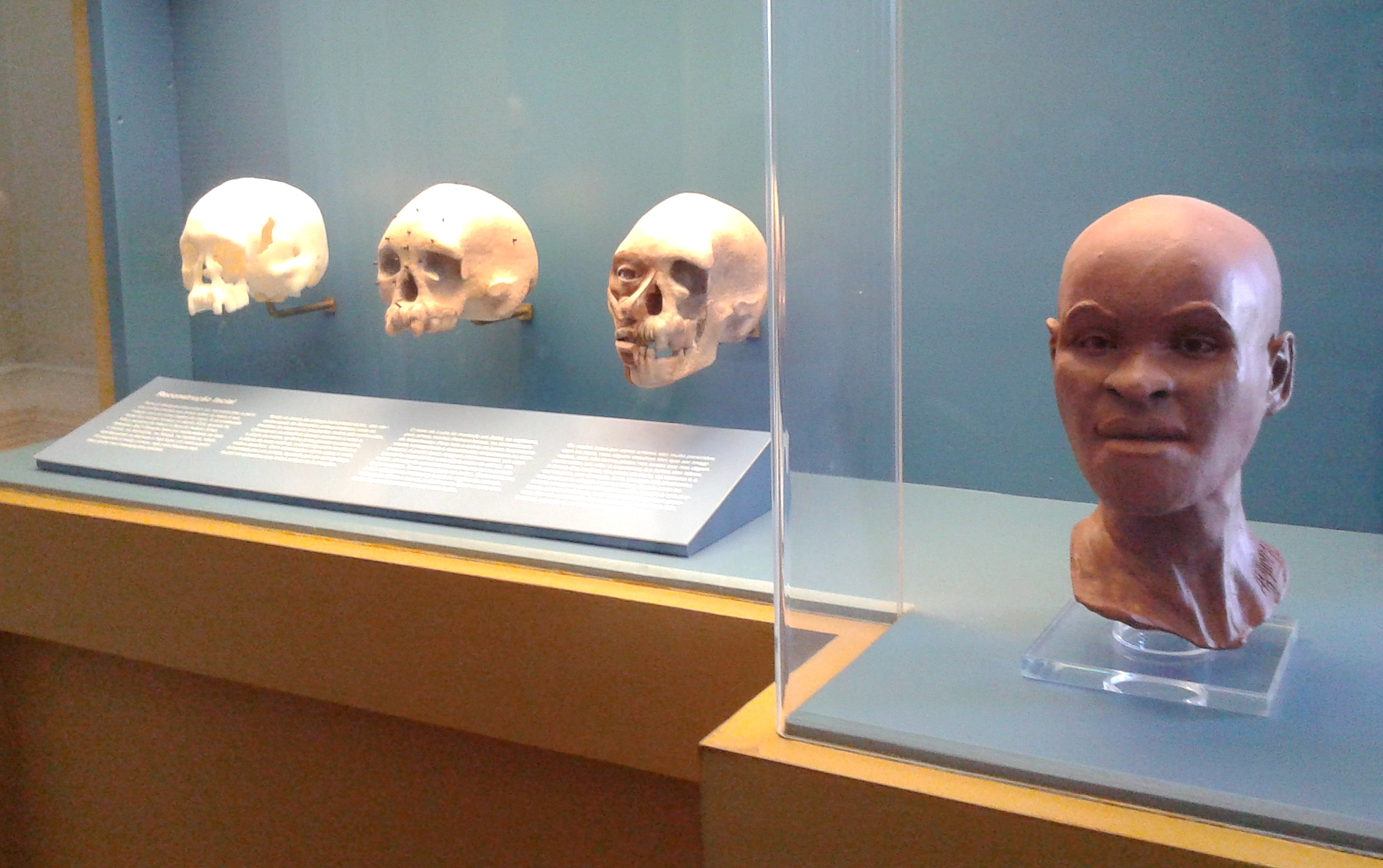
Facial reconstruction of Luzia completed at the National Museum of Brazil visible in this 2015 photograph

Neves and other Brazilian anthropologists theorized that Luzia's Paleo-Indian predecessors lived in South East Asia for tens of thousands of years after migrating from Africa and began arriving in the New World as early as 15,000 years ago. The oldest confirmed date for an archaeological site in the Americas is 18,500 and 14,500 cal BP for the Monte Verde site in southern Chile. Some anthropologists have hypothesized that a population from coastal East Asia migrated in boats along the Kuril island chain, the Beringian coast and down the west coast of the Americas during the decline of the Last Glacial Maximum. In 1998, Neves and archaeologist André Prous studied and dated 11,400 years for the skull of Luzia after naming her.

Neves' conclusions have been challenged by research done by anthropologists Rolando González-José, Frank Williams, and William Armelagos, who have shown in their studies that the craniofacial variability could just be due to genetic drift and other factors affecting craniofacial plasticity in Native Americans.

A comparison in 2005 of Lagoa Santa specimens with modern Aimoré people of the same region also showed strong affinities, leading Neves to classify the Aimoré as Paleo-Indian.

In November 2018, scientists of the University of São Paulo and Harvard University released a study that contradicts the alleged Australo-Melanesian origin of Luzia. Using DNA sequencing, the results showed that Luzia was genetically entirely Amerindian. It was published in the journal Cell article (November 8, 2018), a paper in the journal Science from an affiliated team also reported new findings on fossil DNA from the first migrants to the Americas.

Lagoa Santa remains from a site nearby to the Luzia remains carry DNA regarded as Native American. Two of the Lagoa Santa individuals carry the same mtDNA haplogroup (D4h3a) also carried by older 12,000+ remains Anzick-1 found in Montana, mtDNA haplogroup A2, B2, C1d1 and three of the Lagoa Santa individuals harbor the same Y chromosome haplogroup Q1b1a1a1-M848 as found in the Spirit Cave genome of Nevada. The bust of Luzia displaying Australo-Melanesian features was created in 1999. André Strauss of the Max Planck Institute, one of the authors of the Journal Science article remarked "However, skull shape isn't a reliable marker of ancestrality or geographic origin. Genetics is the best basis for this type of inference," Strauss explained. "The genetic results of the new study show categorically that there was no significant connection between the Lagoa Santa people and groups from Africa or Australia. So the hypothesis that Luzia's people derived from a migratory wave prior to the ancestors of today's Amerindians has been disproved. On the contrary, the DNA shows that Luzia's people were entirely Amerindian."

== See also ==
- Collection of fossils in the National Museum of Brazil
- Genetic history of indigenous peoples of the Americas
- List of unsolved deaths
- Settlement of the Americas

Human remains

- Arlington Springs Man
- Peñon woman
- Buhl Woman
- Kennewick Man
- Kwäday Dän Ts'ìnchi

Archeological sites

- Mummy Cave
- Paisley Caves
- Xá:ytem
- Calico Early Man Site
- Cueva de las Manos - Cave paintings
- Fort Rock Cave
- Marmes Rockshelter
