= Paleo-Indians =

Classification term given to the first peoples who entered the American continents

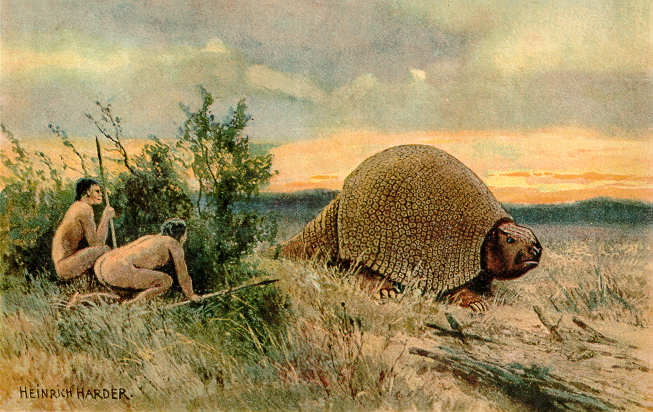
- Paleo-Indians hunting a glyptodont Heinrich Harder (1858–1935), c. 1920. The Paleo-Indians, also known as the Lithic peoples, are the earliest known settlers of the Americas; the period's name, the Lithic stage, derives from the appearance of lithic flaked stone tools.

Paleo-Indians (also spelled Paleoindians) were the first peoples who entered and subsequently inhabited the Americas towards the end of the Late Pleistocene period. The word comes from the prefix paleo-, taken from the Ancient Greek adjective: παλαιός, romanized: palaiós, lit. 'old; ancient', and "Indian", which has been historically used to refer to Indigenous peoples of the Americas. The term Paleo-Indian applies specifically to the lithic period in the Western Hemisphere and is distinct from the term Paleolithic. (Note: Paleolithic specifically refers to the period between c. 2.5 million years ago and the end of the Pleistocene in the Eastern Hemisphere. It is not used in New World archaeology.)

Traditional theories suggest that big-animal hunters crossed the Bering Strait from North Asia into the Americas over a land bridge (Beringia). This bridge existed from 45,000 to 12,000 BCE (47,000–14,000 BP). Small isolated groups of hunter-gatherers migrated alongside herds of large herbivores far into Alaska. From c. 16,500 – c. 13,500 BCE (c. 18,500 – c. 15,500 BP), ice-free corridors developed along the Pacific coast and valleys of North America. This allowed land animals, followed by humans, to migrate south into the interior of the continent. The people went on foot or used boats along the coastline. The dates and routes of the peopling of the Americas remain subjects of ongoing debate. There were likely three waves of ancient settlers from the Bering Sea to the American continent.

Stone tools, particularly projectile points and scrapers, are the primary evidence of the earliest human activity in the Americas. Archeologists and anthropologists use surviving crafted lithic flaked tools to classify cultural periods. Paleoindians lived alongside and hunted many now extinct megafauna (large animals), with most large animals across the Americas becoming extinct towards the end of the Paleoindian period as part of the Late Pleistocene megafauna extinctions. The potential role of human hunting in the extinctions has been the subject of much controversy. From 8000 to 7000 BCE (10,000–9,000 BP) the climate stabilized, leading to a rise in population and lithic technology advances, resulting in a more sedentary lifestyle during the following Archaic Period.

== Nomenclature ==
The term "Paleoindian" was first coined by Frank H. H. Roberts in the 1940 work Developments in the Problem of the North American Paleo-Indian to describe artifacts, not peoples. Robert used the term to describe archaeological assemblages that were perceived to be relatively old and were "adapted to conditions unlike those in modern times". A number of early adopters of the term, such as James Bennett Griffin in 1946, included archaeological assemblages now considered part of the North American Archaic period, contrasting it with the term "Neo-Indian", which Griffin used to characterise assemblages with technology resembling the Neolithic of the Old World. John Witthoft in 1952 saw Paleo-Indian as a technological stage that lacked "pecked and ground" stone tools.

The first author to use Paleo-Indian to specifically refer to the first inhabitants to the Americas was Hannah Marie Wormington in 1957, viewing them as those peoples who had lived in the Americas prior to 6000 years ago, who had lived alongside now-extinct animals and produced fluted stone points. According to The settlement of the American continents: a multidisciplinary approach to human biogeography, (2016) in contemporary North American archaeology the term "Paleoindian" is used to specifically refer to "(1) the earliest well-documented culture in North America, (2) the characteristics of sites and artifact assemblages, and (3) a particular economic livelihood".

== Migration into the Americas ==
Map of early human migrations based on the Out of Africa theory; figures are in thousands of years ago (kya)

Researchers continue to study and discuss the specifics of Paleo-Indian migration to and throughout the Americas, including the dates and routes traveled. The traditional theory holds that these early migrants moved into Beringia between eastern Siberia and present-day Alaska 17,000 years ago, at a time when the Quaternary glaciation significantly lowered sea levels. These people are believed to have followed herds of now-extinct pleistocene megafauna along ice-free corridors that stretched between the Laurentide and Cordilleran ice sheets. An alternative proposed scenario involves migration, either on foot or using boats, down the Pacific coast to South America. Evidence of the latter would have been submerged by a sea-level rise of more than a hundred meters following the end of the Last Glacial Period.

The time range of the peopling of the Americas remains a source of substantial debate. Conventional estimates have it that humans reached North America at some point between 15,000 and 20,000 years ago. However, some groups of humans may have reached South America as early as 25,000 years ago. One of the few areas of agreement is the origin from Siberia, with widespread habitation of the Americas during the end of the Last Glacial Period, and more specifically after the end of the Last Glacial Maximum around 16,000 to 13,000 years before present.

== Periodization ==
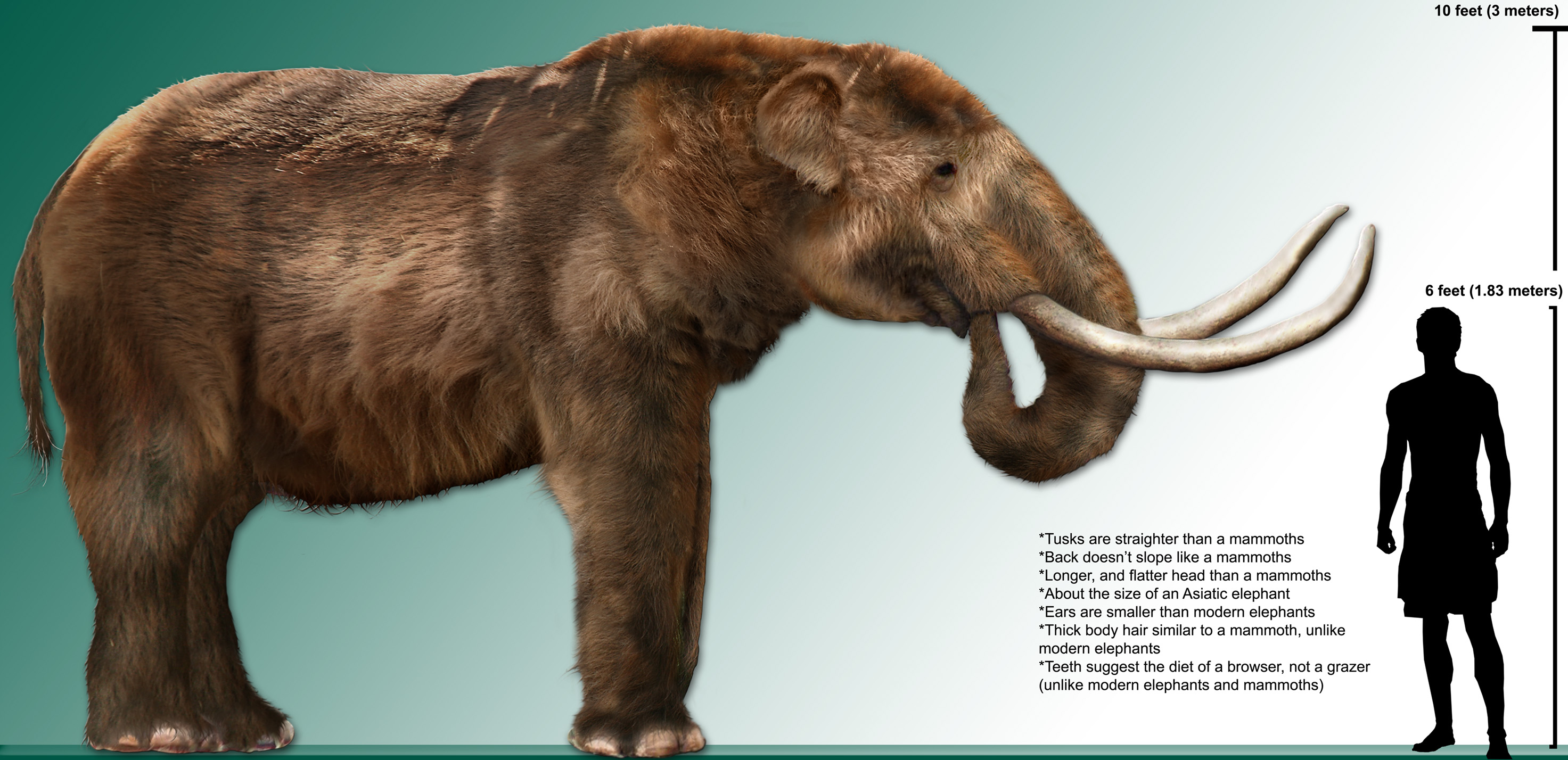
The Mammut americanum (American mastodon) became extinct around 12,000–9,000 years ago due to human-related activities, climate change, or a combination of both. See Quaternary extinction event and Holocene extinction.

The Palaeoindian period is generally considered to end around 9000 to 8000 years Before Present (abbreviated BP, a calendar system that treats the year 1950 AD/CE as year zero). The term "Paleoamerican" is sometimes used to refer to the pre-Clovis Paleoindian period, usually in a South American context, and with controversial connotations of the hypothesis of an earlier migration wave to the Americas prior to the arrival of the ancestors of modern Indigenous peoples of the Americas. Some authors have suggested that archaeological sites in the Americas prior to 13,500-13,000 years BP should be assigned to the Upper Paleolithic, which is then followed by the Paleoindian period.

Sites in Alaska (eastern Beringia) exhibit some of the earliest evidence of Paleo-Indians, followed by archaeological sites in northern British Columbia, western Alberta and the Old Crow Flats region of the Yukon territory. The Paleo-Indians would eventually flourish all over the Americas. These peoples were spread over a wide geographical area; thus there were regional variations in lifestyles. However, all the individual groups shared a common style of stone tool production, making knapping styles and progress identifiable. This early Paleo-Indian period's lithic reduction tool adaptations have been found across the Americas, utilized by highly mobile bands consisting of approximately 20 to 60 members of an extended family. Food would have been plentiful during the few warm months of the year. Lakes and rivers were teeming with many species of fish, birds and aquatic mammals. Nuts, berries and edible roots could be found in the forests and marshes. The fall would have been a busy time because foodstuffs would have to be stored and clothing made ready for the winter. During the winter, coastal fishing groups moved inland to hunt and trap fresh food and furs.

Late ice-age climatic changes caused plant communities and animal populations to change. Groups moved and sought new supplies as preferred resources were depleted. Small bands utilized hunting and gathering during the spring and summer months, then broke into smaller direct family groups for the fall and winter. Family groups moved every 3–6 days, possibly traveling up to 360 km (220 mi) per year. Diets were often sustaining and rich in protein; clothing was made from a variety of animal hides that were also used for shelter construction. During much of the early and middle Paleo-Indian periods, inland bands are thought to have subsisted primarily through hunting now-extinct megafauna. Large Pleistocene mammals included the giant beaver, steppe wisent, giant muskox, mastodon, woolly mammoth and ancient reindeer.

The Clovis culture, appearing around 11,500 BCE (c. 13,500 BP) in North America, is one of the most notable Paleo-Indian archaeological cultures. It has been disputed whether the Clovis culture were specialist big-game hunters or employed a mixed foraging strategy that included smaller terrestrial game, aquatic animals, and a variety of flora. Paleo-Indian groups were efficient hunters and carried a variety of tools. These included highly efficient fluted-style spear points, as well as microblades used for butchering and hide processing. Projectile points and hammerstones made from many sources are found traded or moved to new locations. Stone tools were traded and/or left behind from North Dakota and Northwest Territories, to Montana and Wyoming. Trade routes also have been found from the British Columbia Interior to the coast of California.

The glaciers that covered the northern half of the continent began to gradually melt, exposing new land for occupation around 17,500–14,500 years ago. At the same time as this was occurring, worldwide extinctions among the large mammals began. In North America, camelids and equids eventually died off, the latter not to reappear on the continent until the Spanish reintroduced the horse near the end of the 15th century CE. As the Quaternary extinction event was happening, the late Paleo-Indians would have relied more on other means of subsistence.

From c. 10,500 – c. 9,500 BCE (c. 12,500 – c. 11,500 BP), the broad-spectrum big game hunters of the Great Plains began to focus on a single animal species: the bison (an early cousin of the American bison). The earliest known of these bison-oriented hunting traditions is the Folsom tradition. Folsom peoples traveled in small family groups for most of the year, returning yearly to the same springs and other favored locations on higher ground. There they would camp for a few days, perhaps erecting a temporary shelter, making and/or repairing some stone tools, or processing some meat, then moving on. Paleo-Indians were not numerous, and population densities were quite low.

=== Classification ===
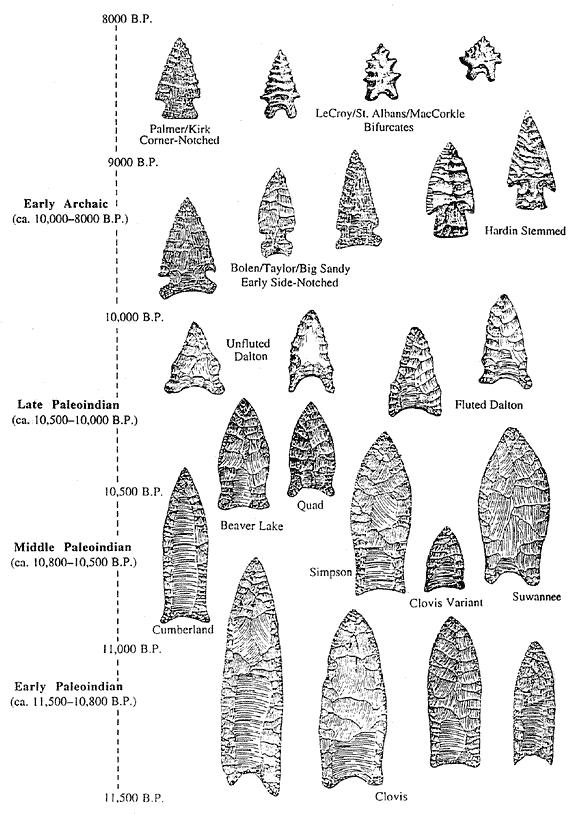
Different types of Projectile points, from the Paleo-Indian periods in southeastern North America

Paleo-Indians are generally classified by lithic reduction or lithic core "styles" and by regional adaptations. Lithic technology fluted spear points, like other spear points, are collectively called projectile points. The projectiles are constructed from chipped stones that have a long groove called a "flute". The spear points would typically be made by chipping a single flake from each side of the point. The point was then tied onto a spear of wood or bone. As the environment changed with the ice age ending around 17–13 Ka BP on short, and around 25–27 Ka BP on the long, many animals migrated overland to take advantage of the new sources of food. Humans following these animals, such as bison, mammoth and mastodon, thus gained the name big-game hunters. Pacific coastal groups of the period would have relied on fishing as the prime source of sustenance.

Archaeologists are piecing together evidence that the earliest human settlements in North America were thousands of years before the appearance of the current Paleo-Indian time frame (before the late glacial maximum 20,000-plus years ago). Evidence indicates that people were living as far east as Beringia before 30,000 BCE (32,000 BP). Until recently, it was generally believed that the first Paleo-Indian people to arrive in North America belonged to the Clovis culture. This archaeological phase was named after the city of Clovis, New Mexico, where in 1936 unique Clovis points were found in situ at the site of Blackwater Draw, where they were directly associated with the bones of Pleistocene animals.

Recent data from a series of archaeological sites throughout the Americas suggest that Clovis (thus the "Paleo-Indians") time range should be re-examined. In particular, sites such as Cooper's Ferry in Idaho, Cactus Hill in Virginia, Meadowcroft Rockshelter in Pennsylvania, Bear Spirit Mountain in West Virginia, Catamarca and Salta in Argentina, Pilauco and Monte Verde in Chile, Topper in South Carolina, and Quintana Roo in Mexico have generated early dates for wide-ranging Paleo-Indian occupation. Some sites significantly predate the migration time frame of ice-free corridors, thus suggesting that there were additional coastal migration routes available, traversed either on foot and/or in boats. Geological evidence suggests the Pacific coastal route was open for overland travel before 23,000 years ago and after 16,000 years ago.

=== South America ===
In South America, the site of Monte Verde indicates that its population was probably territorial and resided in their river basin for most of the year. Some other South American groups, on the other hand, were highly mobile and hunted big-game animals such as gomphotheres and giant sloths. They used classic bifacial projectile point technology, such as Fishtail points.

The primary examples are populations associated with El Jobo points (Venezuela), fish-tail or Magallanes points (various parts of the continent, but mainly the southern half), and Paijan points (Peru and Ecuador) at sites in grasslands, savanna plains, and patchy forests.

The dating for these sites ranges from c. 14,000 BP (for Taima-Taima in Venezuela) to c. 10,000 BP. The bi-pointed El Jobo projectile points were mostly distributed in north-western Venezuela; from the Gulf of Venezuela to the high mountains and valleys. The population using them were hunter-gatherers that seemed to remain within a certain circumscribed territory. El Jobo points were probably the earliest, going back to c. 14,200 – c. 12,980 BP and they were used for hunting large mammals. In contrast, the fish-tail points, dating to c. 11,000 B.P. in Patagonia, had a much wider geographical distribution, but mostly in the central and southern part of the continent.

== Archaeogenetics ==
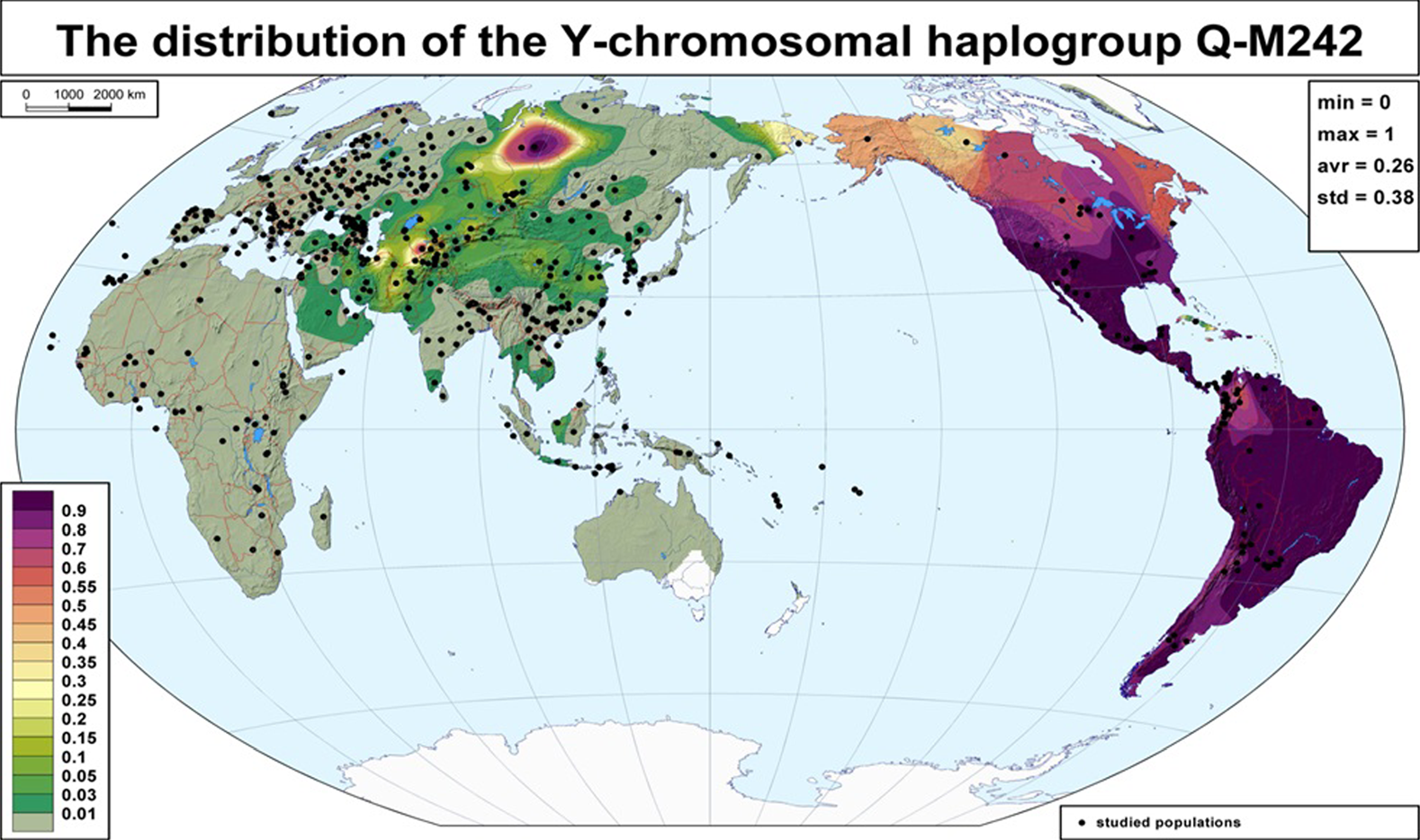
Frequency distribution of haplogroup Q-M242.

The haplogroup most commonly associated with Amerindian genetics is Haplogroup Q-M3. Y-DNA, like (mtDNA), differs from other nuclear chromosomes in that the majority of the Y chromosome is unique and does not recombine during meiosis. This allows the historical pattern of mutations to be easily studied. The pattern indicates Indigenous Amerindians experienced two very distinctive genetic episodes: first with the initial peopling of the Americas, and secondly with European colonization of the Americas. The former is the determinant factor for the number of gene lineages and founding haplotypes present in today's Indigenous Amerindian populations.

Human settlement of the Americas occurred in stages from the Bering sea coast line, with an initial layover on Beringia for the founding population. The micro-satellite diversity and distributions of the Y lineage specific to South America indicates that certain Amerindian populations have been isolated since the initial colonization of the region. The Na-Dené, Inuit and Indigenous Alaskan populations, however, exhibit haplogroup Q (Y-DNA) mutations that are distinct from other Amerindians with various mtDNA mutations. This suggests that the earliest migrants into the northern extremes of North America and Greenland derived from later migrant populations.

Evidence from full genomic studies suggests that the first people in the Americas diverged from Ancient East Asians about 36,000 years ago and expanded northwards into Siberia, where they encountered and interacted with a different Paleolithic Siberian population (known as Ancient North Eurasians), giving rise to both Paleosiberian peoples and Ancient Native Americans, which later migrated towards the Beringian region, became isolated from other populations, and subsequently populated the Americas.

== Debate about megafauna extinction ==
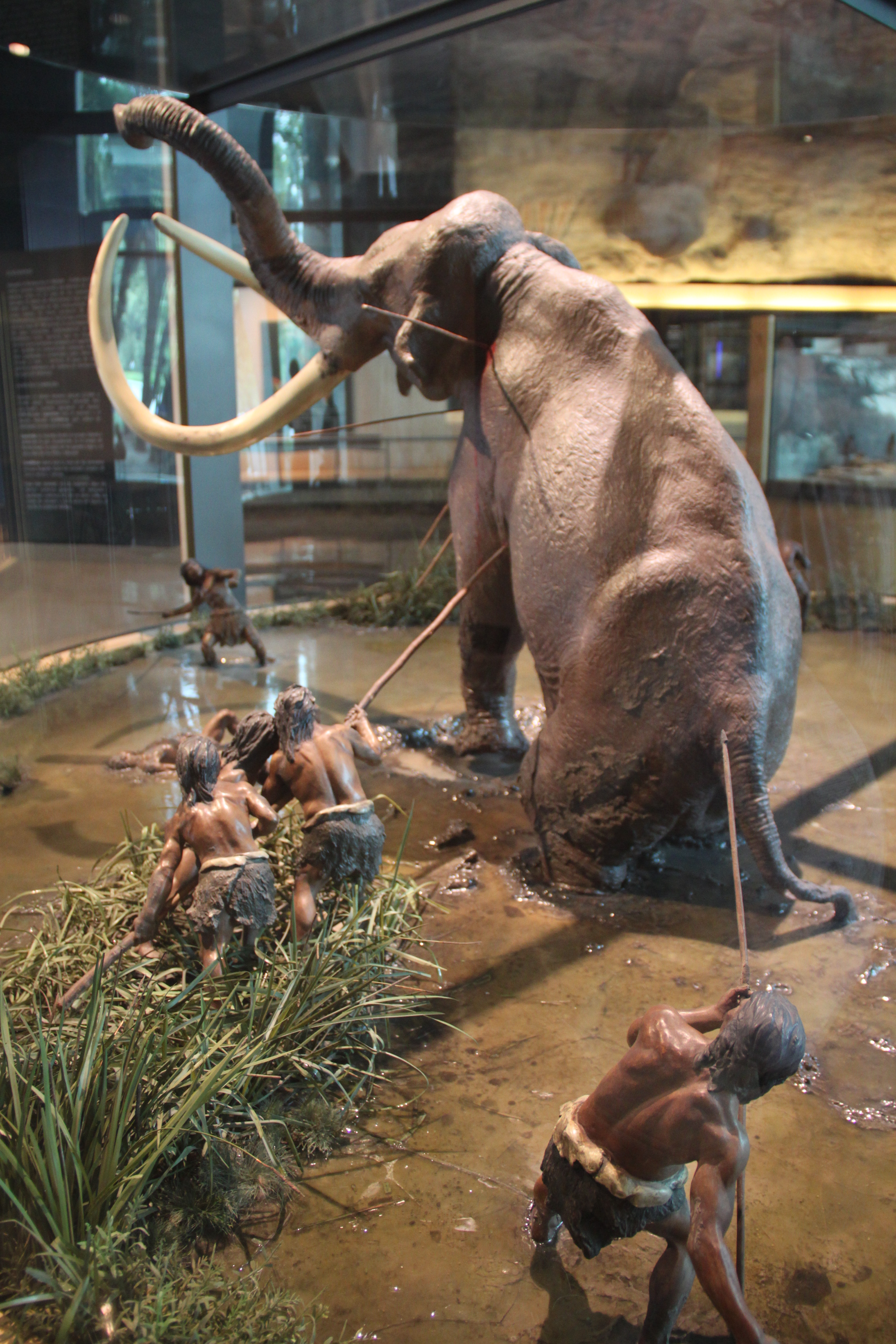
Diorama of a Paleoindian Columbian mammoth (Mammuthus columbi) hunting scene at the National Museum of Anthropology, Mexico City

Due to the evidence that Paleoindians hunted now extinct megafauna (large animals), and that following a period of overlap, most large animals across the Americas became extinct as part of the Late Pleistocene megafauna extinctions, it has been argued by many authors that hunting by Paleoindians was an important factor in the extinctions, though this suggestion is controversial, with other authors placing the blame on climatic change. In a 2012 survey of archaeologists in The SAA Archaeological Record, 63% of respondents said that megafauna extinctions were likely the result of a "combination of factors".

== Transition to archaic period ==
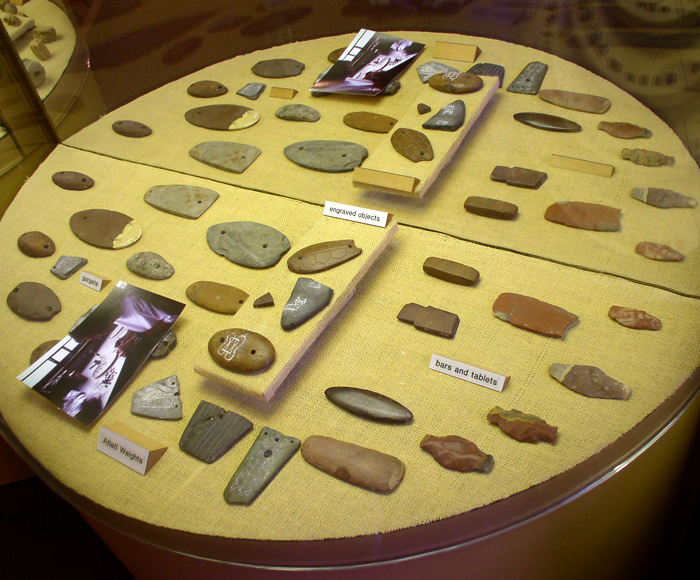
Atlatl weights and carved stone gorgets from Poverty Point

The Archaic period in the Americas saw a changing environment featuring a warmer, more arid climate and the disappearance of the last megafauna. The majority of population groups at this time were still highly mobile hunter-gatherers, but now individual groups started to focus on resources available to them locally. Thus with the passage of time there is a pattern of increasing regional generalization like the Southwest, Arctic, Poverty, Dalton, and Plano traditions. These regional adaptations would become the norm, with reliance less on hunting and gathering, and a more mixed economy of small game, fish, seasonally wild vegetables, and harvested plant foods. Many groups continued to hunt big game but their hunting traditions became more varied and meat procurement methods more sophisticated. The placement of artifacts and materials within an Archaic burial site indicated social differentiation based upon status in some groups.

== See also ==
- Adams County Paleo-Indian District – (Archeological site)
- Arlington Springs Man – (Human remains)
- Blackwater Draw – (Archeological site)
- Borax Lake Site – (Archeological site)
- Buhl woman – (Human remains)
- Calico Early Man Site – (Archeological site)
- Caverna da Pedra Pintada – (Archeological site)
- Cody complex – (Culture group)
- Cueva de las Manos – (Cave paintings)
- East Fork Site – (Archeological site)
- Folsom Tradition – (Culture group)
- Fort Rock Cave – (Archeological site)
- Hiscock Site – (Archeological site)
- Kennewick Man – (Human remains)
- Leanderthal Lady – (Human remains)
- Lehner Mammoth-Kill Site – (Archeological site)
- Lindenmeier site – (Archeological site)
- Luzia Woman – (Human remains)
- Marmes Rockshelter – (Archeological site)
- Mastodon State Historic Site – (Archeological site)
- Mummy Cave – (Archeological site)
- Naia – (Human remains)
- Paisley Caves – (Archeological site)
- Peñon woman – (Human remains)
- Post Pattern – (Archaeological culture)
- San Dieguito complex – (Archeological site)
- Sandia Man Cave – (Archeological site)
- Upward Sun River site – (Archeological site)
- Witt Site – (Archeological site)
- X̲áːytem – (Archeological site)
- Quad site – (Archeological site)
