= Buhl Woman =

Skeleton of an ancient Indigenous American woman

The Buhl Woman was an Paleoindian Indigenous American woman whose remains were found in a quarry near Buhl, Idaho, United States, in January 1989. She is thought to have been deliberately buried. Radiocarbon dating has placed the age of the skeleton at 12,740–12,420 calibrated years before present, making her remains some of the oldest in the Americas, though the quality of the dating has been questioned.

== Discovery ==
Remains of the individual now known as Buhl Woman were discovered in January 1989 in a gravel quarry near Buhl, in south-central Idaho. The first bone noticed was her femur, or thigh bone, which workers found in a rock crusher. They notified the Herrett Center for Arts and Science, and more of her bones were recovered from the foot of an exposed bank of sediment about 5 metres (16 ft) high.

On January 18, archaeologists from the Herrett Center and the Idaho State Historical Society inspected the site. Buhl Woman's remains were at immediate risk: quarrying had removed material beneath the bank, and frozen soil was falling as it thawed in the afternoon sun. As news of the discovery spread, increasing numbers of visitors also made it difficult to protect the remains.

The unstable bank prevented archaeologists from digging down from above. Instead, they recovered her remaining bones directly from its exposed face while avoiding falling soil and boulders. Quarry workers handed over bones they had already collected after a front-end loader displaced them. Her skull, lower jaw, and a few ribs and vertebrae were still embedded in the bank. Archaeologists also sifted the fallen sediment through a screen to recover loose bones and artifacts.

== Condition ==
Analysis of the skeleton suggests that it had disarticulated after burial but prior to being discovered. Many of the bones from the lower half of the skeleton were not recovered and are thought to have been destroyed by quarrying.

== Scientific analysis ==
=== Body and health ===
An analysis of the skeleton showed that Buhla was between 17 and 21 years old, 5 ft 2 in (1.57 m) tall, and was in general good health.

=== Diet ===
Carbon and nitrogen isotope analysis of Buhla's bone collagen suggests that Buhl woman ate a diet high in meat, as well as anadromous fish like salmon. The wear patterns in her teeth indicated that the meat was cooked before eating. Her teeth showed signs of heavy wear caused by sand or grit, wear that would be consistent with the use of stone grinding or pounding. Defects in tooth enamel and lines of interrupted growth on her femur indicate periodic malnutrition. This nutritional stress could be seasonal and/or the result of childhood diseases.

=== Cultural identity ===
No genetic testing was done, and there is disagreement concerning the morphology of the skull. Anthropologist Todd Fenton of Michigan State University has indicated that the skull's morphology is similar to that of American Indian, while according to anthropologist Richard Jantz of the University of Tennessee, "She doesn't fit into any modern group but is most similar to today's Polynesians."

=== Clothing and associated items ===
Buhla's right cheek lay atop a pressure-flaked, pointed obsidian tool. Since this tool shows no sign of wear, and since the positioning of this tool seems deliberate, it has been theorized that it was made as a grave offering. In addition, fragments from what could be an awl or pin and a broken bone needle were found with the skeleton, along with an incised badger baculum (penis bone). Like the obsidian tool, the eye of the bone needle showed no signs of wear.

=== Dating ===
Buhl Woman's remains were dated in 1991, two years after their discovery. Researchers tested collagen, a protein preserved in her bones, using accelerator mass spectrometry, a method of radiocarbon dating. The result was 10,675 ± 95 radiocarbon years before present. After calibration, which adjusts for changes in atmospheric carbon over time, this placed her death approximately 12,740–12,420 calendar years before present, or roughly 10,800–10,500 BCE. "Before present" is measured from 1950.

Her burial has helped frame questions about when different stone-tool traditions were used in western North America. A stone tool found with her belongs to the Western Stemmed Tradition. Researchers have cited the burial as possible evidence that this tradition was used at the same time as the Clovis culture.

In 2021, archaeologist Christopher S. Jazwa and colleagues reassessed the radiocarbon result and questioned its reliability. The chemical composition of the tested collagen suggested that it had changed after burial, potentially making the result either too old or too young. Eating fish could also have made her bones appear older in radiocarbon testing, an effect known as a marine reservoir effect. These concerns did not establish a new date for her death, but they reduced confidence in the existing one. The researchers concluded that her burial could not reliably demonstrate an overlap between the two toolmaking traditions.

== Death ==
=== Cause of death ===
The cause of death could not be determined.

=== Reburial ===
The Buhl Woman was found on State land, not federal, so the Native American Graves Protection and Repatriation Act (NAGPRA) did not apply. She was repatriated under State of Idaho Statute, the general provisions of which are that remains determined to be Native American are to be returned to the nearest federally recognized Tribe, in this instance, the Shoshone–Bannock Tribes at Fort Hall. In 1992, the remains and the artifacts were turned over to the Shoshone–Bannock of Fort Hall over the strenuous objections of many archaeologists, and despite the lack of evidence linking the woman with this tribe. The tribe reburied the remains in 1993.

== See also ==
- Archaeology of the Americas
- Arlington Springs Man – (Human remains)
- Calico Early Man Site – (Archeological site)
- Cueva de las Manos – (Cave paintings)
- Forensic anthropology
- Fort Rock Cave – (Archeological site)
- List of unsolved deaths
- Kennewick Man – (Human remains)
- Kwäday Dän Ts'ìnchi – (Human remains)
- Luzia Woman – (Human remains)
- Marmes Rockshelter – (Archeological site)
- Paisley Caves – (Archeological site)
- Peñon woman – (Human remains)

== Books ==
- Green, Thomas J., Cochran, Bruce, Fenton, Todd W., Woods, James C., Titmus, Gene L., Tieszen, Larry, Davies, Mary Anne, Miller, Susanne J., "The Buhl Burial: A Paleo Indian Woman From Southern Idaho", American Antiquity, Vol. 63 No. 3, 1998, pp. 437–456.
- Silva, Samantha, Tarmina, Paul, "A Famous Skeleton Returns To The Earth", High Country News, (March 8, Vol. 25 No. 4), 1993.
- Slayman, Andrew, "Buhl Woman", Archaeology (magazine), Volume 51 Number 6, November/December 1998
