= Kwäday Dän Tsʼìnchi =

Mummy discovered in British Columbia, Canada

- Born: c. 1450–1700 AD; British Columbia, Canada
- Died: Summertime, c. 1450–1700 AD (about 20 years of age at time of death); Tatshenshini-Alsek Provincial Park, near the Yukon border
- Other name: Canadian Ice Man
- Website: Kwaday Dän Tsʼìnchi Project Introduction

Kwäday Dän Tsʼìnchi (Southern Tutchone pronunciation: [kʷʰətaj tən t͡sʼìnt͡ʃʰi]), also known as the Canadian Ice Man, is a naturally mummified body discovered in 1999 by a group of hunters in Tatshenshini-Alsek Provincial Park in British Columbia, Canada. Kwäday Dän Tsʼìnchi means "Long Ago Person Found" in Southern Tutchone. Radiocarbon dating of artifacts recovered with the remains indicates that the individual lived between 300 and 550 years ago.

DNA testing of more than 240 volunteers from the local Champagne and Aishihik First Nations identified 17 people who are maternally related to the ice man.

== Identity and dating ==
The young man who came to be known as Kwäday Dän Tsʼìnchi was estimated to have been approximately 18 to 19 years old at the time of his death. Radiocarbon dating of artifacts recovered with his remains indicates that he lived between approximately 300 and 550 years ago.

Following consultation with local First Nations communities after the discovery of his remains, he was given the Southern Tutchone name Kwäday Dän Tsʼìnchi, meaning "Long Ago Person Found".

DNA testing identified 17 living members of the Champagne and Aishihik First Nations who were related to him through their maternal line. Among them were Sheila Clark and Pearl Callaghan, two of seven sisters. Clark described learning of the connection as "extremely moving" and said, "I couldn't believe it."

Fifteen of the identified relatives belonged to the Wolf clan. Because clan membership is traditionally inherited through the maternal line, researchers have suggested that Kwäday Dän Tsʼìnchi may also have belonged to the Wolf clan.

== Final days ==
Evidence preserved in Kwäday Dän Ts'ìnchi's digestive tract, hair, clothing, and belongings has allowed researchers to reconstruct aspects of his final days with unusual detail. Because portions of his stomach and intestines remained intact, researchers were able to analyse his recent meals and trace some of his movements before death.

Analysis of his stomach and intestinal contents showed that he had consumed marine foods in the days before his death. Pollen recovered from his colon indicated that he was travelling during the summer, while the presence of beach asparagus suggested recent contact with coastal environments. Researchers concluded that he had travelled approximately 100 kilometres (62 mi) from the coast into higher elevations during the three days before his death.

Stable isotope analysis indicated that shellfish and salmon formed a substantial part of his long-term diet, while hair samples showed increased consumption of terrestrial meat during the months before his death. He wore a woven Tlingit x̱aat sʼáaxw made from spruce root, a tradition associated with the Northwest Coast, and a robe constructed from the pelts of Arctic ground squirrels, a material widely used in the interior.

At the time of his death, Kwäday Dän Tsʼìnchi was carrying walking sticks, an iron-bladed knife, a hatchet, and other personal belongings. Researchers believe that he died while crossing a high mountain pass in what is now Tatshenshini-Alsek Provincial Park. The cause of death remains unknown, although no evidence of serious injury was found and hypothermia has been suggested as a possible cause. Soon afterward, his body was covered by snow and ice, preserving his remains and many of the objects he carried for centuries.

== Discovery ==
On 14 August 1999, sheep hunters Bill Hanlon, Warren Ward, and Mike Roche were travelling above the treeline near the Yukon border when they noticed several pieces of worked wood emerging from melting ice. The hunters examined the wood and observed carvings and notches that appeared to be part of a backpack frame. As they searched the area more closely, Ward spotted the partially exposed remains of a young Indigenous man in the ice through his binoculars.

The remains were found at the edge of the Samuel Glacier in the southern Saint Elias Mountains, near the headwaters of Fault Creek in what is now Tatshenshini-Alsek Provincial Park. The site lies about halfway between the traditional Southern Tutchone village of Klukshu, in the Tatshenshini River drainage basin, and the Tlingit village of Klukwan, in the Chilkat River drainage basin.

The discovery was reported to archaeological authorities, who consulted with representatives of the Champagne and Aishihik First Nations before publicly announcing the find. Community members later gave the young man the Southern Tutchone name Kwäday Dän Tsʼìnchi, meaning "Long Ago Person Found".

== Condition and preservation ==
The remains had been dismembered after death, probably by shifting ice due to thermal cracking and slumping along the edge of the glacier. The first part found was the torso, with left arm and mummified hand still attached. The lower body was found a few meters away, with the thighs and muscle still attached. The head was missing, as were the right arm and lower right leg, though his hair, attached to some remnants of the scalp, and some small bones from the right hand and foot were recovered. Soft tissue was present primarily in the torso and thighs. The torso was of particular interest, as gastric contents could be analyzed to yield clues to the days leading up to the man's death. The skull was located in 2003, but was not removed from the site for study.

== Associated objects and clothing ==
Kwäday Dän Tsʼìnchi was found with a number of artifacts. He had a robe made from 95 pelts of the local arctic ground squirrel (commonly called "gophers") subspecies Spermophilus parryii plesius sewn together with sinew, a woven Tlingit x̱aat sʼáaxw (root hat) of split spruce root (probably Sitka spruce), and pouch or small bag of beaver fur containing a mass of lichen, mosses and leaves. Additional items included gaff poles/walking sticks, sticks for carrying salmon, a curved, hooked stick possibly used for setting snares to catch marmots, a "Carved and Painted stick" of unknown purpose, an iron-bladed knife with matching gopher skin sheath, and an atlatl and dart. The use of gopher skins for common household items, robes, and blankets had been important in the past, but the discovery of Kwäday Dän Tsʼìnchi helped revive interest modern day among the Champagne and Aishihik people in using these animals for their fur and skin. The find also inspired weaving workshops in the Klukwan and Yukon communities for teaching spruce root weaving.

== Genetic research ==
Following consultation with local First Nations communities, researchers obtained permission to conduct genetic testing on samples recovered from Kwäday Dän Tsʼìnchi. In 2000, researchers compared mitochondrial DNA from Kwäday Dän Tsʼìnchi with samples provided by 241 volunteers from the Champagne and Aishihik First Nations.

As part of the project, a partial mitochondrial DNA sequence from Kwäday Dän Tsʼìnchi was deposited in GenBank as accession number AF502945.

Representatives of participating First Nations communities remained involved throughout the research process and helped guide decisions about the treatment of the remains. After the genetic research was completed, the remains were cremated and returned to the region where they had been discovered.

== Conference ==
The find and studies generated great interest in Kwäday Dän Tsʼìnchi. In June 2005, the findings were discussed at a science conference on Rapid Landscape Change at Yukon College.

== See also ==
- Arlington Springs Man – (Human remains)
- Buhl Woman – (Human remains)
- Calico Early Man Site – (Archeological site)
- Cueva de las Manos – (Cave paintings)
- Fort Rock Cave – (Archeological site)
- Genetic history of Indigenous peoples of the Americas
- Kennewick Man – (Human remains)
- List of unsolved deaths
- Luzia Woman – (Human remains)
- Marmes Rockshelter – (Archeological site)
- Mummy Cave – (Archeological site)
- Paisley Caves – (Archeological site)
- Xá:ytem – (Archeological site)
