= Arlington Springs Man =

13,000-year-old Paleoindian found on Santa Rosa Island, California

Coordinates: 34.0061°N 120.1771°W

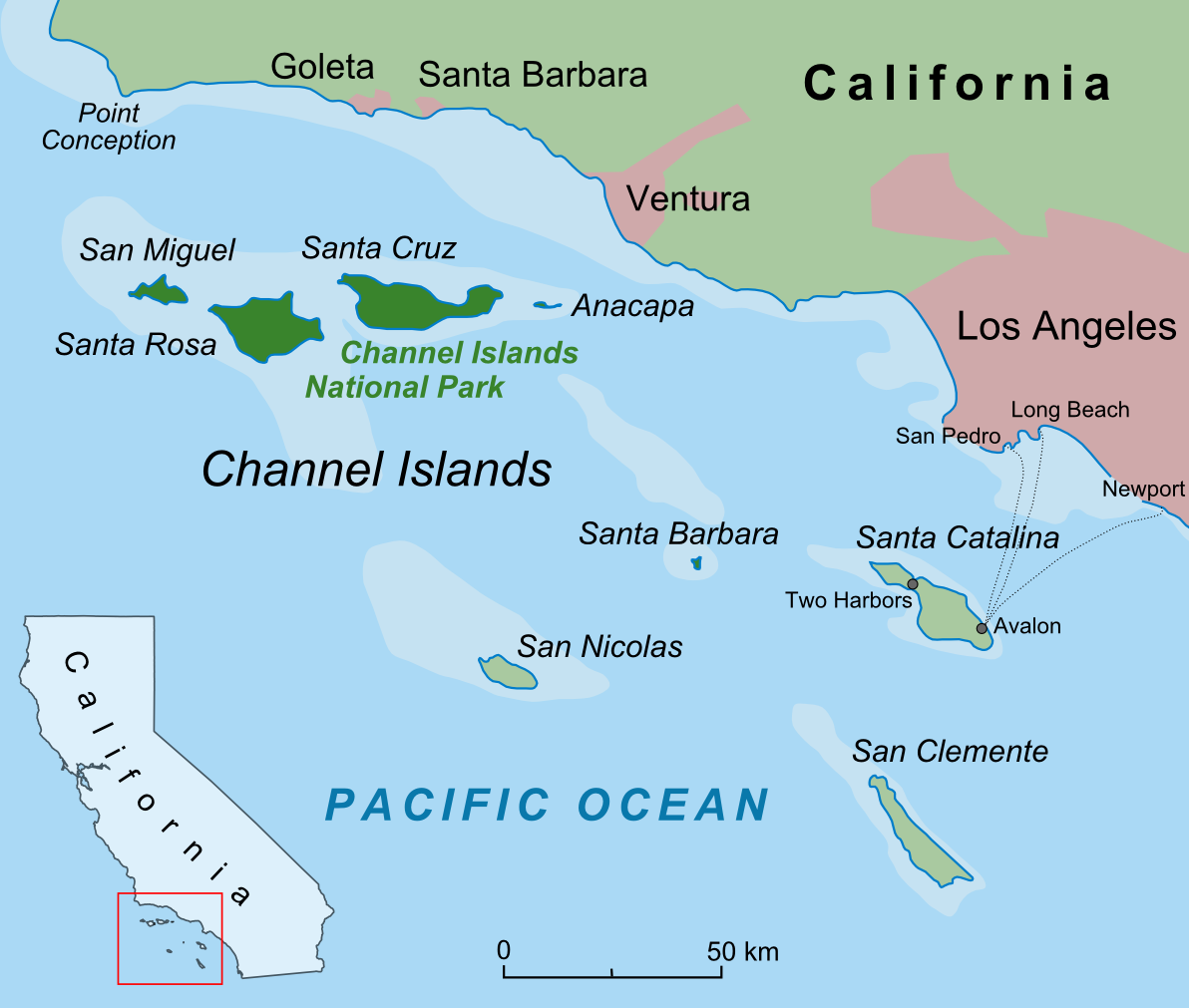
Californian Channel Islands map; Santa Rosa island is in the top left corner

Arlington Springs Man (Note: His historical name is unknown. A moniker was invented as a means of identification. Arlington Springs Man follows the practice of naming a discovery after the place it was found.) was an ancient Paleoindian, most likely a man, whose remains were found in 1959 on Santa Rosa Island, one of the Channel Islands located off the coast of Southern California. He lived about 13,000 years Before Present, making him the earliest dated adult in North America. (Note: "Scientists have found only about 50 skeletons of such antiquity, most of them fragmentary. Any new find can thus add crucial insight into the ongoing mystery of who first colonized the New World." "Remains of no more than 50 individuals have been found that can be said with confidence the predate 9,000 years BP.") It was an important scientific discovery because his presence on the island at this early date supports the coastal migration theory for the peopling of the Americas. In 2022, after a NAGPRA request, Arlington Springs Man was repatriated to the Santa Ynez Band of Chumash Mission Indians for reburial according to their native customs.

== History ==
In 1959, the socialite and philanthropist Kitty Harvey, granddaughter of Fred Harvey and heir of the Fred Harvey Company, funded an archaeology expedition to the Channel Islands. It was under the leadership of Phil C. Orr, curator of anthropology and paleontology at the Santa Barbara Museum of Natural History, who had been prospecting the steep bluffs of Arlington Canyon annually since 1946. Orr and his associates were in the canyon at a location called Arlington Springs, where according to his memoir he was "working" – scientists who knew Orr reported his jeep had become stuck and they were actually working to extract it. At this point, Orr looked up the canyon wall and noticed what he thought was a femur bone eroding from a cut bank, later determined to be about 37 feet deep from the surface. Orr understood that at this depth it was probably a very old bone. He pointed it out to his associates who did not think it was important and kept working, but according to Orr, without his insistence to investigate further, they probably would have passed it by. In this way the discovery was notable, according to Orr, for being so improbable.

Two femora and other unidentified bone fragments were found. They were radiocarbon dated to 10,000 years Before Present, using the relatively primitive dating technology available at the time. The area was once marshy and the man had died on the edge of a ciénega, a type of marsh common in the region. According to Orr's original paper the man may have died accidentally. Orr named him Arlington Springs Man, wrapped the bones in plaster, and stored them at the museum where they sat undisturbed and largely overlooked for the next 30 years.

Arlington Springs Man was later re-examined in 1989 by Orr's successors at the museum, John R. Johnson and Don Morris. Newer radiocarbon dating technology determined the remains were actually as old as 13,000 years Before Present, making him the earliest dated (adult) individual in North America. It was also determined the bones were from a female. The moniker was changed to Arlington Springs Woman, but after more time and study, in 2006 Johnson reversed his assessment, concluding that the remains were more likely those of a man. Author Stephen Fried noted that Kitty Harvey probably would have been delighted by the gender controversy because she was herself openly gay.

== Habitat ==
Arlington Springs Man lived on Pleistocene-epoch Santa Rosae island. The weather was much cooler and the sea level was 150 feet (46 m) lower than today. During the last ice age, the four northern Channel Islands were held together as the one mega-island of Santa Rosae. At the time the island was inhabited by Pygmy mammoths, which it is supposed the Arlington Man's people hunted, because at the same time full-sized Columbian mammoths were being hunted elsewhere in North America. The coastal regions of the island, which Paleo-Indians likely inhabited, has since been inundated by sea-level rise, meaning the location of Arlington Canyon was in the interior miles from the coast.

His presence on an island at such an early date demonstrates that the earliest Paleoindians had watercraft capable of crossing the Santa Barbara Channel, and lends credence to a coastal migration theory for the peopling of the Americas, using boats to travel south from Siberia and Alaska.

Six more field seasons have taken place between 1994 and 2008. No new human bones have been found, but chert microflakes derived from sharpening stone tools were discovered in the same soil layer that contained Arlington Man's bones, along with discoveries about other flora and fauna.

== Custody and reburial ==
Arlington Springs Man's remains were held by the Santa Barbara Museum of Natural History from the time of discovery in 1959. In April 2022, under the federal Native American Graves Protection and Repatriation Act (NAGPRA), his remains were repatriated to the Santa Ynez Band of Chumash Mission Indians. The claim was made by the tribe in October 2021, along with a request to return other Chumash items held by the museum. NAGPRA requires that Native American remains held in labs, museums, and private collections be repatriated to Native tribes if requested. According to the museum president, they were "honored to care for this important cultural heritage for many years and now find it deeply satisfying [to] transfer custody back to the Chumash community". Tribal Chair Kenneth Kahn stated that "These items have come home to our tribe, and it allows us to do the important work of repatriation and reburial."

== See also ==
- Archaeology of the Americas
- Buhl Woman – Skeleton of an ancient Indigenous American woman
- Calico Early Man Site – Archaeological site in California, United States
- Cueva de las Manos – Cave with paintings in Santa Cruz, Argentina
- Fort Rock Cave – Archaeological site in Oregon, USA
- Kennewick Man – Ancient skeleton of Indigenous American man
- Kwäday Dän Ts'ìnchi – Mummy discovered in British Columbia, Canada
- List of unsolved deaths
- Marmes Rockshelter – Archaeological site in Washington, USA
- Naia (skeleton) – Human fossil from the Yucatán Peninsula, Mexico
- Paisley Caves – Archaeological site in Oregon, USA
- Peñon woman – Paleo-Indian woman's skull found in Mexico City
