= Annette Laming-Emperaire =

French archeologist

- Born: 22 October 1917; Petrograd, Russia
- Died: May 1977 (aged 59); Curitiba, Brazil
- Occupation: Archeologist

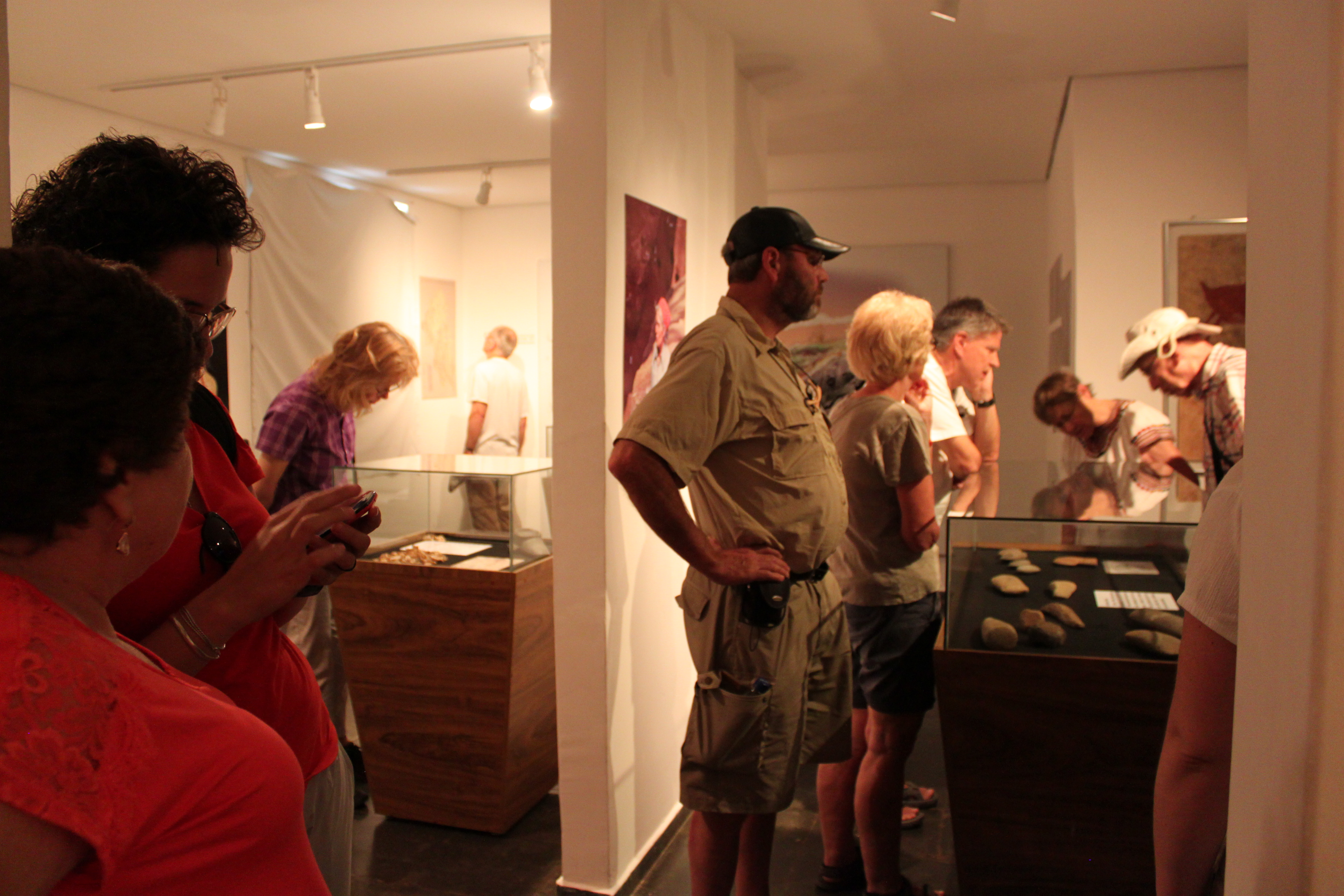
Centre of archaeology Annette Laming Emperaire

Annette Laming-Emperaire (22 October 1917 – May 1977) was a French archeologist.

== Biography ==
Born in Petrograd, as the daughter of French diplomats, 15 days before the Bolsheviks took Moscow she went with her parents to France. Annette Laming studied philosophy in Paris until World War II began. She then turned to teaching while participating in the French Resistance. After the war, she studied archaeology and specialized in cave art, her doctoral thesis, done under the supervision of André Leroi-Gourhan, La Signification de l'art rupestre paléolithique (published in 1962),

dismissed the various, too creative theories of its predecessors, and, with them, any residual nineteenth-century prejudice or romance about the "primitive" mind. Laming-Emperaire's structuralist methodology is still in use, much facilitated by computer science. It involves compiling minutely detailed inventories and diagrams of the way that species are grouped on the cave walls; of their gender, frequency, and position; and of their relation to the signs and handprints that often appear close to them.

She married a fellow archeologist, Joseph Emperaire, a student of Paul Rivet, who believed humans had come to South America from South Asia before reaching North America, and they began digging, looking for signs of early human occupation, in Brazil, Argentina, and Chile, where Joseph died when the wall of an excavation fell in on him. In the early 1970s, she returned to Brazil and selected six sites in the Lagoa Santa area, where the Danish paleontologist Peter Wilhelm Lund had dug a century earlier. She found a rock shelter at site IV where in 1974-1975 she discovered most of the fat bones of what was named Lapa Vermelha IV hominid 1, the oldest human fossil in Brazil, around 11 thousand years old. The skull was given the nickname Luzia. "Shortly after that, Annette Laming-Emperaire too died tragically. She went on a vacation in 1976 to the Brazilian state of Paraná, and was asphyxiated in her shower by a defective gas heating element." After her death, work at the site ceased until her assistant Andre Prous (who became a professor at UFMG) returned to Lapa Vermelha IV in 1979 to take over the project.

A memorial by a colleague called her "un des esprits les plus riches et les plus féconds de la recherche préhistorique française" ['one of the richest and most fertile spirits of French prehistoric research'].

The passage of the French researcher at region of Lagoa Santa, which includes, in addition to Lagoa Santa and Pedro Leopoldo, the municipalities of Matozinhos, Capim Branco, Vespasiano, Confins, Funilândia and Prudente de Morais, are at the Archeology Center Annette Laming Emperaire (Caale), of the Municipality of Lagoa Santa, in operation for 35 years. In Annette's team were researchers from the National Museum, where thousands of ceramic, lytic fragments and bones found in the excavations. The Franco-Brazilian mission in Lagoa Santa, under the auspices of the United Nations Educational, Scientific and Cultural Organization (Unesco), remained in the region between 1974 and 1976 and concentrated the excavations mainly in the Lapa Vermelha de Pedro Leopoldo. It was in this cave that Annette found "Luzia". In 1998, the "first Brazilian", as it entered the history, gained a face. When surveying collections of fossils in the museum, anthropologist Walter Neves, from the University of São Paulo (USP), made in-depth studies on the bones and provided the dating, which is 11,400 years. One of the great merits of the Franco-Brazilian mission, according to experts, was to rescue in the world scientific scenario the importance of Lagoa Santa, where Dr. Lund, in more than four decades, collected more than 12 thousand fossils, which were sent in 1845, to the King of Denmark. After Lund, the region, in the Lagoa Santa Cárstica Environmental Preservation Area (APA Cárstica), only attracted new glances in the 1950s, when researchers from the Minas Gerais Academy of Sciences and the National Museum in Rio de Janeiro resumed the excavations.

== Chronology of her excavations ==
- 1801 : »Born in Denmark, Peter W. Lund, who lived 46 years in the region of Lagoa Santa and is considered the father of Brazilian paleontology, archaeology and speleology
- 1832 : »Lund (1801-1880) makes the first discoveries of fossils in caves and coves of Lagoa Santa
- 1845 : »Lund sends to the king of Denmark the collection of fossils found in the region of Lagoa Santa
- 1950 : »Researchers from the Mining Academy of Sciences and the National Museum of Rio de Janeiro resume the excavations in the region
- 1974 : »Franco-Brazilian Mission, led by Annette Laming Emperaire (1917-1977), excavates until 1976 in Lagoa Santa
- 1975 : »Annette Laming finds in Lapa Vermelha IV the skull of Luzia Woman, the oldest human fossil with a Brazilian date. In addition to Luzia, thousands of archaeological remains were sent to the National Museum in Rio de Janeiro
- 1998 : »Bioanthropologist Walter Neves, from the University of São Paulo, and archaeologist André Prous studied and dated 11,400 years for the skull of Luzia.

== Bibliography ==
- Dewar, Elaine. Bones: Discovering the First Americans. New York: Carroll & Graf, 2004.
- Laming-Emperaire, Annette. La Signification de l'art rupestre paléolithique. Paris: Picard, 1962,
- Lavallée, Danièle. "Annette Laming-Emperaire." Journal de la société des Américanistes 65 (1978): 224–226.
- Weber, George. "Lagoa Santa sites (Minas Gerais, Brazil)"
