= Jack Hranicky =

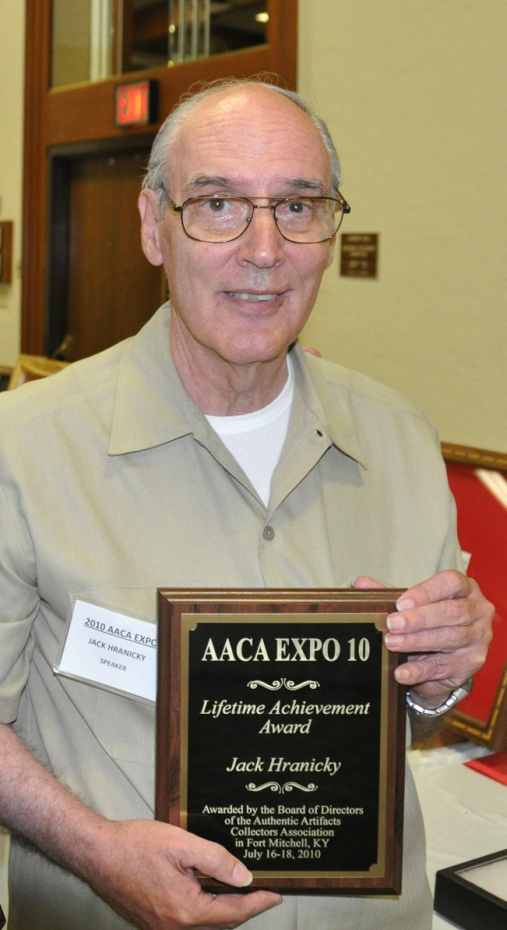
- Jack Hranicky RPA receiving Department of State award
- Occupation: Archaeologist

Jack Hranicky is a Registered Professional Archaeologist (RPA). During his forty-year career his scholarship has focused on the Paleo-Indian period and, in particular, stone tools and rock art. He has published more than 200 scholarly papers and 32 books, including a two-volume, 800-page survey of the material culture of Virginia. He was the webmaster of www.bipoints.com, which was a site on American early prehistory.

== Excavations ==
In 2011, Hranicky excavated the Spout Run site in Virginia, which he and the current landowners claim is a paleo-calendar, and announced it as the oldest, extant above-ground site in North America. However, the results of his work at the site have not yet been peer-reviewed and it remains to be seen whether the rocky areas are natural or cultural features, or if there are actually any Paleoindian artifacts present.

Among the growing list of features claimed for the 2-mile complex are a series of concentric rock rings and associated fire hearth, rock art including two sets of "hand prints", direct alignment with both solar solstices, alignment east-to-west with the seasonal equinoxes, a lunar focus, as well as the site’s major feature, a stone altar which also aligns with the summer solstice. No other known Paleoindian sites exist with any of these features, casting doubt on the age and validity of the site.

== Accomplishments ==
In addition to the Spout Run site, his major Virginia excavations are the Fout, Fisher, and Tanner sites. Hranicky has participated in close to 50 other excavations. He describes the early people who roamed the area approximately 12,000 years ago as “Virginia’s first Engineers."

Hranicky taught anthropology at the Northern Virginia Community College and St. Johns High School College. He has delivered hundreds of archaeological papers at various amateur and professional conferences throughout the United States. He operated the first bulletin board Archeological Society of Virginia Network (ASVnet) and Eastern States Archeological Federation Network (ESAFnet) and an Internet website in archaeology. He holds the Internet domain archeology.org, one of the first web addresses for archaeology. He performed close to 200 artifact collection appraisals, from Missouri to Florida to New York. Additionally, he mediated the turnover of the Maryland’s Sandy Hill Adena Cache to the Public Domain. Hranicky has served as president of the Archeological Society of Virginia (ASV) and served on its executive board for 30 years. He served as the President of Eastern States Archeological Federation (ESAF), been served as past chairman of the Alexandria Archaeology Commission, and he is a charter member of both the RPA and Council of Virginia Archeologist. He is a life member of the Archeological Society of Virginia and Archeological Society of Maryland, Inc. He runs the Virginia Rockart Survey and the McCary Fluted Point Survey. Hranicky did his undergraduate at the Virginia Commonwealth University and graduate studies at the University of Oklahoma. According to the registrar's offices at the Virginia Commonwealth University and the University of Oklahoma, he received a B.S. in sociology from the former in 1970, and attended the latter for one semester in 1983, studying communication but not receiving a degree.
