= Rimrock Draw Rockshelter =

Rock shelter in Oregon, United States

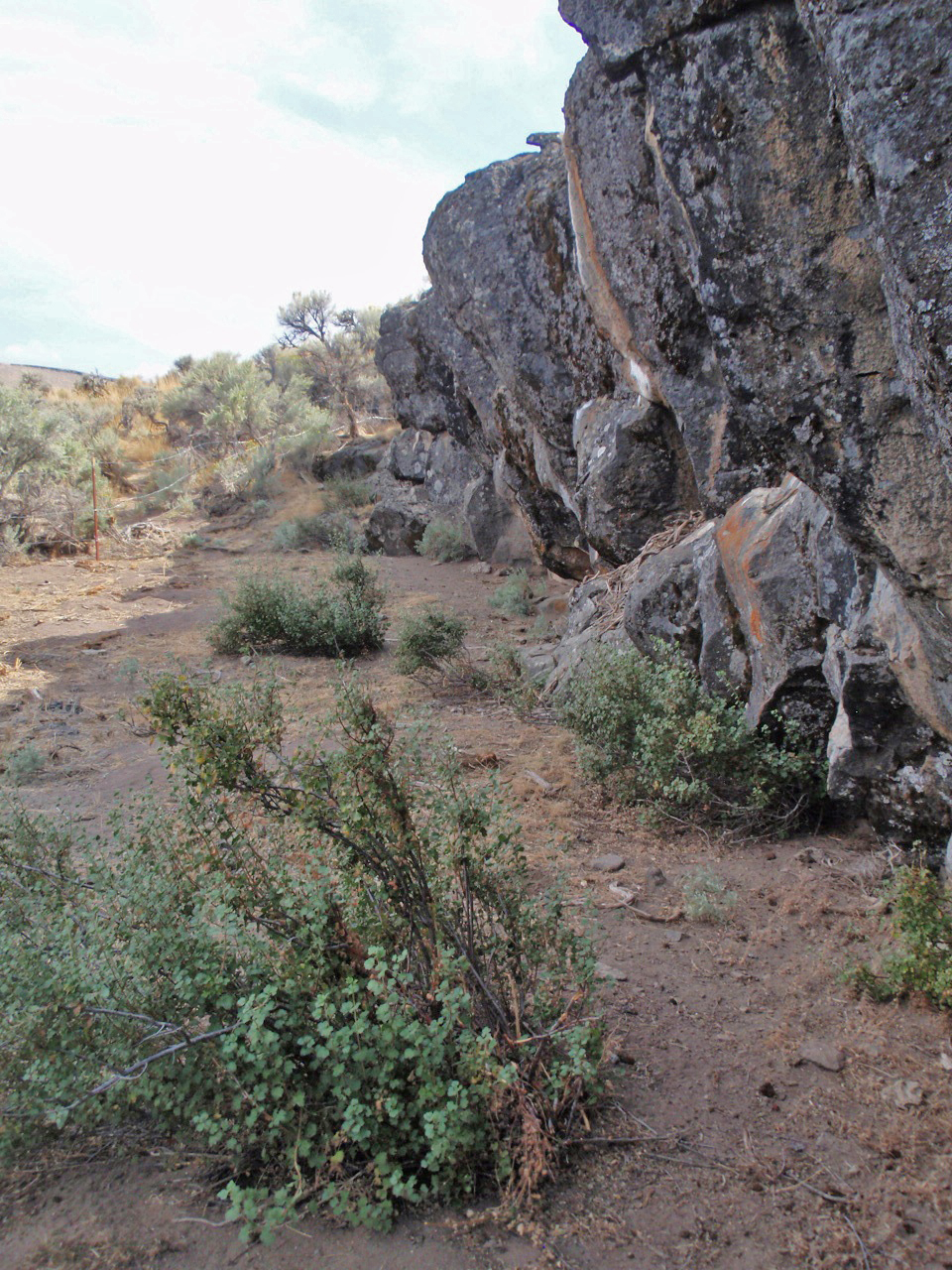
- Looking southeast along Rimrock Draw Rockshelter
- Interactive map of Rimrock Draw Rockshelter
- 43°29′29″N 119°47′54″W
- Type: Rockshelter
- Cultures: c. 18,250 Cal BP
- Location: Riley, Oregon
- Region: Oregon, United States

Site notes
- Archaeologists: Dr. Patrick O'Grady
- Owner: Bureau of Land Management

Rimrock Draw Rockshelter is a rockshelter located in Eastern Oregon, in the Pacific Northwest region of the United States. It is an archaeological site being studied by the University of Oregon under the guidance of Dr. Patrick O'Grady in coordination with the Museum of Natural and Cultural History and in partnership with the Bureau of Land Management (BLM).

It is notable for potentially being one of the oldest archaeological sites in North America. Unpublished dates ranging from ca. 18,000 Cal BP to 17,000 Cal BP were identified by Dr. Thomas Stafford Jr. and Dr. John Southon. The dated specimens were from camelid and bison teeth, respectively. The animal bones were found in association with obsidian debitage. According to a report by the BLM, stone tools and flakes were found below the stratigraphy of the dated animal teeth.

In 2012, excavation encountered Mount St. Helens Sg tephra (~15,600 cal yr BP) overlaying camelops tooth fragments. Ten centimeters below the teeth fragments an orange agate/chalcedony flake tool was collected. In 2017, further orange agate/chalcedony debitage was found along with bison carpal and teeth fragments, and obsidian flakes, all suggesting a pre-Clovis occupation.

== See also ==
- Connley Caves
- Cooper's Ferry site
- Fort Rock Cave
- Paisley Caves
