= Ruth DeEtte Simpson =

American archaeologist

Ruth DeEtte Simpson (May 6, 1918 – January 19, 2000) was an American archaeologist and founder of the Archaeological Survey Association of Southern California.

Born in Pasadena, California, Simpson received her master's degree from the University of Southern California in 1944 and went on to be the curator of the Heard Museum in Arizona for two years. She worked as a curator at the Southwest Museum in Los Angeles from 1946 to 1964 and then as a county archaeologist at the San Bernardino County Museum in Redlands. She mostly conducted fieldwork in the Mojave Desert, including with Louis Leakey on the Calico Early Man Site, though this led to disagreements between Louis and his wife Mary Leakey.

Simpson was a member of the American Anthropologist Association and the Society of American Archaeology.

== Selected publications ==
- Simpson, Ruth D. E. The Eastern Calico Mountains District: An Archaeological Survey in the Mojave Desert of Eastern San Bernardino County San Bernardino, CA: The Association, 1950.
- Simpson, Ruth D. E. Coyote Gulch: Archaeological Investigations of an Early Lithic Locality in the Mohave Desert of San Bernardino County. Los Angeles: Archaeological Survey Association of Southern California, 1961.
- Mark Raymond Harrington and Ruth DeEtte Simpson. Tule Springs Nevada with Other Evidence of Pleistocene Man in North America. Series Number 1. Highland Park, Los Angeles: Southwest Museum Papers, 1961.
- Smith, Gerald A, and Ruth D. E. Simpson. An Introduction to Basketry of the Contemporary Indians of San Bernardino County. Bloomington, Calif.: San Bernardino County Museum, 1964.
- Simpson, Ruth D. E. An Archaeological Survey of Troy Lake, San Bernardino County: A Preliminary Report. Bloomington, CA: San Bernardino County Museum Association, 1965.
- Simpson, Ruth D. E. The Hopi Indians. Los Angeles: Southwest Museum, 1971.
- Simpson, Ruth D. E. Rock Camp, San Bernardino Mountain Archaeological Excavation. Bloomington, Calif.: San Bernardino County Museum Association, 1972.
- Simpson, Ruth D. E. Rock Camp Site: Archaeological Excavation of an Indian Campsite Near Lake Arrowhead, San Bernardino Mountains. Bloomington, Calif: San Bernardino County Museum Association, 1972.
- Simpson, Ruth D. E. The Yermo Dump Site, San Bernardino County: An Archaeological Assessment and Mitigation Report. Redlands, CA: The county, 1981.
- Simpson, Ruth D. E, Leland W. Patterson, and Clay A. Singer. Early Lithic Technology of the Calico Site, Southern California. Yermo, Calif: Calico Archeological Site, 1981.
- Simpson, Ruth D. E, and George T. Jefferson. The Lake Manix Lithic Industry: An Archaeological Survey in the Eastern Calico Mountains District of the Mojave Desert, San Bernardino County, California. Redlands, CA: San Bernardino County Museum Association, 1998.
