= Calico Early Man Site =

Archaeological site in California, United States

- Calico Mountains Archeological District
- U.S. National Register of Historic Places
- U.S. Historic district

- Location within California Location within the United States
- Nearest city: Yermo, California
- Coordinates: 34.94814068°N 116.76133173°W
- Area: 100.5 acres (40.7 ha)
- NRHP reference No.: 73000430
- Added to NRHP: March 30, 1973

The Calico Early Man Site is a disputed archaeological site in a Pleistocene lake located in the central Mojave Desert near Barstow, California. In the 1960s, anthropologist Louis Leakey proposed that the site contained artifacts created by early man, which has not been accepted by most archaeologists. This site is on and in late middle-Pleistocene fanglomerates (now-cemented alluvial debris flow deposits) known variously as the Calico Hills, the Yermo Hills, or the Yermo formation. Holocene evidence includes petroglyphs and trail segments that are probably related to outcrops of local high-quality siliceous rock (primarily chalcedony in freshwater limestone).

== Introduction ==
The stone tools of these industries, along with preforms, lithic core, technical flakes, and pieces of angular debitage, mainly of chalcedony, are found on and in late middle Pleistocene-age fanglomerates and younger inset alluvial terraces in the Calico Hills (also known as the Yermo Hills) east of the Calico Peaks and the Calico Mountains. The location is in the central portion of southern California's Mojave Desert. Historically, this archaeological project has also been known as "The Calico Mountains Archaeological Site" and "The Calico Hills Archaeological Site". Today, it is called "The Calico Early Man Site".

=== Manix Basin ===
In most of the Great Basin region, Late Pleistocene and Holocene alluviation has effectively buried and sealed earlier Pleistocene sediments and possible evidence of pre-Clovis cultures. In the Manix Basin (Lower Mojave Valley) of San Bernardino County, California a fortuitous ensemble of environmental factors relating to mountain building, climatically controlled conditions for lake formation, alluviation, and erosion, faulting and folding and significant erosion of ancient lacustrine plain sediments by the modern drainage have rendered relatively accessible for archaeological investigation a series of deposits that represent more than 350,000 years of Quaternary history.

The Manix Basin, a structural basin in the central Mojave Desert, is the third and lowest major valley of the Mojave River, presently an exotic stream with episodic flow, which has its source in the San Bernardino Mountains, some 200 km (120 mi) to the southeast.

A freshwater lake developed in the basin about 400,000 – 500,000 years ago near the Calico Archaeological Site. The lake was present until the late Pleistocene. The last high stand of Lake Manix was at 543 m (1,781 ft) and had a surface area of approximately 236 km^{2} (91 sq mi). This lake drained, probably catastrophically, approximately 18,100 years ago, probably as a result of a major increase in river inflow or tectonic movement on the Manix fault.

== Fossils ==
The lacustrine, fluvial, and alluvial sediments of the Pleistocene Manix Formation contain remains of numerous Rancholabrean animals ranging in age from approximately 20,000 years to well in excess of 350,000 years before present. Fossils recovered from the section include: camel, horse, mammoth, saber-tooth cat, dire wolf, short-faced bear, coyote, flamingo, pelican, eagle, swan, geese, mallard duck, ruddy duck, canvas backed duck, double-crested cormorant, grebe, crane, seagull and stork.

== Prehistoric tools ==
Thousands of rocks that bear a strong resemblance to prehistoric tools have been found at the site, both on the surface, and up to 8 m (26 ft) below the surface. A stone from the Master Pit had been dated to over 200,000 BP. This date could have been the result of contamination from other elements in the soil, so currently there is an effort to date verified lithics through thermoluminescence dating. While the results are still pending, the styles suggest 20,000 to 30,000 BP.

The debate centers on whether the "tools" were made by humans (i.e., artifacts), or through typical geological processes (i.e. geofacts). The general scientific consensus is that the subsurface items are geofacts.

== Artifacts or geofacts? ==
The artifactual character of the Calico lithic assemblage has been questioned (Haynes 1973; Payen 1982a, 1982b; Taylor and Payen 1979; Duvall and Venner 1979). Haynes (1973) postulated that rock fracturing by tectonic stresses, weather, rock-on-rock percussion in streams and mudflows, pressure retouch of buried cobbles, and successive generations of flake removal and separation from cores through cycles of erosion and redeposition could have occurred during deposition of the alluvial deposits at Calico and produced specimens indistinguishable from artifacts.

Specimens collected from earlier excavations up to the present are under analysis by archaeologists volunteering at the Calico site. Many have been confirmed to be geofacts, but some are believed to be potential artifacts and have been cataloged and submitted for thermoluminescent dating. Currently work is being done on compiling and publishing the most recent finds at the site to be submitted to the local tribes, community and journals for peer review.

=== Flake scar angles ===
Payen (1982) studied flake scar angles as traits for distinguishing artifacts from geofacts. He tested a method developed by Barnes (1939) who had compared frequency of obtuse angles on eoliths, natural fractures, and artifacts. Barnes found obtuse angles on 72% of eoliths, 75% of natural fractures, and 18% of artifacts and concluded that “The flaked tools of an industry…may be considered to be of human origin if not more than 25% of the angles scar-platform are obtuse (90° and over)” (Barnes 1939:111). Payen measured all flake angles on each Calico specimen in his sample. It is conceivable that flake scars were confused for striking platforms. Flaking from one side of a specimen can often remove earlier platform areas on the other side. Angles between two flake scars are different from angles between platforms and derivative flake scars.

Payen compared mean angle values for Calico specimens with those on specimens selected as representing controlled and uncontrolled fracture. He found that “Statistically, there is no significant difference between the sample of alleged tools and the uncontrolled fracture series.” (Payen 1982:200).

Duvall and Venner (1979:462) examined a sample of Calico artifacts and concluded they were form-selected examples of naturally flaked rocks. Their assessment was based on variances in seven attributes (length, width, thickness, flake angle, medial axis angle, lateral edge angle, and distal edge angle) and comparison with comparable attributes on specimens in eight Paleoindian collections reported by Wilmsen (1970).

=== Current consensus ===
Both the Duvall/Venner and the Payen papers have been criticized on a number of levels, and analyses supporting the pro-artifact argument have been published. The present consensus is that there is no evidence of human activity at the Calico Early Man site. This consensus developed based on a number of factors, including:

- The lack of other evidence of human activity (e.g. human or animal remains, or non-tool artifacts).
- The deep antiquity of the site (the next oldest date for human artifacts in the Americas is 30,000 BP, and that date itself is controversial).
- The sheer number of possible tools, up to 60,000 by one account.
- The research by Duvall/Venner, Payen, and others providing possible natural explanations for the stone objects.

== History of excavations ==
Memorial plaque to Ruth DeEtte Simpson at the site

In 1959 Louis Leakey, while at the British Museum of Natural History in London, received a visit from Ruth DeEtte Simpson, an archaeologist from California. Simpson had acquired what looked like ancient scrapers from a site in the Calico Hills and showed it to Leakey.

Leakey viewed it as important to study the Calico Hills site, as he was convinced that the number and distribution of native languages in the Americas required more time than 12,000 years to evolve and acquire their current distribution. In 1963, Leakey obtained funds from the National Geographic Society and commenced archaeological excavations with Simpson. Excavations in an area stratigraphically separate from a verified 10,000-year-old Paleoindian site were carried out by Leakey and Simpson, who believed that they had located stone artifacts that were dated 100,000 years or older, suggesting a human presence in North America much earlier than estimated.

The archaeologist Jeffrey Goodman who worked at the site with Leakey had also claimed the stone artifacts to be human made. Goodman has also made controversial statements that the artifacts found at Calico Hills may be as old as 500,000 years and if proven would be the oldest human artifacts in the world, which would place human origins in the Americas. However, the majority of scientists have rejected these claims. According to Kenneth Feder, "Goodman's claims were not backed up with even a shred of evidence."

The geologist Vance Haynes had made three visits to the site in 1973 and had claimed that the artifacts of Leakey were naturally formed geofacts. According to Haynes, the geofacts were formed by stones becoming fractured in an ancient river on the site.

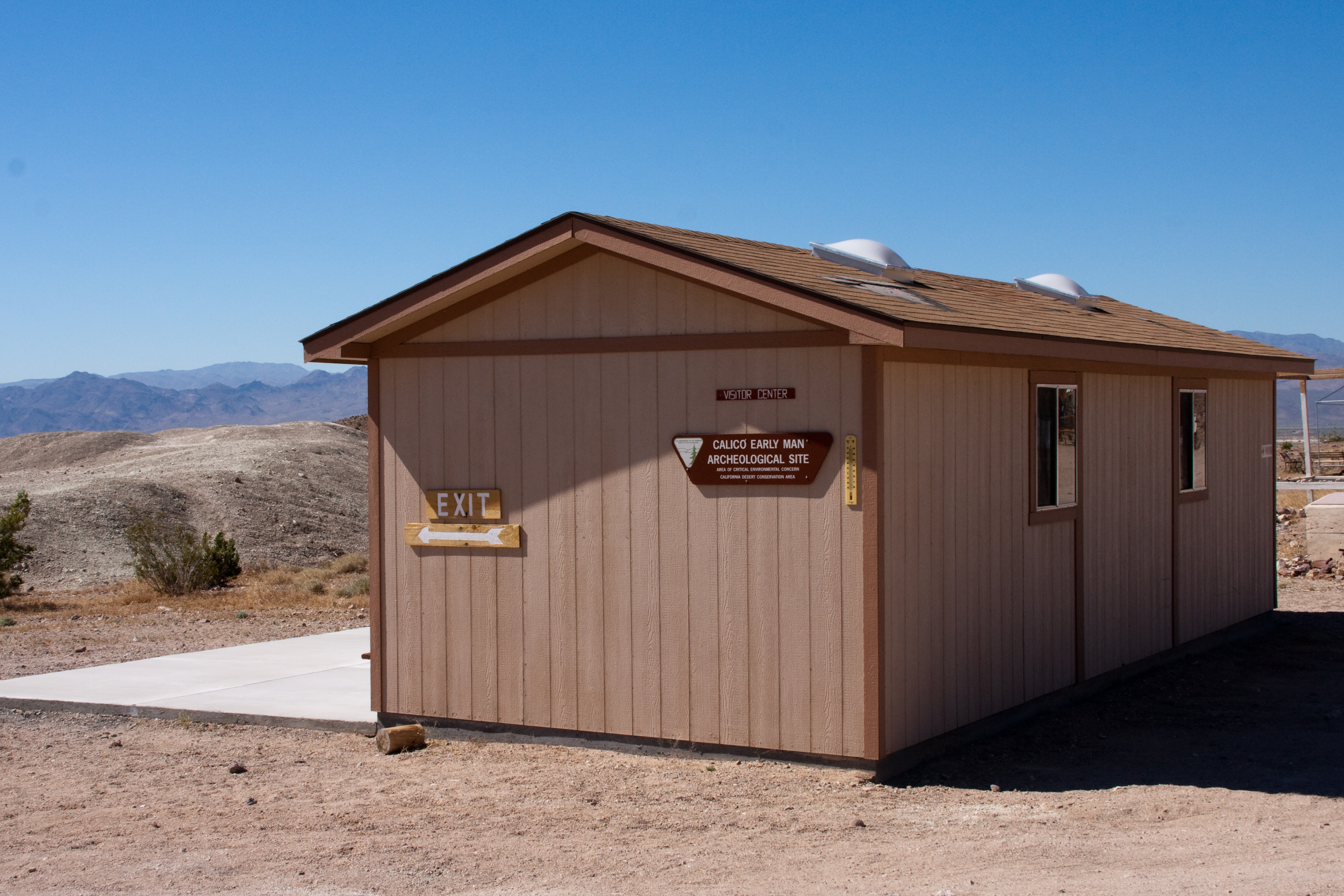
Visitor center

In her autobiography, Louis' wife Mary Leakey wrote that because of his involvement with the Calico Hills site she had lost academic respect for him, and that the Calico excavations was "catastrophic to his professional career and was largely responsible for the parting of our ways". She did not share his visionary views about the Calico site. She regarded Louis as often slipping into incompetence and often publicized that opinion. Louis Leakey continued to visit the site several times a year and was connected with the project until his death in 1972. The site was taken over by the Bureau of Land Management and was opened to the public.

== See also ==
- Archaeology of the Americas
- Arlington Springs Man - (Human remains)
- Buhl woman - (Human remains)
- Calico Ghost Town
- Cerutti Mastodon site
- Cueva de las Manos - (Cave paintings)
- Fort Rock Cave - (Archeological site)
- Kennewick Man - (Human remains)
- Kwäday Dän Ts’ìnchi - (Human remains)
- Marmes Rockshelter - (Archeological site)
- Paisley Caves - (Archeological site)

== Sources and further reading ==
- Bischoff, J.L., R.J. Shlemon, T.L. Ku, R.D. Simpson, R.J. Rosenbauer, & F.E. Budinger Jr., "1981 Uranium-series and Soils-geomorphic Dating of the Calico Archaeological Site, California", Geology V9 (12), pp. 576–582.
- Budinger Jr., Fred E., Oberlander, Theodore Calicodig.org "This web site describes and analyzes the Calico Archaeological Site and the Calico Lithic Industry". With many stone object photos.
- Debenham, N., (1998) Thermoluminescence Dating of Sediment from the Calico Site (California) (CAL1), Quaternary TL Surveys, Nottingham, United Kingdom, 1998.
- Duvall, James G., and Venner, William Thomas, “A Statistical Analysis of the Lithics from the Calico Site (SBCM 1500A), California”, Journal of Field Archaeology, Winter 1979: Vol. 6, No. 4, pp. 455–462.
- Haynes, Vance (1973) "The Calico Site: Artifacts or Geofacts?", Science, vol. 181, no. 4097, July 27, 1973, pp. 305–310.
- Morell, Virginia (1995) Ancestral Passions: The Leakey Family and the Quest for Humankind's Beginnings, Simon & Schuster, pp. 266–267.
- Payen, L., “Artifacts or geofacts at Calico: Application of the Barnes test,” in Peopling of the New World, Ericson J., Taylor, R., and Berger, R., eds. Los Altos, California: Ballena Press, 1982, pp. 193–201.
- Patterson, Leland W.; Hoffman, Louis V.; Higginbotham, Rose Marie; Simpson, Ruth D. (1987) "Analysis of Lithic Flakes at the Calico Site, California", in Journal of Field Archaeology, Vol. 14, No. 1 (Spring, 1987), pp. 91–106.
- AmericanWest's North American Archaeology Section, Calico Site Update. ". . .over 60,000 tools and flakes have been collected".
- Friends of Calico Early Man Site; 2024 Orange Tree Lane, Redlands, CA 93474. (accessed 6/2010)
- Calico Mountains Archaeological Site. (2015). " "...Current Consensus.
