= Marmes Rockshelter =

Archaeological site in Washington, USA

Coordinates: 46.61431°N 118.20242°W

- U.S. National Register of Historic Places
- U.S. National Historic Landmark
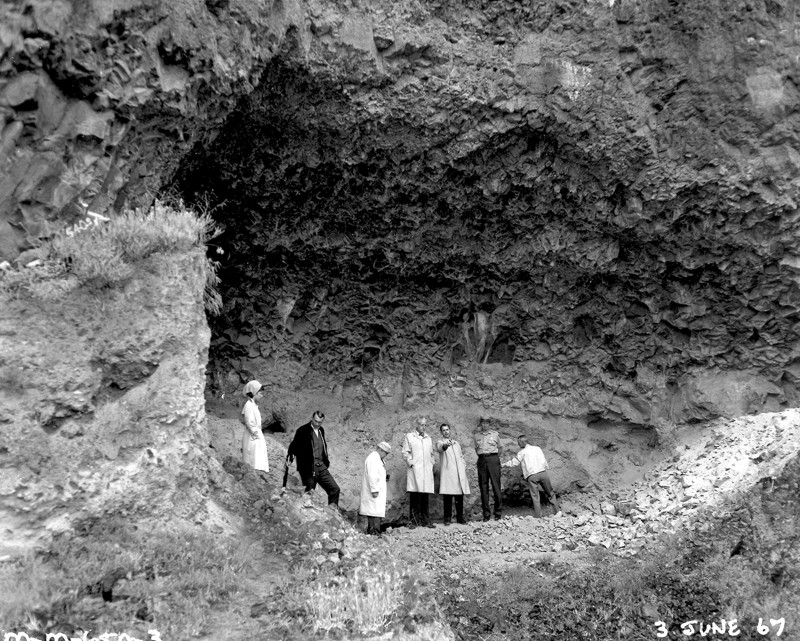
- Unknown officials in the Marmes Rock Shelter before it was submerged

- Location within Washington (state) Location within the United States
- Location: Franklin County, Washington, U.S.
- NRHP reference No.: 66000745

Significant dates
- Added to NRHP: October 15, 1966
- Designated NHL: July 19, 1964

The Marmes Rockshelter (also known as (45-FR-50)) is an archaeological site first excavated in 1962, near Lyons Ferry Park and the confluence of the Snake and Palouse Rivers, in Franklin County, southeastern Washington. This rockshelter is remarkable in the level of preservation of organic materials, the depth of stratified deposits, and the apparent age of the associated Native American human remains. The site was discovered on the property of Roland Marmes, and was the site of the oldest human remains in North America at that time. In 1966, the site became, along with Chinook Point and the American and English Camps on San Juan Island, the first National Historic Landmarks listed in Washington. In 1969, the site was submerged in water when a levee protecting it from waters rising behind the then newly constructed Lower Monumental Dam, which was 20 miles (32 km) down the Snake River, failed to hold back water that leaked into the protected area through gravel under the soil, creating Lake Herbert G. West.

== The excavation ==
The existence of the site was first brought to the attention of Professor Richard Daugherty in 1952 by a rancher named John McGregor. Excavations at the site were started by Daugherty and Roald Fryxell, a geologist, under the auspices of Washington State University (WSU) and the National Park Service in 1962, and continued until 1964. In 1965, Fryxell returned to the site along with Professor Carl Gustafson and students from WSU, and had Roland Marmes dig a trench in front of the rockshelter with his bulldozer, which turned up human and elk bones. Radiocarbon dating indicated that the human remains were about 10,000 years old. In 1968, Fryxell returned, this time with several WSU professors (including a visiting professor from Poland) and members of the United States Geological Survey, and found more human and animal remains, along with bone tools. April 29 of that year, Washington Senator Warren Magnuson made a public announcement of the finds.

== Inundation of the site ==
After a bill that would have provided funds to protect the site failed, then-President Lyndon B. Johnson signed an Executive Order that authorized funding for the Army Corps of Engineers to build a levee around the site to protect it from the imminent flooding caused by construction of the Lower Monumental Dam. Late that year, Daugherty left the dig, leaving Fryxell to lead the project. Within three days of the closure of the Lower Monumental Dam in February 1969, the site was completely underwater, due to the seepage of water through thick layers of gravel that had not been accounted for. However, as the site was being flooded, the excavation team laid down plastic sheeting topped with gravel in the hopes of being able to return to the dig in the future.

The location of the site is still known today, and has come under some threat of erosion from the wakes of motorized vehicles on the lake. The Army Corps of Engineers considers the site to be in stable condition with a "Satisfactory" threat rating since 2004.

== Findings at the site ==
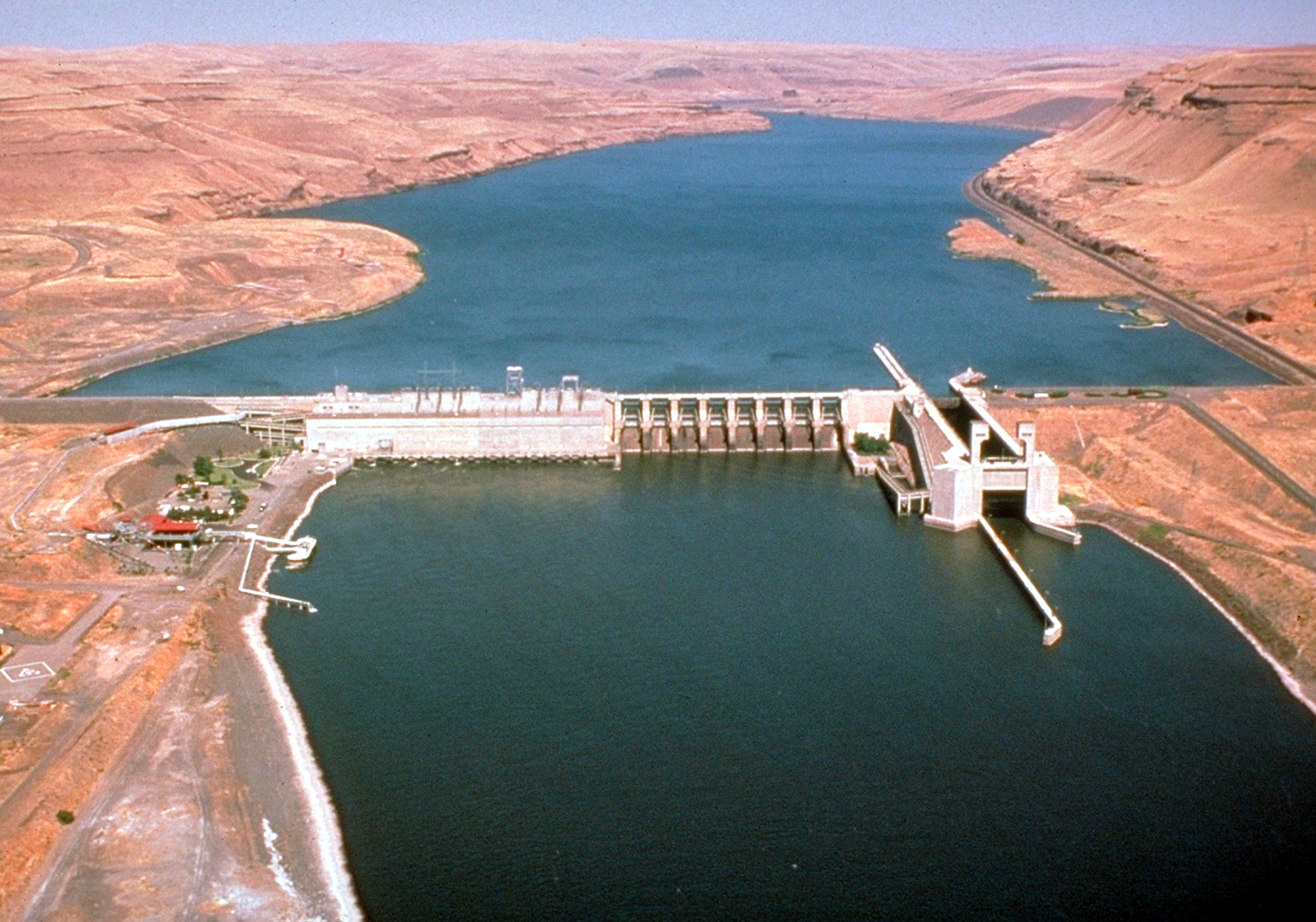
The creation of the Lower Monumental Dam raised the level of the Palouse River high enough to submerge the Marmes site completely under water.

The excavations at the site revealed evidence of human occupation from a period that lasted 8,000 years, and that the area was home to humans as long ago as 11,230 years ago. The people living at the site hunted game such as elk and deer using atlatls, and also hunted smaller mammals such as beavers, while they gathered mussels from the river. The excavation turned up graves, which included beads carved from shells and spear points. One grave, that of a child, held five matching knives made of stone. The excavation also turned up chalcedony and chert projectile points. Those in the upper layers were made of agate, which is not found in the area. Stone tools were found as well, such as scrapers for use in tanning hides, and mortars and pestles. In layers dated to 7,000 years ago, a large number of shells belonging to a snail of the genus Olivella were found, which would have been imported from the West Coast of the United States, 200 miles (322 km) away. The majority of the shells had holes drilled through them, indicating that they had adorned necklaces.

In addition, one of the five known Jefferson Peace Medals was found associated with the most recent human remains at the site, evidently having been given to a local Native American leader (presumably of the Nez Perce) during the Lewis and Clark Expedition. This medal has since been returned to the Nez Perce and reburied, as per Native American Graves Protection and Repatriation Act regulations.

Analyzing the pollen sequences at the site showed a steppe ecosystem immediately following the retreat of glaciers 13,000 years ago, which gave way to a mixed forest of pine and spruce, which led into the current sagebrush prairie ecosystem.

== Implications of the findings ==
Unlike many archaeological finds, the human remains at the site were able to be dated with environmental, geological, and archaeological methods. Human remains at the site are the oldest that have been found in Washington, and at the time were the oldest set of remains found in North America. Later radiocarbon work has confirmed the original dating of this site, indicating that these human remains, albeit very fragmentary, are still some of the oldest ever excavated in the New World. This finding was useful in confirming the early chronology of the region and confirming the antiquity of the styles of associated bone tools.

== See also ==
- Archaeology of the Americas
- Arlington Springs Man
- Calico Early Man Site
- Cueva de las Manos
- Buhl woman
- Fort Rock Cave
- Kennewick Man
- Kwäday Dän Ts’ìnchi
- List of National Historic Landmarks in Washington (state)
- Paisley Caves

== Sources ==
- Downey, Roger (2000), Riddle of the Bones: Politics, Science, Race, and the Story of Kennewick Man, Springer, ISBN 0-387-98877-7
- Fiedel, Stuart J (1992), Prehistory of the Americas, Cambridge University Press, ISBN 0-521-42544-1
- Hicks, Brent A (2004), Marmes Rockshelter: A Final Report on 11,000 Years of Cultural Use, Pullman, Washington: Washington State University Press, ISBN 0-87422-275-3
- Kirk, Ruth (1970), The Oldest Man in America: An Adventure in Archaeology, New York: Harcourt Brace Jovanovich Inc, ISBN 0-15-257831-5
- Kirk, Ruth (1978), Exploring Washington Archaeology, University of Washington Press, ISBN 0-295-95630-5
- LeWarne, Charles (2003), Washington State, Seattle: University of Washington Press, ISBN 0-295-97301-3
