= Leanderthal Lady =

10,000 to 13,000 year old skeleton found in Texas, USA

Leanderthal Lady is the skeletal remains of a prehistoric woman discovered in January 1983 near the city of Leander, Texas. The remains were alternatively labeled "Leanne". Both names were inspired by the proximity of the site to the town of Leander, a suburb of Austin. Contrary to her name, the Leanderthal Lady lived during the end of the Ice Age, long after the Neanderthals.

Leanne was discovered by the Texas Department of Transportation at the Wilson-Leonard Brushy Creek Site (an ancient Native American campsite) during the construction of the highway RM 1431. Scientists described the location as "one of the oldest intact human burial sites discovered in the United States." The land, once donated to the Archaeological Conservancy, was returned to its previous owners after a lengthy legal battle. Leanne's remains and artifacts from the site are kept at the Texas Archeological Research Laboratory in Austin.

== Analysis ==
Carbon dating and stratigraphic analysis showed the remains to be 10,000 to 13,000 years old. The skeleton is of a 5-foot-3-inch (1.60 m) tall female who was about 18 to 30 years old at the time of death. The find was significant as one of the oldest and most complete human skeletons found in North America.

== See also ==
- Minnesota Woman

30°29′37.51″N 97°51′12.73″W
