= Fort Rock Cave =

Archaeological site in Oregon, USA

- U.S. National Register of Historic Places
- U.S. National Historic Landmark
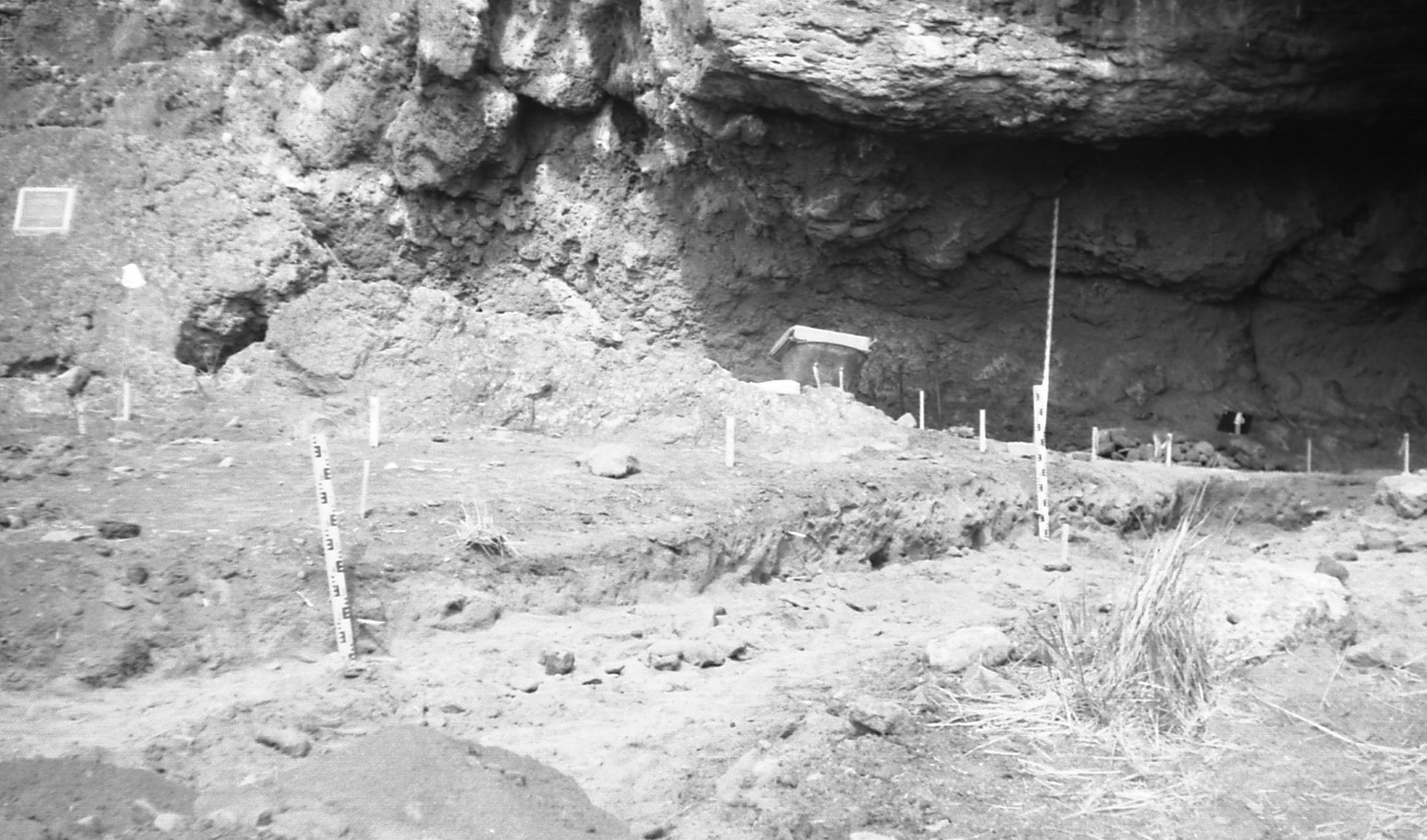
- University of Oregon archaeological excavations at Fort Rock Cave, 1966
- Location: Address restricted
- Nearest city: Fort Rock, Oregon
- NRHP reference No.: 66000641

Significant dates
- Added to NRHP: October 15, 1966
- Designated NHL: January 20, 1961

Fort Rock Cave was the site of the earliest evidence of human habitation in the US state of Oregon before the excavation of the Paisley Caves. Fort Rock Cave featured numerous well-preserved sagebrush sandals, ranging from 9,000 to 13,000 years old. The cave is located approximately 1.5 miles (2.4 km) west of Fort Rock near Fort Rock State Natural Area in Lake County. Fort Rock Cave was declared a National Historic Landmark in 1961, and added to the National Register of Historic Places in 1966.

The cave was found on Reub Long's ranch. It was formerly known as Menkenmaier Cave and Cow Cave.

== Description ==
Fort Rock Cave sits in the Fort Rock formation, and shares geological similarities to its surroundings, with presence of Hayes Butte basalt, and exposed Pliocene-era lava. Additionally, there is pumice and ash from Mount Mazama (deposited by the explosion forming Crater Lake about 7600 years ago). The opening of the cave is approximately 70 feet across, with a depth of near 60 feet, making it the largest cave in the Fort Rock area. Oriented facing the southeast, the combination of depth and position protect it from winds and summer heat. Archaeological excavators identified four strata of material in the cave: a bottom gravel layer, a silty brown layer, pumice and ash from Mt. Mazama, topped by a light tan sandy layer. Parts of the cave are collapsed, leaving some large boulders, which were involved in the excavations.

== Excavations ==
Excavations of the site began in 1938 led by Luther Cressman and his team of University of Oregon, and continued into the next year. At this time, Cressman unearthed a number of sandals, with damage and charring, and used a chemical preservative to prevent further decay, not knowing at the time that this would prevent radiocarbon dating of these artifacts. Cressman returned as an overseer to Stephen Bedwell in 1966 and 1967, to continue excavating the site. Upon their return, they found that the cave had been looted and vandalized, compromising the integrity of much of the area. However, a few areas under large fallen boulders were protected from disturbance, and were excavated at this time. Both periods of excavation provided limited documentation in comparison to modern archaeological data practices, causing issues for further archaeological study of the artifacts removed. Additionally, use of backhoes and dynamite at the site during the excavations in the 60s caused much destruction to the site. Some artifacts recovered during this second period of excavation were able to be dated by the Gakushuin Laboratory, generating further questioning of the integrity of the study, as this lab has generated erroneous data.

== Archaeology ==
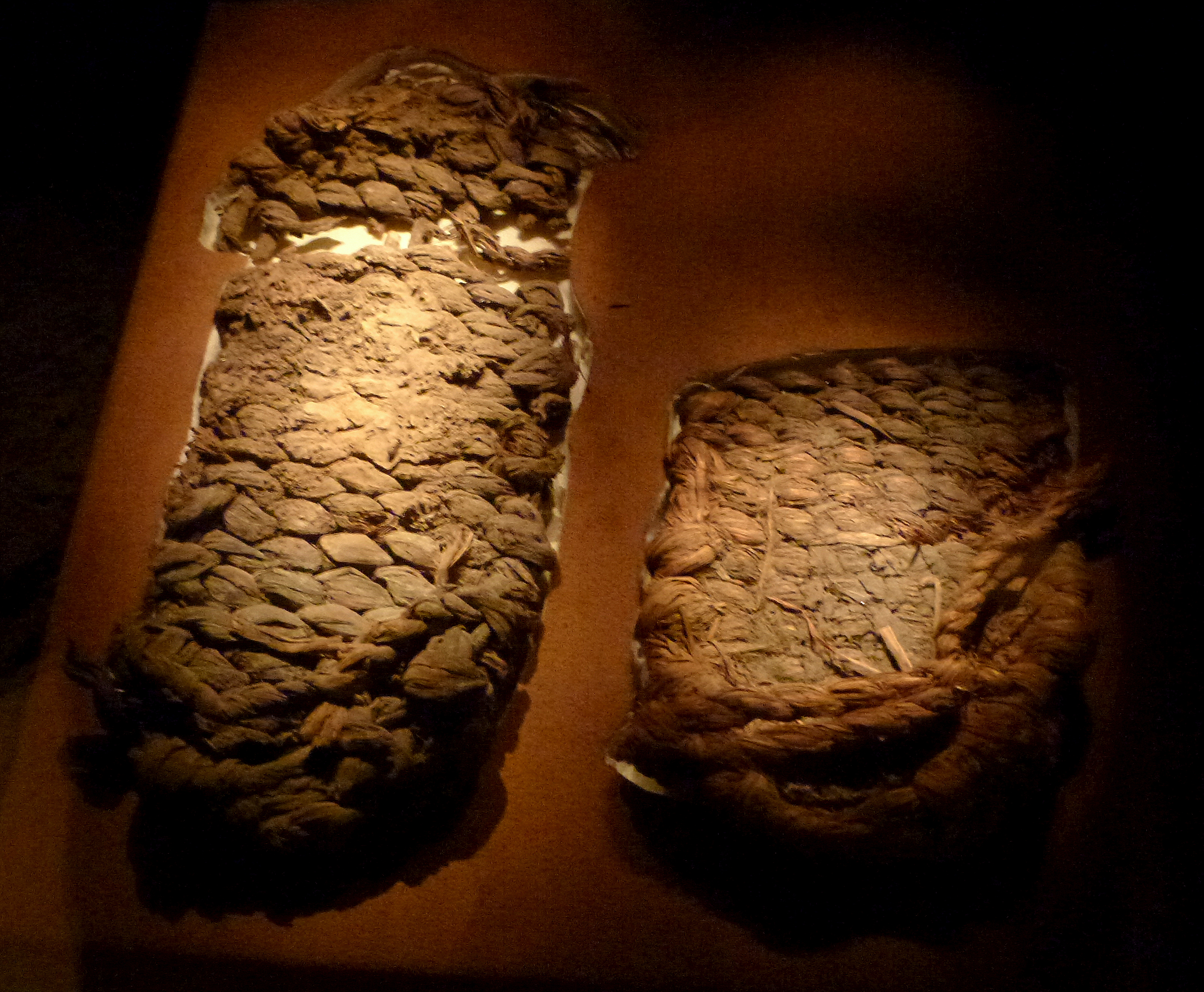
Fort Rock sandals on display at the Oregon Historical Society

Anthropologist Luther Cressman and his team recovered a significant collection of artifacts from under the Mazama Ash, dating those artifacts to more than 7,000 years ago. This collection included wooden artifacts, stone tools, shell beads, obsidian, basket fragments, and, most famously, 95 sandals woven from sagebrush bark (some of these sandals are now displayed at the University of Oregon Museum of Natural and Cultural History and in the town of Fort Rock). While the dry climate helped preserve these ancient sandals, exposure to the ash caused most of them to be charred, leading to Cressman's decision to chemically preserve them. This sandal style is known as Fort Rock style, since they were first discovered there, and is distinct from other variants; they are flat, closed toed and have a twined sole. They have been found at other sites, such as Cougar Mountain and Catlow Caves, as well. A local Fort Rock resident was responsible for finding a fragment of woven material which was eligible for dating, placing it around 9000 years ago. Some of these woven artifacts had diagonal twining and false embroidery decorative techniques, suggesting that these techniques were present in the region at that time. Additional artifacts found after the initial excavations included projectile points, obsidian and stone tools, and faunal remains, as well as more sandals. Calibrated radiocarbon dates from this set of artifacts estimated dates in the early Holocene period, approximately 10,000 years ago. The oldest dating from this site comes from a piece of charcoal dated to 13,000 BP, a date that has been debated by some archaeologists.

Lithic artefacts from the cave are classified as part of the Western Stemmed Tradition, which was widespread across the Intermountain West during the latest Pleistocene-early Holocene.

== See also ==
- Kennewick Man, skeletal remains discovered in the Pasco Basin
- Marmes Rockshelter, on the lower Snake River
- Paisley Caves, also in eastern Oregon, the site of perhaps the oldest human remains in the Americas
- Rimrock Draw Rockshelter, eastern Oregon archaeological site and potentially one of the oldest sites in North America
