= Paisley Caves =

Archaeological site in Oregon, USA

- Paisley Five Mile Point Caves
- U.S. National Register of Historic Places
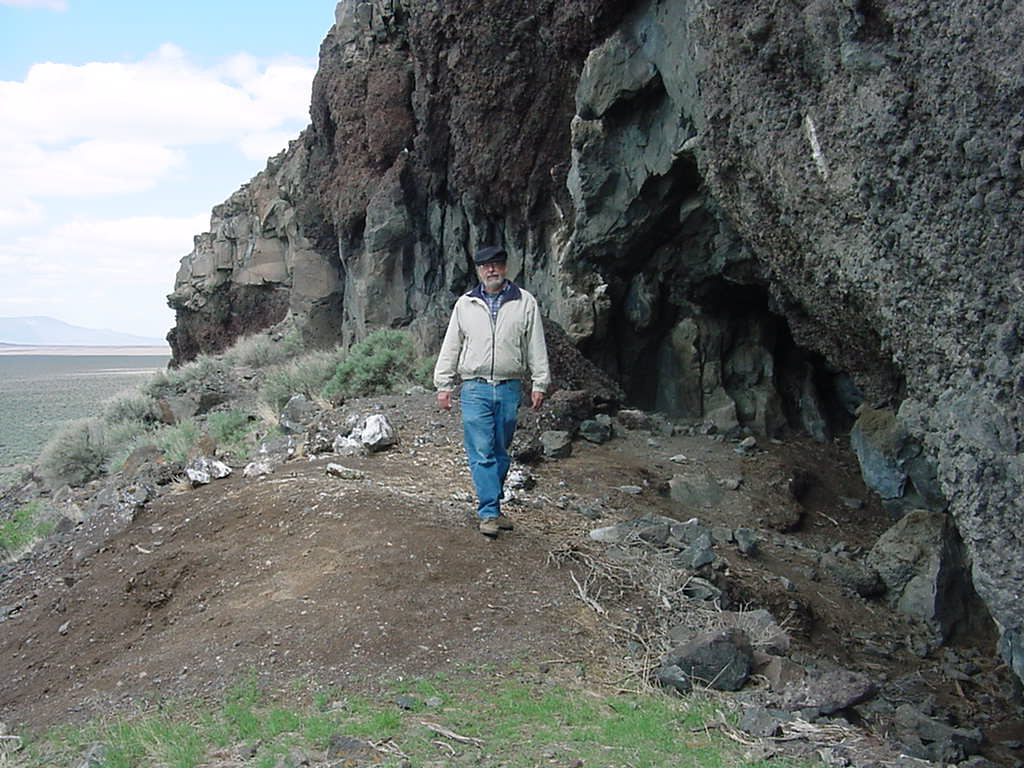
- A Bureau of Land Management archaeologist walks near Cave No. 5
- Location: Address restricted
- Nearest city: Paisley, Oregon, U.S.
- Coordinates: 42.7613°N 120.5514°W
- Built: ca. 14,300 BP
- NRHP reference No.: 14000708
- Added to NRHP: September 24, 2014

The Paisley Caves or the Paisley Five Mile Point Caves complex is a system of eight caves in an arid, desolate region of south-central Oregon, United States north of the present-day city of Paisley, Oregon. The caves are located in the Summer Lake basin at 4,520 feet (1,380 m) elevation and face west, carved into a ridge of Miocene and Pliocene era basalts mixed with soft volcanic tuffs and breccias by Pleistocene-era waves from Summer Lake. One of the caves may contain archaeological evidence of the oldest definitively-dated human presence in North America. The site was first studied by Luther Cressman in the 1930s.

Scientific excavations and analysis in the Paisley Caves since 2002 have uncovered substantial new discoveries, including subfossil human coprolites with the oldest DNA evidence of human habitation in North America, various artifacts, and animal remains. The DNA was radiocarbon dated to 14,300 BP or roughly 12,000 BC. The caves were added to the National Register of Historic Places in 2014.

== Significant findings ==
In the summer of 2007, a field school from the University of Oregon identified the oldest human DNA yet discovered in the Americas. This assertion is based on analysis of several coprolite samples found in the Paisley Caves complex. In total, workers have obtained over 280 radiocarbon dates and DNA analysis from more than 60 coprolites from the Paisley Caves. Coprolite analysis at varying ages revealed that these occupants were omnivorous, eating a combination of foraged plants, seeds, small mammals such as rodents, fish, and insects like beetles. Knowledge of this omnivorous mode of sustenance supports the notion that the coprolites are human in origin. Other authors have questioned the authenticity and relevance of the evidence gathered from ancient DNA and stratigraphy and challenge the morphological assignment of the coprolites to humans. Similarly, it is uncertain if damage to pre-Clovis animal bones at the site was the result of human butchering or animal trampling.

The coprolites were found in the same level as a small rock-lined hearth some 7 feet (2 m) below the modern surface. Also discovered at that level was a large number of bones from waterfowl, fish, and large mammals, including extinct camels, horses, and bison. Radiocarbon dating dates these coprolites to 14,400 years ago, probably representing a pre-Clovis occupation. DNA analysis provides apparent genetic ties to Siberia or Asia, rather than a distinct wave of migration.

Clovis ancestors, previously thought to be the first humans to live in the Americas, are currently thought to have crossed the Bering Strait into North America 12,000 cal yr BP. However, the Paisley Caves and other archaeological sites throughout the Americas, such as Monte Verde, have been dated to earlier than Clovis technologies. Scientific debate has shifted in recent years to question this long-held "Clovis first" hypothesis.

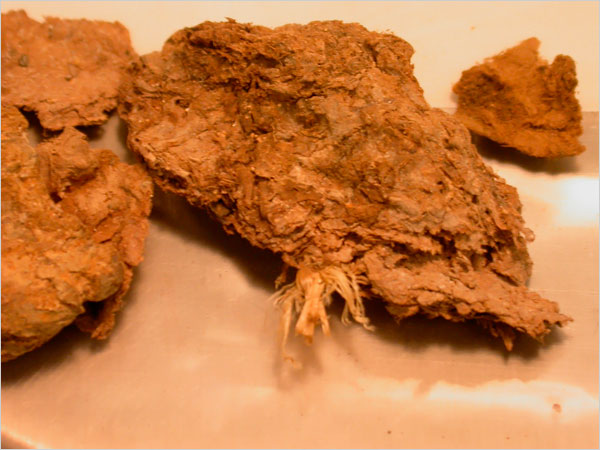
A coprolite from the Paisley Caves, Oregon, sampled in 2008 by Dr. Dennis LeRoy Jenkins with Oregon State University. Thought to be of human origin, but the morphology is inconsistent and sampled DNA may have been mobilized by fluids. Dated to 12,265 radiocarbon years

Evidence at other archaeological sites—as well as previous work at Paisley Caves in the 1930s—had been thought to provide such evidence, but questionable excavation techniques clouded the issue. Knowing this, the University of Oregon team worked carefully to avoid the mistakes of the past. The theory that pre-Clovis immigrants traveled to North America down the Pacific Coast suggests that the travelers would have passed through the hinterlands of what is Oregon today. DNA from coyote, fox, and dog (or wolf) was found as well.

== Coprolite controversy ==
Recent research has called the accuracy of radiocarbon dates from these coprolites into question on the basis of morphology and possible leaching contamination by exogenous human DNA. Sampled coprolites from lower lithostratigraphic units contained canid DNA in addition to human DNA. Other inter-mixed coprolites contained no human DNA, instead being fully attributed to late Pleistocene camelids and lions, and dated to 12,265 radiocarbon years. Some soil samples adjacent to the coprolites were also found to have human DNA, giving further credit to the leaching hypothesis.

Although any results from DNA have been reduced to ambiguous, other data from the coprolites coincidentally provide evidence of pre-Clovis occupation. Coprolites also contain a mixture of lipids and other organic compounds from digestion—called fecal biomarkers. Such lipids are chemically stable and hydrophobic, protecting them from water-induced mobility and serving as more reliable data from buried coprolites than DNA. Additionally, a human-made bulrush shaft was found above a coprolite and dated to 12,270 yr BP—further verifying the pre-Clovis occupation. These data provide evidence that the associated Western Stemmed Tradition points are the oldest lithic technology in the Americas and outdate Clovis points.

== Western Stemmed Tradition at the Paisley Caves ==
Artifacts found in the Paisley Caves alongside coprolites bear no resemblance to traditional Clovis points, and instead belong to a group of occupants now referred to as Western Stemmed Tradition. The Western Stemmed Tradition occupies similar tool groupings as Clovis technology—projectile points, most notably—and shares morphology and technology with Afro-Eurasian forms. It was originally thought to have developed after Clovis technology, but discovery at the Paisley Caves suggests they were at the very least contemporaneous. Dating via fecal biomarkers further supports this notion. Additionally, the Western Stemmed Tradition projectile points from Paisley Caves were preserved significantly better than anywhere else in the western United States, allowing for the development of diagnostic elements.

Western Stemmed Tradition points are morphologically distinct from Clovis points, with narrow bifaces, shoulders, and thicker, convex bases instead of the longer prismatic blades of Clovis points. There are also procedural differences in how these points were flaked. Evidence of repeated sharpening along Western Stemmed Tradition points suggests they may have also been used as knives for skinning and cutting.

== See also ==
- Fort Rock Cave
- Lake Abert
- Picture Rock Pass Petroglyphs
- Rimrock Draw Rockshelter
- National Register of Historic Places listings in Lake County, Oregon

== External ==
- Laser Scanning History: Paisley Caves
