= Long (Western surname) =

Long is a surname, with people coming to have the surname through various origins.

The Longs in Ireland got their names from a number of origins. Some are of English, Scottish and Norman descent. The Norman de Long and le Lung arrived in the 11th century with the Anglo-Norman conquest in 1066 AD and established in numerous locations. A number of Irish Gaelic septs of O'Longain and O'Longaig contributed to the origin of the name. One sept was located in County Armagh, but the greater numbers were in County Cork at Cannovee and also at Moviddy. The Longs lost all their lands in the upheavals of the 17th century. The name is found in its greatest numbers in Munster, County Cork being most favored. The line of direct descent from the last elected chieftain to the present day is unbroken — the official title is styled "O'Long of Carrenelongy". The Irish origin also comes from "Lonklin" from county Tipperary and Dublin.

A more uncommon origin of the name originates from Sweden. The names Långbäck and Langbekk arrived in the 13th century in Sweden near the border with Norway. Around the Swedish emigration to the United States the name was anglicised from Långbäck to Longback, Long and Longbrook.

For the specific American political dynasty, see Long family.

For the specific English political dynasty, see Long family of Wiltshire.

Notable people and characters with the surname include those listed below.

== Disambiguation of common given names with this surname ==
- Arthur Long (disambiguation), multiple people
- Ben Long (disambiguation), multiple people
- Bill Long (disambiguation), multiple people
- Bob Long (disambiguation), multiple people
- Carl Long (disambiguation), multiple people
- Charles Long (disambiguation), multiple people
- Chris Long (disambiguation), multiple people
- Christopher Long (disambiguation), multiple people
- David Long (disambiguation), multiple people
- Doc Long (disambiguation), multiple people
- Earl Long (disambiguation), multiple people
- Ed Long (disambiguation), multiple people
- Eddie Long (disambiguation), multiple people
- Edward Long (disambiguation), multiple people
- George Long (disambiguation), multiple people
- Greg Long (disambiguation), multiple people
- Harold Long (disambiguation), multiple people
- Harry Long (disambiguation), multiple people
- Henry Long (disambiguation), multiple people
- Howard Long (disambiguation), multiple people
- Huey Long (disambiguation), multiple people
- Hugh Long (disambiguation), multiple people
- Jake Long (disambiguation), multiple people
- James Long (disambiguation), multiple people
- Jeff Long (disambiguation), multiple people
- Joe Long (disambiguation), multiple people
- John Long (disambiguation), multiple people
- Joseph Long (disambiguation), multiple people
- Kevin Long (disambiguation), multiple people
- Larry Long (disambiguation), multiple people
- Matthew Long (disambiguation), multiple people
- Max Long (disambiguation), multiple people
- Michael Long (disambiguation), multiple people
- Naomi Long (disambiguation), multiple people
- Pamela Long (disambiguation), multiple people
- Richard Long (disambiguation), multiple people
- Robert Long (disambiguation), multiple people
- Samuel Long (disambiguation), multiple people
- Stephen Long (disambiguation), multiple people
- Steven Long (disambiguation), multiple people
- Susan Long (disambiguation), multiple people
- Ted Long (disambiguation), multiple people
- Terry Long (disambiguation), multiple people
- Theodore Long (disambiguation), multiple people
- Thomas Long (disambiguation), multiple people
- Tom Long (disambiguation), multiple people
- Walter Long (disambiguation), multiple people
- William Long (disambiguation), multiple people

== Arts and literature ==
- Bernard Long, British illustrator
- Catharine Long (1797–1867), English novelist
- Edwin Long (1829–1891), English painter
- Frank Belknap Long (1901–1994), American science fiction writer
- Ian Long (born 1965), British author and illustrator
- Leonard Long (1911–2013), Australian painter
- Ruth Frances Long (born 1971), Irish author
- Sydney Long (1871–1955), Australian painter

== Entertainment ==
- Audrey Long (1922–2014), American actress
- Avon Long (1910–1984), American Broadway actor and singer
- Brad Long (actor), American actor
- Charlotte Long (1965–1984), English actress, youngest daughter of the 4th Viscount Long
- David Long (born 1963), Irish singer and guitarist
- Dorian Long, character in the American sitcom Moesha, played by Ray J
- Janice Long (1955–2021), BBC radio presenter, sister of Keith Chegwin
- Jodi Long (born 1954), American actress of Asian descent
- John Long (blues musician) (born 1950), American country blues musician
- Jonathon "Boogie" Long, American blues rock singer, guitarist, and songwriter
- Josie Long (born 1982), English comedian
- Justin Long (born 1978), American actor
- Loretta Long (born 1938), American actress
- Matt Long (born 1980), American actor
- Nia Long (born 1970), American actress
- Norman Long (1893–1951), English comic entertainer
- P.W. Long, American musician
- Pam Long (born 1953), American actress and writer
- Rob Long (born 1965), American screenwriter
- Ronald Long (1911–1986), English actor
- Shelley Long (born 1949), American actress
- Shorty Long (1940–1969), American soul singer
- Tim Long (born 1969), Canadian comedy writer

== History and military ==
- Anne Long (c.1681–1711), English celebrated beauty and London society figure
- Armistead Lindsay Long (1825–1891), American Civil War general
- Beeston Long (1757–1820), English businessman
- Catherine Tylney-Long (1789–1825), English heiress
- Eli Long (1837–1903), American Civil War general
- Jane Herbert Wilkinson Long (1798–1880), Texas pioneer
- Pierse Long (1739–1789), American merchant, soldier and politician
- Selden Long (1895–1952), British WW1 military aviator

== Politics ==
- Armwell Long (1754–1834), American politician and military officer
- Benjamin Long (1838–1877), Swiss-born American politician from Texas
- Beth Long (1948–2024), American politician from Missouri
- Betty Jane Long (1928–2023), American politician from Mississippi
- Billy Long (born 1955), American politician from Missouri
- Blanche Long (1920–1998), American politician from Louisiana
- Breckinridge Long (1881–1958), American diplomat
- Catherine Small Long (1924–2019), American politician from Louisiana
- Chester Deming Long (1819–1884), Wisconsin politician
- Chester I. Long (1860–1934), American politician from Kansas
- Clarence Long (1908–1994), American politician from Maryland
- Dick Long (1924–2021), Australian politician
- Dudley Long (1748–1829), English Whig politician
- Francis R. Long (1812–1818), American politician from Kansas City
- Gene Long (born 1957), Canadian politician from Newfoundland and Labrador
- Gerald Long (born 1944), American politician
- Gifford Long (c. 1576–1635), English politicianand magistrate
- Gillis William Long (1923–1985), American politician from Louisiana
- Huey Long (1893–1935), American politician from Louisiana
- J. C. Long (born 1959), American politician from Kansas
- Jacob Elmer Long (1880–1955), American politician
- Janet Long (born 1944), Florida politician
- Jefferson F. Long (1836–1901), American politician from Georgia
- Jill Long Thompson (born 1952), American politician from Indiana
- Jimmy D. Long (1931–2016), American politician
- Lislebone Long (1613–1659), British politician and Speaker in the House of Commons
- Logan Long (1878–1933), American politician
- Macon M. Long (1885–1988), American politician from Virginia
- Marshall Long (1936–2018), American businessman and politician
- Medicus Long (died 1885), American lawyer
- Naomi Long (born 1971), Northern Ireland politician
- Olivier Long (1915–2003), Swiss ambassador
- Oren E. Long (1889–1965), American politician from Hawaii
- Rose McConnell Long (1892–1970), American politician; wife of Huey
- Russell B. Long (1918–2003), American politician, son of Huey
- Speedy Long (1928–2006), American politician from Louisiana
- Verne Long (1925–2022), American politician and farmer
- Virginia Long (born 1942), American counsel and former justice
- Wayne Long (born 1963), Canadian politician
- Willis K. Long (1930–2001), American politician

== Science and academia ==
- Adrian Long (1941–2022), civil engineer from Northern Ireland
- Crawford Long (1815–1878), American surgeon and pharmacist, first to use ether as an anaesthetic
- Cyril Norman Hugh Long (1901–1970), English-American biochemist
- Hilario Fernández Long (1918–2002), Argentine structural engineer
- Irene D. Long (1950–2020), American physician and NASA chief medical officer
- J. Scott Long, American professor of sociology and statistics
- Lois Long (mycologist) (1918–2005), American scientist, illustrator
- Norton E. Long (1910–1993), American author and professor at Virginia Polytechnic Institute
- Roger Long (1680–1770), English astronomer
- Scott Long (born 1963), American human rights activist

== Sports ==
- Aarran Long (born 2009), Filipino footballer
- Arnold Long (1940–2026), English cricketer
- Asa Long (1904–1999), American checker champion
- Barry Long (ice hockey) (born 1949), Canadian ice hockey player
- Cameron Long (born 1988), American basketball player in the Israeli Premier League
- Charlie Long (1938–1989), American football player
- Dale Long (1926–1991), American baseball player
- Emory Long (1911–1976), American baseball player
- Fred Long (1896–1977), Australian rules footballer
- Fred T. Long (1896–1966), American baseball player and college football coach
- Frederick Long (1815–1903), English clergyman and cricketer
- Geoff Long (1929–2023), Australian rules footballer
- Grant Long (born 1966), American basketball player
- Herman Long (1866–1909), American baseball player
- Howie Long (born 1960), American football Hall of Fame player
- Hunter Long (born 1998), American football player
- Katie Long (born 1988), English field hockey player
- Khari Long (born 1982), American and Canadian football player
- Leo Long, American javelin thrower
- Luz Long (1913–1943), German Olympic long-jumper
- Maxie Long (1878–1959), American athlete
- Philip Long (1948–2026), American swimmer
- Phillip Long (born 1983), American soccer player
- Rien Long (born 1981), American football player
- Rosie Long (born 2006), Canadian wheelchair basketball player
- Ryan Long (born 1973), American baseball player
- Sam Long (baseball) (born 1995), American baseball player
- Sean Long (born 1974), English rugby player
- Sean Long (footballer) (born 1995), Irish footballer
- Shane Long (born 1987), Irish footballer
- Shawn Long (born 1993), American basketball player
- Shed Long Jr. (born 1995), American baseball player
- Shellie Long (born 2000), Papua New Guinean rugby league player
- Stacy Long (born 1985), English footballer
- Stuart Long (1963–2014), American boxer-turned-Catholic priest; inspiration for the 2022 film Father Stu
- Terrence Long (born 1971), American baseball player
- Thelma Coyne Long (1918–2015), Australian tennis player
- Tim Long (American football) (born 1963), American football player

== Miscellaneous ==
- Barry Long (1926–2003), Australian spiritualist
- Brad Long (chef), Canadian celebrity chef
- Cecile Brawley Long (1900–1983), American clubwoman
- Clarence Hailey Long (1910–1978), Texas rancher, famous as original Marlboro Man
- Gregory Long (born 1946), eighth president and CEO of the New York Botanical Garden
- Jennifer Long (died 1998), American murder victim
- Lazarus Long, fictional character of the science-fiction writer Robert A. Heinlein
- Reub Long (1898–1974), Oregon rancher and author
- Zelma Long, American enologist and winemaker

== See also ==
- Laing (surname)
- Lang (surname)
- Lange (surname)
