= John Long =

John or Johnny Long may refer to:

== Music ==
- John Long (blues musician) (born 1950), American country blues singer, fingerstyle guitarist, harmonica player and songwriter
- Johnny Long (musician) (1914–1972), American violinist and big band leader
- John Herbert Long (1904–1985), English music teacher and organist

== Politics ==
- John Long (MP for Cricklade) (c. 1419–1478), English member of parliament (MP) for Cricklade
- John Long (16th-century MP) (c. 1517–c. 1600/1602), MP for Knaresborough, Hedon, Shaftesbury and Newcastle-under-Lyme
- John Long (Florida politician) (1946–2005), American politician from Florida
- John Long (North Carolina politician) (1785–1857), U.S. representative from North Carolina
- John Davis Long (1838–1915), governor of Massachusetts, later the U.S. Secretary of the Navy
- John B. Long (1843–1924), U.S. representative from Texas
- John Andrew Long (1869–1941), senator in Northern Ireland
- John David Long (1901–1967), South Carolina state senator
- John H. Long (political candidate) (fl. late 20th–early 21st centuries), Canadian political figure
- J. H. Long (John Henry Long, 1845–1898), American politician
- John V. Long (1826–1869), member of the Utah territorial legislature and clerk for Brigham Young

== Science ==
- John Long (computer scientist) (1935–2025), British computer scientist
- John A. Long (born 1957), Australian paleontologist and author of children's books and popular science and adventure books
- John H. Long (chemist) (1856–1918), president of the American Chemical Society

== Sports ==
- John Long (climber) (born 1953), American rock climber and writer
- John Long (basketball player) (born 1956), American basketball player
- Johnny Long (American football) (1914–1975), American football quarterback
- John Long (basketball coach), college men's basketball coach
- John Long (Australian footballer) (born 1946), Australian rules footballer
- John Long (Gaelic footballer) (born 1952), Irish Gaelic footballer

== Other fields ==
- John Long (artist) (1964–2016), artist and painter from Northern Ireland
- John Long (evangelist) (1872–1962), Pentecostal preacher
- John Long (priest) (1913–2008), Anglican Archdeacon of Ely
- John Dixon Long (1817–1894), American abolitionist
- John Luther Long (1861–1927), American lawyer and writer whose short story "Madame Butterfly" inspired the opera by Puccini
- John Long (died 1935), founder of John Long Ltd, a now-defunct publishing firm based in London
- John F. Long (1920–2008), American real-estate developer, philanthropist
- John St. John Long (1798–1834), Irish–born quack doctor

== See also ==
- John Longe (1548–1589), English Protestant archbishop of Armagh
- John Longe (priest) (1765–1834), priest and county magistrate
