= Patrick Long (disambiguation) =

Patrick Long is a race car driver.

Patrick Long may also refer to:

- Patrick James Long (1864–1934), American businessman and politician
- Patrick Long (New Hampshire state senator), New Hampshire senator first elected in 2024
- Patrick Long (New Hampshire state representative), New Hampshire state representative first elected in 2024
- Patrick Long, High Sheriff of Limerick City
- Patrick Long, character in Alice Upside Down
