= R. A. Long =

R. A. Long may refer to:

- Robert A. Long (1850–1934), an American lumber baron
- Reub Long (1898–1974), an American rancher and author
