= Arthur Long =

Arthur Long may refer to:

- A. A. Long (born 1937), British and American classics scholar
- Art Long (born 1972), American former basketball player
- Arthur Long (British Army officer) (1866–1941), British brigadier-general
- Arthur Leonard Long (1896–1954), Australian aviator
