= Howard Long (disambiguation) =

Howard Long (1905–1939) was an American convicted murderer.

Howard Long may also refer to:

- Howie Long (born 1960), American former National Football League (NFL) defensive end
- Howard Rusk Long (1906–1988), American journalist and author
- Howard Hale Long (1888–1948), American educational psychologist

== See also ==
- Christopher Howard Long (born 1985), former American football defensive end
- Kyle Howard Long (born 1988), former American football guard
- Howard Longley House, historic house in South Pasadena, California
