= David Long =

David Long may refer to:

- David Long (New Zealand musician), New Zealand musician and composer
- Dave Long (runner) (born 1960), former long-distance runner from Great Britain
- Dave Long (American football) (born 1944), American football defensive lineman
- David Long (defensive back) (born 1998), also called David Long Jr., American football cornerback
- David Long Jr. (linebacker) (born 1996), American football linebacker
- David Long (mandolin player) (born 1975), mandolin player from Nashville, Tennessee
- David C. Long (born 1955), Indiana state senator
- David H. Long (born 1961), American businessman
- David Martin Long (1953–1999), American murderer
- David P. Long (born 1975), American educator and canon lawyer
- David Ryan Long, author
- David Long (born 1948), American short story writer and novelist
