= Facial masking =

Facial masking may refer to:

- Facial mask, the application of a treatment to a person's face for cosmetic purposes or for health benefits.
- Hypomimia, a medical sign whereby a patient appears to have limited facial expression due to a disease condition.
