= Charles Long =

Charles Long may refer to:

- Charles Long (ABSRA) (born 1945), founder of the America's Buffalo Soldiers Re-Enactors Association, convicted of manslaughter
- Charles R. Long (1923–1951), United States Army soldier and Medal of Honor recipient
- Charles G. Long (1869–1943), assistant commandant of the Marine Corps
- Charles Long, 1st Baron Farnborough (1760–1838), English politician and connoisseur of the arts
- Charles Edward Long (1796–1861), English genealogist and antiquary
- Charlie Long (1938–1989), American football guard
- Charles Wigram Long (1842–1911), British member of parliament for Evesham 1895–1910
- Charles Edwin Long (1879–1953), American-born farmer and political figure in Saskatchewan, Canada
- Charles L. Long (1851–1929), Massachusetts lawyer, judge and politician
- Charles Long (priest) (1802–1875), Anglican priest
- Charles D. Long (1841–1902), Michigan Supreme Court justice
- Charles H. Long (1926–2020), American historian of religion and African-American scholar
- Charles W. Long (born 1940), American politician, member of the Massachusetts House of Representatives
- Chuck Long (born 1963), American football player and coach
