= Thomas Long =

Thomas Long may refer to:

== Politicians ==
- Thomas Long (Ontario politician) (1836–1920), Ontario merchant and political figure
- Thomas Long (fl.1407–1437), MP for Rye
- Thomas Long of Draycot (c. 1451–1508), English knight and politician
- Thomas Long (died 1593), MP for Westbury
- Thomas Long (captain) (1814–1875), American whaler
- Thomas W. Long (1929–2024), American politician in the New Jersey General Assembly
- Thomas Warren Long (1839–1917), African Methodist Episcopal minister and politician in Florida

== Others ==
- Thomas Long (writer) (1621–1707), English clergyman and controversialist
- Thomas J. Long (c. 1910–1993), American accountant and businessman who co-founded Longs Drugs
- Thomas G. Long (born 1946), American preacher
- Thomas Long (baseball) (1860–1914), baseball player

== See also ==
- Tom Long (disambiguation)
