= Tom Long =

Tom Long may refer to:

- Tom Long (actor) (1968–2020), Australian actor, born in the United States
- Tom Long (CEO) (born 1958), American president and COO of MillerCoors and former CEO of Miller Brewing Company
- Tom Long (pitcher) (1898–1973), Major League Baseball pitcher for the 1924 Brooklyn Robins
- Tom Long (outfielder) (1890–1972), Major League Baseball outfielder from 1911 to 1917
- Tom Long (politician) (born 1958), Canadian conservative strategist
- Tom Long (hangman) (died 1908), New Zealand government hangman
- Tom Long (Gaelic footballer) (1936–2023), Irish Gaelic footballer
- Tom Long (racing driver) (born 1982), American racing driver
- Thomas Warren Long (1839–1917), African Methodist Episcopal minister and politician

== See also ==
- Thomas Long (disambiguation)
