= Bob Long (disambiguation) =

Bob Long (1941–2025) was an American football wide receiver.

Bob Long may also refer to:

- Bob Long (linebacker) (born 1934), American football linebacker
- Bob Long (halfback) (1922–1961), American football halfback
- Bobby Long (child actor) (1932–2005), American child actor, star of It Happened in Brooklyn
- Bob Long (baseball) (born 1954), former Major League Baseball pitcher
- Bobby Long (musician) (born 1985), British singer-songwriter
- Bob Long (politician) (born 1957), councillor, Township of Langley first elected in 1999

== See also ==
- Bobby Joe Long (1953–2019), American serial killer and rapist
- Robert Long (disambiguation)
- A Love Song for Bobby Long, a 2004 film
