= Naomi Long (disambiguation) =

Naomi Long may refer to:

- Naomi Long (born 1971), Northern Irish politician
- Naomi Long Madgett (1923–2020), African-American poet

== See also ==
- Naomi Lang, American ice dancer
- Virginia and Naomi Leong
