= William Long =

William Long may refer to:

== Politicians ==
- William Long (MP for Barnstaple, 1388)
- William Long (died c.1426), MP and Mayor for Rye
- William Long (mayor) (1781–1851), mayor of Columbus, Ohio
- William Long (antiquary) (1817–1886), English antiquarian
- William Long (New South Wales politician) (1839–1915), race-horse owner and Colonial Treasurer of New South Wales
- William Long (Australian politician) (1885–1957), member of the Australian Parliament for Lang
- William Long (Northern Ireland politician) (1922–2008), Unionist politician in Northern Ireland
- William Houston Long (1843–1912), member of the Queensland Legislative Council
- Brock Long (born 1975), full name William Brockmann Long, Administrator of the U.S. Federal Emergency Management Agency
- Billy Long (born 1955), American politician

== Others ==
- William J. Long (1867–1952), American nature writer
- William Ivey Long (born 1947), American costume designer
- William Long (rowing) (1935–2010), American Olympic athlete
- William Long (surgeon) (1747–1818), English surgeon
- Private William Long, murdered in the 2009 Little Rock recruiting office shooting
- William Long (priest) (died 1835), Canon of Windsor
- William Henry Long (1867–1947), American mycologist
- Will West Long (c. 1869–1947), Cherokee mask maker, a translator, and a Cherokee cultural historian

== See also ==
- Bill Long (disambiguation)
