= Robert Long =

Robert Long may refer to:

== Politicians ==
- Robert Long (lawyer and landowner) (c. 1391–1447), English lawyer, landowner, and member of parliament
- Sir Robert Long, 1st Baronet (c. 1600–1673), auditor of the Exchequer
- Sir Robert Long, 6th Baronet (1705–1767), British politician
- Robert Long (soldier) (c. 1517–c. 1581), esquire of the body of Henry VIII of England
- Robert Gavin Long (1937–2011), politician in Saskatchewan, Canada
- Robert M. Long (1895–1977), politician in Wisconsin, United States
- Robert B. Long (born 1957), American politician from Maryland
- Rob Long (Florida politician) (born 1985)

== Military ==
- Robert L. J. Long (1920–2002), U.S. Navy admiral
- Robert Ballard Long (1771–1825), British general
- Robert Long (British Army officer) (1937–2014), last Colonel of the Royal Hampshire Regiment

== Sports ==
- Robert Long (English cricketer) (1846–1924), English cricketer
- Robert Long (New Zealand cricketer) (1932–2010), New Zealand cricketer
- Robert C. Long (born 1959), American baseball umpire

== Others ==
- Robert Long (priest) (1833–1907), British Anglican priest, archdeacon of Auckland
- Robert Cary Long Jr. (1810–1849), American architect
- Robert A. Long (1850–1934), American lumber baron and philanthropist
- Robert Edward Crozier Long (1872–1938), Anglo-Irish journalist and author
- Robert Spencer Long (1927–2015), president of Shimer College
- Robert Long (singer) (1943–2006), Dutch singer and television presenter
- Rob Long (born 1965), American screenwriter
- Robert Aaron Long (born 1999), perpetrator of the 2021 Atlanta spa shooting spree killings
- Robert Paul Long, convicted of setting the Childers Palace Backpackers Hostel fire
- Bobby Joe Long (1953–2019), Florida serial killer also known as Robert Joe Long

== See also ==
- Bob Long (disambiguation)
