= Jeff Long =

Jeff or Jeffrey Long may refer to:

- Jeff Long (athletic director) (born 1959), American athletics director
- Jeff Long (writer) (born 1951), American writer
- Jeff Long (sheriff), American commissioner
- Jeffrey Long, American author and researcher on near-death experiences
- Jeffrey C. Long, American genetic anthropologist
- Jeffery D. Long, (born 1969), American scholar of religious studies
- Jeffrey R. Long (born 1969), American inorganic and materials chemist

== See also ==
- Jeoff Long (born 1941), American former professional baseball player
- Geoff Long (1929–2023), Australian rules footballer
