= Edward Long =

Edward Long may refer to:

- Edward Long (historian) (1734–1813), British-born planter, historian and writer
- Edward Henry Carroll Long (1808–1865), US Representative from Maryland
- Edward V. Long (1908–1972), US Senator from Missouri

== See also ==
- Ed Long (disambiguation)
- Eddie Long (disambiguation)
- Ted Long (disambiguation)
