= Bill Long =

Bill Long may refer to:

- Bill Long (ice hockey) (1917–2006), Canadian ice hockey player and coach
- Bill Long (American football) (1926–1995), American football player
- Bill Long (politician) (1927–2000), member of the Indiana House of Representatives from 1973 to 1982
- Bill Long (writer) (1932–2010), Irish writer and broadcaster
- Billy Long (born 1955), U.S. representative from Missouri (2011-2023)
- Bill Long (baseball) (born 1960), American baseball pitcher
- Bill Long (artist) (fl. 1990s), American artist and illustrator of MTV's Beavis and Butt-head

== See also ==
- Bill Long Award, Ontario Hockey League award named for the ice hockey player
- William Long (disambiguation)
