= James Long =

James Long, Jim Long, or Jimmy Long may refer to:

== Politics ==
- Sir James Long, 2nd Baronet (1617–1692), English politician and Royalist soldier
- Sir James Long, 5th Baronet (1682–1729), English politician
- Sir James Tylney-Long, 7th Baronet (1736–1794), English politician
- James Long (Australian politician) (1870–1932), Australian Senator
- James E. Long (1940–2009), American government figure in North Carolina
- Patrick James Long (1864–1934), American businessman and politician in Minnesota
- Jim Long (Kansas politician) (1936-1998), American politician and member of the Kansas House of Representatives
- Jimmy D. Long (1931-2016), American politician and member of the Louisiana House of Representatives

== Military ==
- James Long (British Army officer), British Army officer of the 18th century
- James Long (filibuster) (1793–1822), American military figure

== Sports ==
- Carl Long (born 1967 as James Carlyle Long), American stock car driver
- Jim Long (American football) (1926–2014), American football and track and field coach, athletics administrator.
- Jim Long (baseball) (1862–1932), American baseball player
- Jim Long (darts player) (born 1968), Canadian darts player
- Jimmy Long (footballer) (1880 – after 1907), Scottish professional footballer

== Other ==
- J. B. Long (1903–1975), American store manager, owner, and record company talent scout
- James Long (director), Canadian playwright and theatre director
- James Long (priest) (1814–1887), Anglo-Irish priest, missionary and scholar
- James D. Long (born 1948), American author and former radio personality
- Jim Long (businessman) (1943–2022), American entrepreneur in the broadcast music industry
- R. James Long (born 1938), American academic and professor of philosophy

== See also ==
- James Leong (1929–2011), Chinese-American artist
