= It Happened in Brooklyn =

1947 film by Richard Whorf

- Directed by: Richard Whorf
- Screenplay by: Isobel Lennart
- Story by: Jack McGowan
- Produced by: Jack Cummings
- Starring: Frank Sinatra; Peter Lawford; Kathryn Grayson; Jimmy Durante
- Cinematography: Robert H. Planck
- Edited by: Blanche Sewell
- Music by: Johnny Green
- Production company: Metro-Goldwyn-Mayer
- Distributed by: Loew's Inc.
- Release date: April 7, 1947
- Running time: 104 minutes
- Country: United States
- Language: English
- Budget: $1,819,000
- Box office: $2,664,000

It Happened in Brooklyn is a 1947 American musical romantic comedy film directed by Richard Whorf, starring Frank Sinatra, Kathryn Grayson, Peter Lawford and Jimmy Durante, and featuring Gloria Grahame and Marcy McGuire. It was Sinatra's third film for Metro-Goldwyn-Mayer, which had purchased his contract from RKO (due to Louis B. Mayer being a huge Sinatra fan).

The film contains six songs written by Sammy Cahn and Jule Styne, and included "The Song's Gotta Come From the Heart" (performed as a duet by Sinatra and Durante), "The Brooklyn Bridge", "Whose Baby Are You", "I Believe", "Time After Time", and "It's the Same Old Dream".

== Plot ==
Danny Miller is with a group of GIs awaiting transportation home to the US. On his last night there, he meets Jamie Shellgrove, who is a very shy young man whose grandfather feels should be taken under someone's wing. After observing Miller come to his grandson's aid at the piano, he asks Danny to speak with his son, to give him "some words of encouragement". In order to look good in front of the Brooklyn-born nurse who scolded him for not making friends, he agrees, even going so far as to saying what would really fix Jamie up would be for him to come to Brooklyn. As he rushes out to catch his transport to the docks for the voyage home, Danny discovers that Jamie is really the heir to a duke. Upon Danny's return to Brooklyn, the film revolves around characters realizing their dreams of escaping working-class drudgery: in Sinatra's case to become a singer/musician rather than a shipping clerk, in Lawford's case to break out of his extreme shyness to gain a wife and a career as a songwriter, and in Fielding's case to break out of her school teaching job to star in the opera (although this last is not shown coming to pass, but she presumably lives happily ever after as she is brought to England as the fiancée of the Lawford character, who is heir to a dukedom). The story ends with Danny realizing the nurse he talked to at the start of the film is the only girl for him, and since he figures she's got to be back in Brooklyn herself, and he's got all kinds of friends now, he's optimistic about finding and winning her.

== Cast ==
- Frank Sinatra as Danny Webson Miller
- Kathryn Grayson as Anne Fielding
- Peter Lawford as Jamie Shellgrove
- Jimmy Durante as Nick Lombardi
- Gloria Grahame as Nurse
- Marcy McGuire as Rae Jakobi
- Aubrey Mather as Digby John
- Tamara Shayne as Mrs. Kardos
- William Roy as Leo Kardos (as Billy Roy)
- William Haade as Police Sergeant
- Bobby Long as Johnny O'Brien

== Production ==
The original director was supposed to be George Sidney, but he was replaced by Richard Whorf, who is probably best known for his television directing, particularly The Beverly Hillbillies, Gunsmoke and My Three Sons.

Filming was interrupted for approximately ten days when Durante had to finish filming on This Time for Keeps.

The piano solos for the film were performed by a teenaged André Previn, under the musical direction of Johnny Green. Sinatra's vocal arrangements were orchestrated by Axel Stordahl.

Kathryn Grayson is heard performing "The Bell Song" from the Leo Delibes opera Lakme, lip-synching to a pre-recorded audio track that was the product of much recording and editing time. Andre Previn later wrote: “The Bell Song is not easy; it spends a lot of time in the stratospheric heights of coloratura tessitura, and it was all a bit much for our heroine. What is heard on the finished sound track is the result of over 150 edited intercuts, meaning that almost every squeak is from a different take.”

=== Bobby Long ===
This was the only feature film appearance of child actor Bobby Long (the stage name of Bobby Earl Logsdon) who plays Johnny O'Brien and performs "I Believe" in a tap dancing and singing number. Long began performing at an early age, touring around the country after being discovered on the Major Bowes show. His only other documented appearance on film is in the 1942 Soundie Club Lollypop. He seems to have ceased performing by the end of 1947 for reasons that are unknown. By the age of 18 he was living in New York with his father, Hubert Earl Logsdon, according to the 1950 US Census. He enlisted in the Navy and served from 1951 to 1955, By 1960, Logsdon had settled in California and married Myrtle Stone. They were divorced in 1971. In 1984 he met and married Diane Sayer. Together, they lived in Mission Viejo, CA until his death in 2005 due to complications from Parkinson's Disease at age 73.

== Box office ==
The film earned $1,877,000 in the US and Canada and $787,000 elsewhere, resulting a loss of $138,000.

Variety says the film earned $2,150,000 in rentals.

== Critical reception ==
It Happened in Brooklyn was generally well received, Variety noting that: "Much of the lure will result from Frank Sinatra's presence in the cast. Guy's acquired the Bing Crosby knack of nonchalance, throwing away his gag lines with fine aplomb. He kids himself in a couple of hilarious sequences and does a takeoff on Jimmy Durante, with Durante aiding him, that's sockeroo."
