= Harry Long (disambiguation) =

Harry Long (1897–1945) was a college football coach and biology professor.

Harry Long may also refer to:

- Harry Long (footballer) (1910–2003), Australian rules footballer
- Harry Long, character in The Invisible Monster
- Mrs Harry H. Long, who launched USS Hoel

== See also ==
- Harold Long (disambiguation)
- Henry Long (disambiguation)
- Long Harry, English clergyman and politician
