= E. R. Jackman =

American writer (1894–1967)

E.R. Jackman
- Oregon author and agriculture expert
- Born: February 14, 1894; Stillwater, Minnesota, USA
- Died: May 12, 1967 (aged 73); Portland, Oregon, USA
- Occupation: Agricultural Extension Agent
- Writing career
- Subjects: Oregon history, culture, geography, and environment
- Notable works: The Oregon Desert (1964); Steens Mountain in Oregon's High Desert Country (1967)
- Notable awards: U.S. Department of Agriculture Superior Service Award

Edwin Russell (E.R.) Jackman (February 14, 1894 – May 12, 1967) was an American agricultural expert from Oregon. He helped form the Oregon Seed Growers' League and the Oregon Wheat League. In 1964, he joined Reub Long to write The Oregon Desert, which is still a very popular book fifty years after its original publication. Jackman's professional papers and photograph collection are maintained in the Oregon State University archives.

== Early life ==
Jackman was born on February 14, 1894, in Stillwater, Minnesota. He grew up on his father's 185-acre (0.75 km^{2}) potato, grain, and livestock farm in Flathead County, Montana. From 1913 to 1917, he attended Montana State College in Bozeman (now Montana State University - Bozeman). He then served briefly as an Agricultural Extension Agent in Blaine County, Montana, before entering the United States Army in the fall of 1917. He was stationed at Fort Sill, Oklahoma, where he served as a First Lieutenant in the Field Artillery. Following World War I, Jackman attended Oregon Agricultural College (now Oregon State University). He majored in Agronomy, receiving a Bachelor of Science in 1921.

== Agriculture expert ==
After he graduated from Oregon Agricultural College, Jackman was appointed the state's Agricultural Extension Agent for Wasco County, Oregon. As an extension agent, he worked for Oregon State University as part of the United States Department of Agriculture's Federal Cooperative Extension Service (now known as the Cooperative State Research, Education, and Extension Service. In this capacity, he was responsible for advising local farmers and ranchers on modern agricultural techniques, land use, and recommended conservation practices. In 1926, he resigned to enter commercial business, but returned to the Extension Service in 1929. From 1929 until 1953, he served as a farm crop specialist; then from 1953 until his retirement in 1959, he was engaged as a range crop management specialist.

Jackman helped organize the Oregon Seed Growers' League, serving as the organization's secretary for many years. He also played a leading role in creating the Oregon Wheat League, which was subsequently copied across the United States. As president of the Pacific Northwest chapter of the American Society of Range Management, Jackman started a Youth Range Camp program in 1950. The camp is now a well established annual event. He was a member of the national extension honorary fraternity, Epsilon Sigma Phi. In 1949, Jackman was awarded the fraternity's Western States Certificate of Recognition. In 1956, he received the United States Department of Agriculture's Superior Service Award for his success in promoting grassland agriculture and for helping to develop Oregon's multimillion-dollar seed industry. In 1957, the Oregon Farm Bureau Federation recognized Jackman with their Distinguished Service to Oregon Agriculture award.

== Books ==
After he retired from the Extension Service, Jackman wrote four books. In 1962, he wrote Gold and Cattle Country along with Herman Oliver. In 1964, he joined Reub Long to write The Oregon Desert, which remains an extremely popular work over forty years after it original publication. The book highlights Eastern Oregon history, high desert geology, rural culture, and native folklore. It is also filled with Reub Long's humorous stories. As of 2003, the book was in its fourteenth printing. In 1967, Jackman co-authored two other books. First, he worked with Charles Simpson to produce Blazing Forest Trails, then Jackman joined John Scharff to write Steens Mountain in Oregon's High Desert Country. Like The Oregon Desert, his Steens Mountain book is still available decades after its original publication.

== Legacy ==
Jackman died in Portland, Oregon, on May 12, 1967. His legacy includes the E.R. Jackman Foundation, which was created in his honor to support Oregon State University's College of Agricultural Sciences. Oregon State University also sponsors the E.R. Jackman Internship Support Program, which provides financial assistance to undergraduate students enrolled in the university's College of Agricultural Sciences.

The Oregon State University library holds Jackman's professional papers and photograph collection. The Edwin Russell Jackman Papers include manuscripts, personal papers and other archival materials. These files contain articles written for Oregon State University publications, national publications, and specialized trade journals. It also has tapes of radio and television talks, Jackman's speech notes, and the manuscripts for his four books. The university also maintains the Edwin Russell Jackman Photographic Collection. The photographs cover a wide range of agricultural subjects, Pacific Northwest geographical and geological features, Oregon state parks, and rural towns as well as photographs of farmers and ranchers at work. It also includes a number of photographs of Reub Long, his Fort Rock ranch, and his collection of Native American artifacts. Jackman used many of the photographs in his books. Summaries of Jackman's papers and photograph collection are available on-line through the Oregon State University library archives and records management program.

The best known building on the Oregon State Fairgrounds is named in honor of Jackman and Reub Long. The Jackman-Long Building was opened in 1976. It is a 48,000 square feet (4,500 m^{2}) exposition center that also houses the Oregon State Fair and Exposition Center's main office.
