= Richard Long =

Richard Long may refer to:

== English politicians ==
- Richard Long (MP for Old Sarum), 15th-century Member of Parliament (MP); see Old Sarum (UK Parliament constituency)
- Richard Long (courtier) (c. 1494–1546), Gentleman of the Privy Chamber to Henry VIII; knighted in 1537; MP for Southwark (1539)
- Richard Long (died 1730) (1668–1730), Whig MP for Chippenham, Wiltshire; supporter of the Immorality Bill; sheriff of Wiltshire (1702–1703)
- Richard Long (died 1760) (c. 1691–1760), member of the Long family of Wiltshire; first son of the above; MP for Chippenham
- Richard Godolphin Long (1761–1835), another member of the Long family; grandson of the above; MP for Wiltshire (1806–1818)
- Richard Penruddocke Long (1825–1875), further member of the Long family; MP for Chippenham (1859–1865) and North Wiltshire (1865–1868)
- Richard Long, 3rd Viscount Long (1892–1967), later member of Wiltshire's Long family; MP for Westbury (1927–1931)
- Richard Long, 4th Viscount Long (1929–2017), second son of the above; Conservative peer

== Others ==
- Richard Long (actor) (1927–1974), American performer best known for the TV series The Big Valley and Nanny and the Professor
- Richard Long (artist) (born 1945), English sculptor, photographer and painter who, after four nominations, won the Turner Prize in 1989
- Richard Long (broadcaster) (born c. 1955), New Zealand newsreader who achieved popularity during a 17-year TV career (1987–2003)
- Richard Long (journalist) (born c. 1940), New Zealand journalist, former editor of The Dominion
- Richard A. Long (1927–2013), African-American historian
- Richard H. Long (1865–1957), American businessman and politician
- Rikard Long (1889–1977), Faroese teacher, writer and politician
- Dick Long (1924–2021), Australian politician

== See also ==
- Long (Western surname)
