= Emotional expression =

Behaviors that communicate emotions

An emotional expression is a behavior that communicates an emotional state or attitude. It can be verbal or nonverbal, and can occur with or without self-awareness. Emotional expressions include facial movements like smiling or scowling, simple behaviors like crying, laughing, or saying "thank you," and more complex behaviors like writing a letter or giving a gift. Individuals have some conscious control of their emotional expressions; however, they need not have conscious awareness of their emotional or affective state in order to express emotion.

Researchers in psychology have proposed many different and often competing theoretical models to explain emotions and emotional expression, going as far back as Charles Darwin's discussion of emotion as an evolved capacity. Though there is no universally accepted theory of emotion, theorists in emotion agree that experience of emotions and expression of them in a variety of ways, such as with voices, faces, and bodies, is key to human communication. The cultural norms and beliefs of a society also affect and shape the emotional expressions of its members, and expressions appropriate and important in one culture may be taboo in another.

High expressiveness could be useful in constructively resolving relationship-related conflict.

== Models of emotion ==
There are many different theories about the nature of emotion and the way that it is represented in the brain and body. Of the elements that distinguish between the theories of emotion, perhaps the most salient is differing perspectives on emotional expression.

Some theories about emotion consider emotions to be biologically basic and stable across people and cultures. These are often called "basic emotion" perspectives because they view emotion as biologically basic. From this perspective, an individual's emotional expressions are sufficient to determine a person's internal, emotional state. If a person is smiling, they are happy. If a person is crying, they are sad. Each emotion has a consistent and specific pattern of expressions, and that pattern of responses is only expressed during that emotion and not during other emotions. Facial emotional expressions are particularly salient stimuli for transferring important nonverbal signals to others. For that reason, emotional expressions are the best direct indicators of affective attitudes and dispositions. There is growing evidence that brain regions generally engaged in the processing of emotional information are also activated during the processing of facial emotions.

Some theories of emotion take the stance that emotional expression is more flexible, and that there is a cognitive component to emotion. These theories account for the malleability in emotion by proposing that humans appraise situations and, depending on the result of their appraisal, different emotions and the corresponding expressions of emotion are triggered. The tendency to appraise certain situations as one emotion or another can vary by person and culture; however, appraisal models still maintain that there are basic responses that are specific and consistent to each emotion that humans feel.

Other theories of emotion propose that emotions are constructed based upon the person, situation, culture, and past experiences, and that there are no preset emotional responses that are consistent and specific to one emotion or another.

=== Basic model ===
The basic model of emotions finds its roots in Charles Darwin's The Expression of Emotions in Man and Animals. Darwin claimed that the expression of emotions involves many systems: facial expression, behavioral response, and physical responses, which include physiological, postural, and vocal changes. Most importantly, Darwin claimed that emotional expression was consistent with his theories on evolution and thus, the expression of emotion is universal and should therefore be expressed similarly across race or culture. This is known as the universality hypothesis. Lastly, primates and animals exhibit precursors of muscle actions of the facial expressions of humans.

Many researchers have expanded on Darwin's original theories on emotional expression. Paul Ekman and Carroll Izard were the first to test Darwin's theory. These psychologists, through cross-cultural empirical tests found that there were a number of basic emotions that were universally recognized. Later studies suggested that facial expressions are unique to each emotion and are signals that convey information of one's internal state, and this information is used to coordinate social interactions. Overall, the basic emotion perspective assumes that emotions are unique events that occur as a result of special mechanisms, and each emotion has its own respective specific brain circuit. Moreover, the expression of each emotion has its own respective response, manifestation in face, voice, and body.

Further, recent research on emotional expression across different cultures indicates that while some emotions, such as fear response, appear to be universally experienced, the way emotions are expressed tends to vary significantly depending on cultural context, occasionally for basic emotions as well. This variation can be attributed to differences between independent and interdependent cultures, which shape individuals' perceptions of the self and influence the specific emotions that are emphasized within each cultural framework. As a result, cultural norms and values directly affect how individuals express their emotions, highlighting the complex interplay between cultural background and emotional experience.

The basic emotion view brought Ekman to create the Facial Action Coding System (FACS) and Facial Expression Awareness Compassion Emotions (FACE). FACS is a database of compiled facial expressions, wherein each facial movement is termed an action unit (AU). FACE explains how to become keen at observing emotion in the faces of others. It consists of the Micro Expression Training Tool (METT), which trains individuals to disambiguate between emotional expressions through recognizing distinct facial expressions that are unique to each emotion. The second part of this training program trains individuals to read microexpressions; a face elicits an emotion very quickly and the individual is prompted to report which emotion was seen. The Subtle Expression Training Tool (SETT) trains individuals to be able to recognize the subtle changes in a person's facial expression due to slight changes in emotional experiences. These subtle expressions can occur at the onset of emotions, or when an individual is actively suppressing the emotion.

=== Appraisal model ===
Appraisal models of emotion propose that emotions are triggered by specific mental states, each with their own distinct form and function. Like the basic model of emotion, appraisal models suggest that once an emotion is activated, its expression is biologically programmed and manifests consistently whenever that emotion is experienced.

The main difference between basic emotion models and appraisal models is that appraisal models assume that there is a cognitive antecedent that determines which emotion is triggered. Emotions go beyond simple judgments of stimuli in our environment and are forms of motivation that drive action. Traditional appraisal theories consider appraisals to be universal and like a set of switches that can be turned on by biological and environmental triggers. When a person makes an appraisal, an individual will react with an appropriate, emotional response that can include an external, emotional expression.

The appraisal model supports the idea that emotions are not solely positive or negative attitudes towards an attitude object, but they are motivated states that drive action. They take priority over any other behaviours and mediate physiological responses to stimuli, that either motivate us to terminate or maintain that stimuli. For example, if you encounter an unfair situation, you would act on it to terminate the unfairness. According to appraisal theory, the reason for your action is your motivated state to stop the unfair treatment, which, we call, emotion. Existing studies also demonstrated that whether a behaviour is through autonomous or controlled motivation, depends on the intensity and context of underlying emotion.

More recent appraisal models account for variation in emotional expression by suggesting that cognitive appraisals are more like themes that can be triggered by a number of different actions and situations. Emotional expressions arise from these appraisals, which essentially describe the context of the situation. One appraisal model has developed the law of situational meaning, which states that emotions tend to be evoked by certain kinds of events. For example, grief is elicited by personal loss. In this case, personal loss would be the appraisal and one can be expressed through emotional expressions.

=== Psychological construction model ===
Another model of emotion, called psychological construction, describes emotion as a construction that results from more basic psychological processes. In a psychological construction model, basic psychological processes like affect (positive or negative feeling combined with some degree of physiological activation), previous experiences, language, and executive functioning combine to form a discrete emotion experience. This perspective is extensively explored in Lisa Feldman Barrett's work, The Psychological Construction of Emotion, which argues that emotions are not biologically hardwired but rather emerge from core psychological ingredients. While some discrete emotions tend to have typical responses (e.g. crying when sad, laughing when happy), a psychological construction model can account for the wide variability in emotional expression (e.g. crying when extremely happy; laughing when uncomfortable).

Psychological construction models call into question the assumption that there are basic, discrete emotion expressions that are universally recognized. Many basic emotion studies use highly posed, stereotypical facial expressions as emotional signals such as a pout, which would indicate one is feeling sad. These facial expressions can be better understood as symbols of emotion rather than signals. Research by Barrett et al. (2019) challenges the idea that facial expressions directly correspond to specific emotions, arguing instead that their meaning is shaped by context and prior experience. While these symbols have undeniable emotional meaning and are consistently observed during day-day emotional behavior, they do not have a 1-to-1 relationship a person's internal mental or emotional state. For example, not everyone furrows their brow when they are feeling angry. Moreover, these emotional symbols are not universal due to cultural differences. For example, when Western individuals are asked to identify an emotional expression on a specific face, in an experimental task, they focus on the target's facial expression. Japanese individuals use the information of the surrounding faces to determine the emotional state of the target face. This challenges experiments that solely use a presentation of an isolated emotional expression in experiments because it is reflecting just a Western notion of emotion.

=== Social construction model ===
Social construction models generally say that there is no biological circuitry for emotions since emotions are solely based on experience and context. Some even suggest that certain emotions can only exist in the reciprocal exchanges of a social encounter. Since there are unique local languages and local moral orders, cultures can use the same emotion and expression in very different ways. Thus, emotional expressions are culturally-prescribed performances rather than internal mental events. Knowing a social script for a certain emotion allows one to enact the emotional behaviors that are appropriate for the cultural context. Emotional expressions serve a social function and are essentially a way of reaching out to the world.

== Emotion regulation ==
Various researchers have highlighted the importance for an individual of being able to successfully regulate emotions. Regulation is an active, goal-oriented process that aims to manage emotional responses. Ways of doing this include cognitive reappraisal (interpreting a situation in positive terms) and expressive suppression (masking signs of inner emotional states). The extended process model of emotion regulation outlines several stages: identifying the need to regulate, selecting appropriate strategies, implementing those strategies and monitoring their effectiveness over time. While cognitive reappraisal and expressive suppression can be effective, complications in any stage can contribute to emotional dysregulation, which is associated with various mental health conditions, such as anxiety and depression. Emotions are evident through facial expressions. Humans can express their own emotions and understand others as well. Humans can quickly identify happy expressions whereas the disgust expression takes longer to identify.

Emotional dysregulation is also closely linked to trauma, particularly in children and adolescents. Research suggests that youth with histories of trauma are significantly more likely to experience challenges in emotion regulation, which can manifest as heightened emotional lability, aggression or difficulty calming down after stress. Normal development processes are often disrupted, including the ability to process and express emotions effectively. Trauma-informed approaches have been shown to help address these issues by targeting both emotional dysregulation and the underlying trauma triggers. The presence of protective factors, like supportive caregivers or stable environments, can help lessen the severity of emotional dysregulation in trauma-exposed youth, highlighting the role of both environmental and individual factors in the regulation process.

=== Emotional intelligence ===
Theorists such as Gardner and Sternberg have each presented different definitions and categories of intelligence. Richard Gunderman refers to emotional intelligence as a type of intelligence, in addition to the commonly used definition. He has defined it as "the ability to understand and respond to emotions in daily life". For instance, a person who does not face his or her emotions and tackle them may be constantly frustrated. This person will face troubles moving on with his or her life. Consequently, emotionally intelligent individuals are better at expressing and identifying their emotions and those of the people around them. Those who are adept at handling their emotions tend to live an easier life than those who are not. Since people with better emotional intelligence are sensitive to emotions, they are considered better team players and are family-oriented.

Some researchers argue that emotional intelligence is biological, while others say it is innate. Gunderman states that emotional intelligence is a learned and an instinctual skill. According to him, it can be cultivated through three means: learning more about it, drawing attention to it for oneself and others, and reading the works of authors he considers to be emotionally intelligent, such as Jane Austen and Leo Tolstoy. Through engaging in emotional expressions and regulation, it is contemplated more than before and brings forth considerable changes in life and attitude. Sy and Cote conducted a study that proved emotionally intelligent are more competent and perform better. Therefore, many companies are using "EI training programs" to increase matrix performance.

=== Disorders ===
There are a few disorders that show deficiency in emotional expression and response. These include alexithymia, autism, hypomimia and involuntary expression disorder.

In the context of the extended process model of emotion regulation, difficulties in any of the stages (i.e. identification, selection, implementation and monitoring) can significantly contribute to the development of various disorders, as mentioned earlier. In the identification stage, individuals recognize whether regulation is necessary. For instance, anxiety can arise when individuals overrepresent emotional threats, leading to heightened regulatory efforts, whereas alexithymia is associated with an underrepresentation of emotional states, impairing the ability to recognize emotional needs. The selection stage involves choosing an appropriate regulatory strategy. Failures here may lead to issues such as substance abuse and can occur when individuals value maladaptive strategies or avoidance over healthier techniques. During the implementation stage, people execute these specific tactics. Impairments here, for instance, can result in disorders like generalized anxiety disorder, where tactics that involve worry are excessively used due to their perceived immediate benefit. Difficulties in adjusting or terminating regulatory efforts in the monitoring stage can contribute to disorders like depression or mania, where individuals may switch strategies prematurely. This illustrates how impairments at any stage of emotion regulation can potentially lead to a range of emotional and behavioural disorders.

Alongside of⁣⁣ alexithymia, autism, hypomimia and involuntary expression disorder in which deficits in emotional expressions are primary, other disorders and impairments can effect emotional expression and recognition of emotional expression. Studies show that impairment, such as stroke or damages, to the right parietal lobe, right somatosensory cortex, and cerebellum can impair recognition of facial emotional expressions and can impair visual representation of emotional expressions. Patients with Alzheimer's, Parkinson's disease, and Huntington's disease, and individuals with traumatic brain injuries and temporal lobe epilepsy, also demonstrate distorted facial emotional expression. It's worth noting that these impairments do not influence experiencing affect, but distorted recognition of emotional expressions also impair one's own emotional expressions.

Other findings on how different disorders can interact with emotional expression change demonstrate disorders such as schizophrenia and antisocial personality disorders can cause impaired emotional expression and recognition of emotional expression. Both schizophrenia and antisocial personality disorder have similar effects on emotional expression in patients diagnosed with these disorders. For both disorders, patients experience symptoms such as reduced ability to perceive and express emotions and high sensitivity to emotional expressions of negative emotions such as fear and anger. For patients diagnosed with antisocial personality disorder, the sensitivity towards expression of anger is significantly higher than those in the control groups. For patients diagnosed with schizophrenia, loss of emotional facial expressions is one of the main negative symptoms.

== Emotional differences across cultures ==
Despite the common conversation over whether emotions are universal or not, research on emotional expression cross-culturally has displayed that emotions aren't expressed exactly the same across cultures. When investigating the types of emotions experienced, there are two kinds known as socially engaging emotions and socially disengaging emotions. Socially engaging emotions refer to emotions that generate closeness, relationships and connection to other people such as friendliness while socially disengaging emotions generate autonomy, independence and disconnection from others such as anger or frustration. Comparing research on Japanese culture with American culture, it was found that Japanese culture utilizes socially engaging emotions more than disengaging ones while American culture utilizes socially disengaging emotions more than engaging ones.

Differences in emotion regulation are also present. In Western cultures, it is very typical to want to maintain and exaggerate feelings of happiness and joy when they are experienced. This often stems from the idea that negative emotions must be avoided while striving for only positive feelings which is widely believed in Western cultures. This differs from Eastern cultures that tend to see the good and bad to positive emotions while not exaggerating positive emotions when experienced. In Eastern cultures, it is recognized that emotions are temporary and that feelings of good and bad can occur at the same time.

Gay partners have higher levels of expressiveness than heterosexual partners.

=== Cross-cultural developmental differences ===
Additionally to social scripts on which emotions are more valued cross-culturally, the development of emotional expressions reflects the preference for socially engaging and disengaging emotions, and the preference for more positive or balanced emotions that differed across Western and Eastern cultures. Studies conducted with Thai and American mothers revealed that children learn how to express emotions in a way that is appropriate for their cultures from their primary caregivers. There is evidence that the intensity of emotional expressions, the channels through which they are expressed (e.g., behavioural, verbal, etc.), and the emotions expressed by parents all play a role in how infants form culturally appropriate emotional expressions.

Media displays of emotions during developmental stages also differ for cultures. American storybooks for children display more powerful and assertive negative emotions (eg. anger) while avoiding the negative emotions that are more powerless and less assertive (eg. sadness); Turkish and Romanian storybooks for children did not show the same enhancement of portraying powerful negative emotions and avoidance of portraying powerless negative emotions. Similar differences in expressions of emotions are also found in Russian and American children's stories. American parents tend to tell stories that have less negative emotions than Russian parents. American children's books contain a lower degree of negative emotions compared to Russian children's books.

The intensity of emotional interaction was found to be higher in American mothers compared to the intensity of behavioural emotional interaction in Thai mothers. These findings also relate to another study suggesting individuals from East-Asian cultures tend to downplay their emotional expressions and demonstrate less intense behavioural expressions of emotions compared to American cultures. This does, however, present a limitation in terms of research on cultural differences in emotions and emotional expressions. Individuals from interdependent cultures report experiencing more positive and intense emotions in social settings, whereas individuals from independent cultures report experiencing more positive and intense emotions when thinking about themselves. Considering these findings, a laboratory environment may not be the best context for people from interdependent cultures to experience emotions, since they lack their social environment (e.g., friends and family).

In addition, findings indicated that caregivers from individualistic cultures (American) experienced and interacted with their emotions through their behaviours, and caregivers from collectivist cultures (Thai) expressed and experienced their emotions verbally. Additionally, emotions that are expressed vary across cultures. While American mothers used more positive words when expressing emotions, Thai mothers were found to express more negative words than positive words. These findings support the cultural difference in emotional expressions, where independent cultures tend to express more socially disengaging emotions (that emphasize autonomy and independence), and interdependent cultures tend to express more socially engaging emotions (that emphasize closeness and relationships).

== Effects ==
Expressing emotions can have important effects on individuals' well-being and relationships with others, depending on how and with whom the emotions are shared. Emotions convey information about our needs, where negative emotions can signal that a need has not been met and positive emotions signal that it has been meet. In some contexts, conveying this information can have a negative impact on an individual; for example, when others ignore or exploit those needs.

Researchers note that there a number of important benefits to expressing emotions selectively. In the case of distress, expression can help people take control of their emotions and facilitate "mean-making" to help them reappraise their situation. For instance, emotional expression through writing can help people better understand their feelings, and subsequently regulate their emotions or adjust their actions. In research by James W. Pennebaker, people who observed a traumatic death showed more improvements in physical health and subjective well-being after writing about their emotions over several days. This research also shows that these benefits only appear when individuals undergo a cognitive change, such as in gaining insight about their experience.

Emotional expression has social implications as well. Since emotions are related to our needs, it is important that they are expressed to others who care about our needs. Expression to someone with whom there is no desire to form a relationship is likely to receive no response. Individuals who express negative emotions, in particular, may also appear less likeable as a result. However, when an individual expresses to someone who responds with empathy, their relationship with that person can improve. Like with writing, hearing another person's perspective can help people reappraise the situation that incited those emotions. Additionally, emotional expression to someone else can be viewed as a form of disclosure and sign of trust with that person, thus promoting intimacy. For example, greater expression of emotions or willingness to express negative emotions, such as anxiety or fear, promotes the formation of more relationships, greater intimacy in those relationships, and more support from others.

There is evidence that when individuals experience crises and trauma, emotional expression is the coping mechanism that leads to better mental health following the event. This process requires accepting and engaging with the emotional experience in order to reflect on and make sense of them. This can then lead to increases in emotional tolerance, altruism, resilience, psychological flexibility, and community engagement. Furthermore, this process is most effective with done collectively. This research highlights the inherent adaptiveness of these emotional experiences, and the importance of engaging with them.

== See also ==
- Affect display
- Affective science
- Blob Tree
- Contrasting and categorization of emotions
- Coping
- Emotional intelligence
- Emotions and culture
- Gender and emotional expression
- Hypomimia
- Sex and emotion
