= Christopher Long =

Christopher Long may refer to:

- Christopher P. Long, American academic and Dean of the College of Arts and Letters at Michigan State University
- Christopher Long, an amateur geologist who discovered the White Scar Caves in 1923
- Christopher William Long (1938–2023), British diplomat
- Christopher Long (director), American film director, actor, producer and screenwriter
- Christopher Long (bicyclist), Critical Mass bicyclist involved in a controversial 2008 dispute with the NYPD
- Chris Long (priest) (born 1947), Archdeacon of Ferns and Archdeacon of Cashel, Waterford and Lismore
- Chris Long (footballer) (born 1995), English footballer for Crewe Alexandra

== See also ==
- Chris Long (disambiguation)
