= Henry Long =

Henry Long may refer to:

- Henry Long (died 1490) (c. 1417–1490), English landowner and Member of Parliament, of Draycot, Wiltshire
- Henry Long (died 1556) (c. 1489–1556), English landowner and Member of Parliament, of Draycot, Wiltshire
- Henry Long (died 1573) (1544–1573), English landowner and Member of Parliament for Cambridgeshire
- Henry Long (footballer) (1914–1989), English footballer
- Henry M. Long (1836–1909), politician and businessman in Pennsylvania
- Henry Long (speedway rider) (1927–2019), South African speedway rider

== Others ==
- Henry Longs (died 2021), Nigerian politician

== See also ==
- Harry Long (disambiguation)
