= The Oregon Desert =

1964 book by E. R. Jackman and R. A. Long

- The Oregon Desert front cover
- Author: E. R. Jackman and R. A. Long
- Language: English
- Subject: South-central Oregon
- Genre: History and natural history
- Published: 1964 (Caxton Press)
- Publication place: United States
- Media type: Printed book
- Pages: 407
- ISBN: 978-0870044342
- LC Class: 64-15389

The Oregon Desert is a non-fiction book about the high desert region of eastern Oregon. It highlights both the people and natural history of Oregon's high desert country using serious science, first-hand narrative history, and humorous anecdotal stories. It was written by E. R. Jackman and R. A. Long. The book was first published in 1964 and has never been out of print since its initial release.

== Authors ==
Edwin Russell (E.R.) Jackman was an American agricultural expert from Oregon. He worked for Oregon State University as a rural extension agent and a farm crop specialist from 1929 until 1959. In this capacity, he advised local farmers and ranchers on modern agricultural techniques, land use, and conservation practices. His professional papers and photograph collection are in the Oregon State University archives. This includes his original notes, publication draft, and correspondence related to The Oregon Desert book.

R. A. (Reub) Long was a rancher and local historian from Fort Rock in south-central Oregon. He was widely known as a cowboy philosopher and witty story teller. He was also a long-time member of Oregon's State Board of Agriculture and donated property to the State of Oregon to create Fort Rock State Natural Area. A generation after his death, Long is still one of Oregon's best-known story tellers. This is due in part to the success of The Oregon Desert.

Jackman and Long began working together on conservation projects in the 1940s. This was the beginning of a lifelong friendship. In 1964, the two men got together to write The Oregon Desert, a book about the natural history and people of Oregon's high desert. According to the Caxton Press, "Reub Long is a cowboy who thinks like a scientist and E. R. Jackman is a scientist who thinks like a cowboy. Together they produced a book about a unique region of the American West and its inhabitants, filled with history, lore, and humor."

== Synopsis ==
The Oregon Desert highlights the people, places, plants, and animals of Oregon's high desert. Jackman contributed scholarly chapters on geology, geography, flora, fauna, and the life of Native Americans in the high desert. Long added first-hand narratives about his life on the high desert using humorous anecdotal stories. According to Oregon Public Broadcasting, the book "successfully blended natural science with cowboy humor and scholarly prose with casual meanderings. It is a celebration of rural Western storytelling."

== Chapters ==
The Oregon Desert has 407 pages with 118 photographs and illustrations. The book is divided into 23 chapters with nine short appendices along with the Index at the end.

- Chapter 1, "The Unshorn Fields" by E. R. Jackman, describes Oregon's high desert and introduces Reub Long to readers.
- Chapter 2, “Boy on a Horse on the Desert" by R. A. Long, is about Long's boyhood experiences in the Fort Rock Valley.
- Chapter 3, "Those with the Least Stayed the Longest" by R. A. Long, includes anecdotes about homesteaders in Oregon's high desert.
- Chapter 4, "Uncle Sam Is Rich Enough To Give Us All a Farm" by E. R. Jackman, discusses the hard life faced by homesteaders on the high desert.
- Chapter 5, "From Eohippus to Palomino" by E. R. Jackman, is about horses in Oregon.
- Chapter 6, "My Saddle's My Home" by R. A. Long, is about Long's experiences with wild horses.
- Chapter 7, "Go Slow and Get There Quicker" by R. A. Long, is about cowboy life.
- Chapter 8, "Bronc Rides on the High Desert" by R. A. Long, includes a number of anecdotal stories about horsemanship.
- Chapter 9, "All in a Day's Work" by R. A Long, has more anecdotal stories and tall tales.
- Chapter 10, "The High Desert Was Kind to Sheep" by R. A. Long, has anecdotal stories about Irish and Basque sheepherders.
- Chapter 11, "Indians in the Desert" by E. R. Jackman, is about Native American life in Oregon's high desert.
- Chapter 12, "The Coyote" by E. R. Jackman, is a wide-ranging discourse on coyotes.
- Chapter 13, "The Little Folk of the Desert" by E. R. Jackman, is about small desert mammals.
- Chapter 14, "Badgers, and Skunks Are Nice People" by E. R. Jackman, is about some of the larger desert animals.
- Chapter 15, "Mule Deer" by E. R. Jackman, is a humorous look at hunters.
- Chapter 16, "How To Get Along" by R. A Long, include humorous stories about Long's experiences cattle ranching, herding sheep, trapping, driving freight wagons, and dude wrangling.
- Chapter 17, "Every Day Is an Adventure", by R. A. Long, has anecdotal stories about Long's experience freighting, trapping, and wrangling horses for movie production companies.
- Chapter 18, "The Desert-Wise Plants" by E. R. Jackman, is about desert plants.
- Chapter 19, "Grass Grows by Inches—It is Destroyed by Feet" by E. R. Jackman, is about desert ecology and range management.
- Chapter 20, "The Desert Towns" by E. R. Jackman and R. A. Long, discusses the numerous small towns that were built to support homesteaders in the early 20th century.
- Chapter 21, "Water on the Desert" by R. A. Long, uses anecdotal stories to highlight the importance of water on the high desert.
- Chapter 22, "Things To See on the Desert" by E. R. Jackman and R. A. Long, identifies some of the geological highlights of Oregon's high desert country.
- Chapter 23, "A-Horseback and Alone" by R. A. Long, offers Long's witty insights and observations on numerous subjects, distilled from a lifetime on the high desert.

Jackman was the book's primary writer. Long was a story teller so the chapters attributed to him were dictated to Jackman, who then prepared the entire volume for publication.

The book's appendices are very eclectic. They provide additional information on Spanish words used in the text, Oregon's horse population over time, the area where Reub Long caught wild horses, horse buyer's jargon, cattle brands, how the word "coyote" is used, Oregon's basic life zones, bobcat food, and high desert ghost towns.

== Reviews ==
From its first release in 1964, The Oregon Desert has received excellent reviews from numerous sources. On 7 October 1964, the Eugene Register-Guard newspaper said:

This is the finest book written about our region in many years. It should be in every library in the Northwest and makes an especially fine gift.

To commemorate Oregon's sesquicentennial in 2009, the Oregon State Library recommended 150 Oregon-related books including The Oregon Desert. According to the Oregon State Library, this book is "a classic account of the places, events, animals and people in the High Desert region."

In highlighting The Oregon Desert in its section on Oregon authors and books, the Oregon Blue Book quoted from Google Books as follows:

Wild horses run through this book. All of the desert animals shyly peek out from its pages. Desert towns spring to life before your eyes and swiftly decay. Stories of life on the desert are told with deep subtle humor, wisdom, and charm, producing a delightful book.

== Publication ==
The Oregon Desert is published by Caxton Press of Caldwell, Idaho. The book was first published in 1964. The book has never been out of print since its first edition in 1964. As of 2003, the book is in its fourteenth printing. Here are the publication dates for each printing from 1964 to the current edition which was published in 2003.

- First printing, May 1964
- Second printing, June 1964
- Third printing, August 1964
- Fourth printing, January 1965
- Fifth printing, July 1965
- Sixth printing, July 1966
- Seventh printing, October 1967
- Eighth printing, November 1969
- Ninth printing, October 1971
- Tenth printing, September 1973
- Eleventh printing, September 1977
- Twelfth printing, October 1982
- Thirteenth printing, February 1992
- Fourteenth printing, May 2003

The University of Nebraska Press distributes the 2003 edition for the Caxton Press.
