= Christopher P. Long =

American philosopher

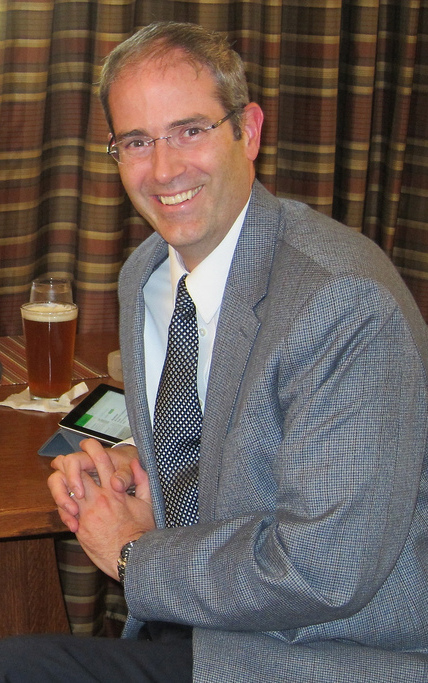
- Born: May 28, 1969 (age 57); Philadelphia, PA

Education
- Education: The New School for Social Research (MA, PhD), Wittenberg University (BA)

Philosophical work
- Era: 21st-century philosophy
- Region: Western philosophy
- Institutions: The University of Oregon, Michigan State University, Pennsylvania State University
- Main interests: ancient Greek and contemporary continental philosophy
- Website: https://cplong.org/

Christopher P. Long is an American academic, Professor of Philosophy and current Provost and Senior Vice President at the University of Oregon. Prior to taking on this role, he was Dean of the College of Arts & Letters and the Honors College and MSU Foundation Professor at Michigan State University. He is the author of four monographs, the co-founder of the Mellon-funded Public Philosophy Journal, a primary investigator on the Mellon-funded HumetricsHSS grant, and an advocate for open access.

== Career and scholarship ==
Long was educated at Germantown Friends School, in Philadelphia, Ohio's Wittenberg University, before going on to complete his graduate studies at The New School for Social Research in New York, where he received his PhD in 1998. He held an Assistant Professorship at Richard Stockton College for five years, before joining the faculty at Pennsylvania State University in 2004. He went on to serve as Director of Graduate Studies for the philosophy department at Penn State, before being appointed Associate Dean for Undergraduate and Graduate Education. In 2015, he was appointed Dean of the College of Arts & Letters at Michigan State University.

Long has written on both ancient Greek and contemporary continental philosophy. In addition to numerous articles and book chapters, he has published three monographs, two of which were with Cambridge University Press: The Ethics of Ontology: Rethinking an Aristotelian Legacy (SUNY 2004), Aristotle On the Nature of Truth (Cambridge 2010), Socratic and Platonic Political Philosophy: Practicing a Politics of Reading (Cambridge 2014), and Reiner Schürmann and the Poetics of Politics (Punctum Books, 2018).

Long is co-founder of the Public Philosophy Journal, a project that has received over $780,000 in funding from the Mellon Foundation. He is also a primary investigator for the Mellon funded Humane Metrics for the Humanities and Social Sciences initiative.

== Advocacy ==
Long is an advocate of public scholarship, open access, and digital approaches to scholarship and pedagogy. In addition to his Digital Dialogue and Liberal Arts Endeavor podcasts, he has frequently written about the benefits of using social media to enable education, scholarship, and collaboration.
