= Max Long =

Max Long is the name of:

- Max Freedom Long (1890–1971), American teacher and philosopher
- Maxie Long (1878–1959), American athlete and Olympic medalist

In computer science, the term max long may also refer to the maximum value that can be represented by a long integer data type.
