= Henry M. Long =

American politician

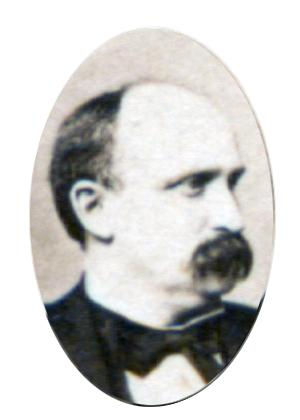
circa 1875–1880

Henry Martyn Long (October 28, 1836 in Pittsburgh – December 24, 1909) was a politician and businessman in Allegheny County, Pennsylvania. He served several terms in the Pennsylvania House of Representatives, including time as speaker.
