= Terry Long =

Terry Long may refer to:

- Terry Long (footballer) (1934–2021), English footballer
- Terry Long (American football) (1959–2005), American football player
- Terry Long (white supremacist) (born 1946), Canadian white supremacist
- Terry Long, a character from DC Comics' Teen Titans

== See also ==
- Terrence Long (born 1976), American baseball player
