= Samuel Long =

Samuel Long or Sam Long may refer to:

- Samuel Long (MP) (1746–1807), British politician
- Samuel Long (Jamaican politician) (fl. 1671–1673), Jamaican politician
- Sam Long (baseball) (born 1995), American baseball pitcher
- Sam Long (footballer, born 1995), English football defender
- Sam Long (footballer, born 2002), Scottish football goalkeeper
