= John V. Long =

Politician and religious leader in Utah Territory

John Varah Long (28 September 1826 in Wickersley, England – 14 April 1869) was a clerk for Brigham Young, the first governor of Utah Territory and the second president of the Church of Jesus Christ of Latter-day Saints (also known as LDS Church). In 1860, Long was elected to the first of five terms he would serve in the House of Representatives of the Utah territorial legislature.

On November 1, 2007, KTVX, a Salt Lake City television station, announced that a number of his diaries and letters related to his position had surfaced. These records appear likely to reveal a great amount of additional historical perspective and detail with regard to both the views and doings of Young, as well as added insight into the early operations of various aspects of the LDS Church.
