= Ben Long =

Ben Long may refer to:

- Ben Long (American painter) (born 1945)
- Ben Long (British artist) (born 1978), English contemporary visual artist
- Ben Long (footballer) (born 1997), Australian rules footballer playing for the St Kilda Football Club
- Benjamin Long (1838–1877), Swiss-born mayor of Dallas in 1868–1870 and 1872–1874

== See also ==
- Benjamin Longue (born 1980), New Caledonian footballer
- Ben Leong (born 1986), Malaysian professional golfer
