= Michael Long =

Michael Long is the name of:

== Government ==
- Michael Long (judge) (1928–1985), British judge
- Michael R. Long (1940–2022), American politician, former chairperson of the Conservative Party of New York State
- Mike Long (lobbyist) (fl. 2000s), American lobbyist and political strategist in Pennsylvania
- Michael Long (Northern Ireland politician) (Michael Andrew Long, fl. from 2014)

== Sports ==
- Mike Long (American football) (Michael Stanford Long, born 1938)
- Michael E. Long (born 1946), American basketball coach and former basketball player
- Michael Long (footballer) (born 1969), Australian rules footballer
- Michael Long (golfer) (Michael Richard Long, born 1968), New Zealand golfer

== Other people ==
- Michael Long (actor) (Michael Merrick Long, 1947– 1991), Australian actor
- Michael Long (linguist) (Michael Hugh Long, 1945–2021), American psycholinguist
- Mike Long (born 1974), Magic: The Gathering card game player
- Mike Long (American businessman) (born c. 1953), former CEO of Continuum, WebMD, and Homestore.com
- Mike Long (author) (Michael Long, fl. from 2001), American author
- Michael G. Long (fl. from 2000), American academic in religious studies and peace & conflict studies

== Fictional characters ==
- Michael Knight (Knight Rider), first appearing as Michael Long
