= Steven Long (disambiguation) =

Steven Long (1944–2022) was an American writer.

Steven Long may also refer to:

- Steve Long (died 1868), American western lawman and outlaw
- Steve Long (soccer) (born 1957), retired Zaire/U.S. soccer player
- Steven S. Long, role-playing game author
- Steven Wayne Long (born 1994), member of the South Carolina House of Representatives

== See also ==
- Stephen Long (disambiguation)
