= William Long (MP for Barnstaple, 1388) =

English politician

William Long was an English politician. He sat as MP for Barnstaple in February 1388.
