= Earl Long (disambiguation) =

Earl Long (1895–1960) was an American politician, Governor of Louisiana.

Earl Long may also refer to:

- E. V. Long (Earl Van Meter Long, 1885–1941), American college football coach
- Earl C. Long (1883–1983), United States Marine Corps general
