= Ed Long =

Ed Long may refer to:

- Ed Long (aviator) (1915–1999), American pilot who holds the Guinness World Record for most flight hours at 65,000
- Ed Long (audio engineer) (1932–2016), American inventor
- Ed Long (cricketer) (1883–1947), Australian cricket player
- Ed Long (politician) (1934–2017), American businessman and politician

== See also ==
- Edward Long (disambiguation)
- Edwin Long (1829–1891), English painter
