= Bobby Long (child actor) =

American child actor (1932–2005)

- Born: Bobby Earl Logsdon; March 27, 1932; St. Louis, Missouri
- Died: October 31, 2005 (aged 73); Orange, California
- Occupation: Child actor
- Notable work: It Happened in Brooklyn
- Parents: Hubert Earl; Lola Mae Logsdon
- Relatives: Mattie Logsdon (grandmother)

Bobby Long (born Bobby Earl Logsdon, March 27, 1932 - October 31, 2005) was an American child actor, most known for his role as high school student Johnny O'Brien in the 1947 musical It Happened in Brooklyn, performing the Jule Styne Sammy Cahn song "I Believe" alongside Frank Sinatra and Jimmy Durante.

== Early life ==
Bobby Long was born Bobby Earl Logsdon on March 27, 1932, in St. Louis, Missouri to Hubert Earl and Lola Mae Logsdon. He began tap dancing at an early age, first appearing on the Major Bowes Show. He then toured around the United States as a vaudeville act from the age of 9. He grew up in Santa Monica, California. One of Long's performances at the Majestic Theatre in Paterson, New Jersey was reviewed in The Paterson Morning Call:

"If nine-year-old (sic) Bobby Long... continues his amazing tap dancing career, he will probably be the greatest tap dancer to ever appear before the footlights. This can be attested for at the Majestic, where the youngster is exhibiting one of the greatest demonstrations of timing ever to be presented by a juvenile tapper... His dancing ability will definitely assure him big time success."

== Career ==
By the age of 14, Bobby Long was given a contract for $200 a week.

In 1943, Long was featured in a soundie entitled Club Lollypop, dancing alongside Marlene Cameron. Long was then cast in the 1947 Metro Goldwyn Mayer musical It Happened in Brooklyn. He played a young high school student named Johnny O'Brien, tap dancing and singing "I Believe" alongside Frank Sinatra and Jimmy Durante. This was his first and only role in a feature film. Long continued touring for a few months after the film's release, but by the end of 1947 had stopped performing altogether for reasons that are unclear. Between 1951 and 1955, Long served in the United States Navy aboard the USS Philippine Sea during the Korean War.

In 1976, the tap-dancing sequence from It Happened in Brooklyn was featured in the movie That's Entertainment, Part II.

== Death ==
He died on October 31, 2005, in Orange, California.
