= Theodore Long (disambiguation) =

Theodore Long may refer to:

- Theodore Long (born 1947), American former professional wrestler, referee and manager
- Theodore E. Long American former president of Elizabethtown College, Pennsylvania

== See also ==
- Ted Long (disambiguation)
