= Chris Long (disambiguation) =

Chris Long (born 1985) is an American football defensive end.

Chris Long may also refer to:

- Chris Long (basketball) (born 1968), American college basketball coach
- Chris Long (businessman), co-founder of the Kansas City Current
- Chris Long (director), director of Weeds and Smallville
- Chris Long (footballer) (born 1995), association football player

== See also ==
- Christopher Long (disambiguation)
- Kristin Long, ballerina
