= Virginia and Naomi Leong =

Australian immigration detainees

Virginia and Naomi Leong are a mother and daughter who were held within the Villawood Immigration Detention Centre, Australia, from 2001 until 2005. After escalating media attention on the declining mental health of Naomi Leong, both Virginia and Naomi were released on a bridging visa on 23 May 2005.

== Lives in detention ==
Virginia Leong, a Malaysian citizen, was two months pregnant when she was arrested and placed under mandatory detention in 2001 for attempting to leave Australia without correct papers. Her daughter, born within the detention centre, was not automatically granted Australian citizenship and, at the time of her release, remained stateless.

At the time of her release, Naomi Leong was three years old and had lived her entire life within the detention system. Over this period she allegedly became mentally disturbed, exhibiting various signs including bruises from banging her head against walls. She was also purported to suffer from severe separation anxiety.

From March till May 2005, psychiatrist Michael Dudley orchestrated a campaign to allow Naomi to visit a local playgroup for three hours a week, for the sake of her mental health. Dudley argued "She's been brought up in prison, in a highly abnormal environment with highly distressed people. It's not an environment conducive to child development."

The Department of Immigration and Multicultural and Indigenous Affairs granted this request, allowing Naomi Leong three hours of association with others her own age once a week.

Dudley's report was also used as part of a growing media campaign to highlight problems that a number of groups saw with Australia's hard-line detention policy. Just prior to the release of the pair, the Malaysian media also began to report the story locally. According to former opposition leader Kim Beazley, this embarrassed the Howard government into acting.

== Lives after release ==
Shortly after her release, Virginia Leong was provided access to Australia's Medicare scheme, and the right to work (Class A visa). Naomi Leong was not granted access to Medicare and remained on a Class E visa.

In addition, Virginia Leong is now required to pay approximately A$500,000 to the Australian Government as repayment of the costs incurred by the government to hold her in detention.
