= Hugh Long =

Hugh Long may refer to:

- Hugh Long (politician), Democrat member of the Wisconsin State Assembly in the year 1848
- Hugh Long (footballer) (1923–1988), Scottish footballer

== See also ==
- Huey Long (1893–1935), American politician, governor of Louisiana
