= Howard Rusk Long =

American journalist and author

- Born: July 30, 1906; Columbia, Missouri
- Died: August 30, 1988 (aged 82)
- Occupations: Journalist, writer

Howard Rusk Long (July 30, 1906 – August 30, 1988) was born in Columbia, Missouri, and was an American journalist and writer. Long graduated from the University of Missouri in 1930 with a Bachelor of Journalism. After earning his undergraduate degree, he worked with multiple newspapers in West Virginia, Arkansas, and Missouri. He obtained his master's degree in 1941 and later earned a doctorate from the University of Missouri. Long taught at the University of Missouri from 1940 to 1950, while he also served as the manager of the Missouri Press Association. After an unsuccessful political campaign, Long worked at Southern Illinois University as director of the School of Journalism from 1953 to 1972. During this time, Long also taught in Taipei and traveled to several other countries. Throughout his career, Long participated in multiple societies for newspaper editors, including co-founding the International Society of Weekly Newspaper Editors (ISWNE) in 1955. In his personal life, Long married Margaret Carney in 1931. He also belonged to Kiwanis, the Masonic lodge, and the Protestant Church.

== Early life ==
Howard Rusk Long was born in 1906 in Columbia, Missouri. His parents were C. M. Long and Carrie B. Long, and he was one of three children. Long's father was a well-known farmer in Rochester, Indiana. In 1925, the Long family moved to Lafayette, Indiana. Long graduated with a Bachelor of Journalism in 1930 from the University of Missouri. He married Margaret Carney in 1931. He graduated with his master's in 1941. Long later earned a doctorate from the University of Missouri in rural sociology.

== Career ==
After graduating with his bachelor's degree, Long worked with newspapers in West Virginia and Arkansas. Long worked as the manager of the Nicholas Republican in Richwood, West Virginia. He also worked as a manager for Milkmen's Service Inc. in Lafayette. In 1934, Long went to Fort Smith, Arkansas to work for the Southwest Times Record. That same year, his father-in-law, George D. Carney, bought the Crane Chronicle in Missouri. Long was the manager of the Chronicle for six years, until he sold it in 1940. In 1937, he was the president of Ozark Press Association.

In 1940, Long joined the faculty at the University of Missouri and also began working at the Missouri Press Association. He was the manager of the Missouri Press Association from 1941 to 1946 and 1947 to 1949. He taught journalism at the University of Missouri until 1950 when he left to work on his 1,200-acre farm in Rochester, Indiana. During this time, however, Long was given an assignment from the British Ministry of Information. He was one of the first Americans invited to London after V.E. Day.

Long ran unsuccessfully as a Democrat for Joint State Representative for Fulton and Pulaski counties in 1952. He was appointed director of the School of Journalism at Southern Illinois University (SIU) in Carbondale from 1953 to 1972. He designed a building for the School of Journalism that was finished in 1971. Long stepped down as director of the SIU School of Journalism in 1972, but continued working at the university for two more years.

During his time teaching at SIU, a former student, J. T. Shieh, arranged for Long to travel to Taipei through a Smith-Mundt Grant that was given to him in 1956. He taught at the National Chengchi University in Taipei. Long also conducted a study of the Mushan people there. His observations later resulted in his book The people of Mushan: life in a Taiwanese village. Long remained in the country from 1956 to 1957. He also helped edit local English newspapers. While there, he interviewed Chiang Kai-shek and other Nationalist leaders. Upon leaving Taipei, Long traveled to various locations around the world including Hong Kong, Thailand, India, and Paris.

During his life, Long organized conferences for the International Society of Newspaper Editors. He was the editor for their publication, Grassroots from 1960 to 1972. Long was a co-founder of the International Society of Weekly Newspaper Editors (ISWNE) in 1955. There is a scholarship offered by the society in his name. The ISWNE was founded in Carbondale and began with 13 editors as members. In 1964, he became a member of the Board of Advisory Editors of the Trans-Action magazine. He also worked for the Associated Press. He was a consultant to the U.S. Information Agency.

Long was also a member of Kiwanis, the Masonic lodge, and the Protestant Church. Long died in 1988.

== Publications ==
- The Supreme Court and Libel (1981) foreword
- Main Street Militants: an Anthology from Grassroots Editor (1977)
- Frank Luther Mott: Scholar, Teacher, Human Being (1968)
- The First Freedom: New Horizons in Journalism (1968) foreword
- The People of Mushan: life in a Taiwanese Village (1960) with H. R. Pratt Boorman
- Forty Years of Community Service (1955) with L. M. Young
- Recalling the Battle of Britain: a photographic essay based upon the records of the Kent messenger and other contemporary sources of World War II (1940) written with Henry Roy Pratt Boorman
