= Howard Hale Long =

Howard Long (1888–1948) was born in New Ferry, Virginia in 1888 to Thomas and Annie Long. After attending Wayland Academy in Richmond, Virginia he went on to Howard University.

== Education ==
- 1915 B.S. and Bachelor's Diploma in Education from Howard University
- 1916 Master's degree in Experimental Psychology from Clark University
- 1933 Doctor of Education degree in Educational Psychology from Harvard

== Career ==
From 1916–1917 Long began his career at Howard as an instructor before serving as an infantry first lieutenant in World War I. After the war Long went on to be Dean at Pain College in George. In 1923 he then served as Dean of the School of Education at Knoxville College. Proceeding that year, Long became the superintendent of the Washington D.C. public school system. Long served in this position from 1925–1948 when he retired.

While in Washington D.C. Long published a series of research monographs for educational psychology and facilitated many ongoing research projects. According to Jones (1991), after retirement Long went on to serve as Dean of Administration at Central State College in Wilberforce Ohio.

== Publications ==
- Journal of Negro Education
  - "Availability of Special Educational Services to Negroes"
  - "The Relative Learning Capacities of Negroes and Whites"
  - "Improve the Moral of Negro Children and Youth"
  - "Culture and Racial Tension"
  - "Test Result of Third-Grade Negro Children Selected on the Basis of Soci-Economic Status, I"
- Other Publications
  - "An analysis of Some Factors influencing Alpha Scores by States"
  - "On Mental Test and Racial Psychology"

== Membership and Associations ==
- Alpha Phi Alpha fraternity

== Awards and honors ==
- First Graduate of Howard University to earn PhD from Harvard in educational psychology
