= Robert Long (British Army officer) =

British Army officer (1937-2014)

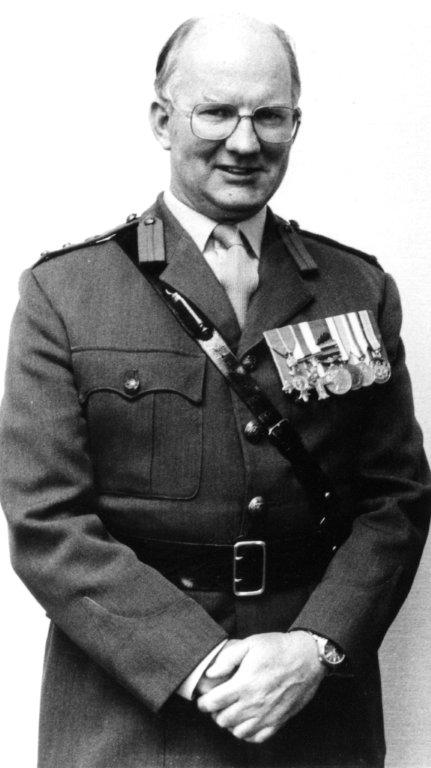
- Bob Long in the uniform of Colonel, The Royal Hampshire Regiment, August 1987.
- Born: 30 January 1937; Alipore, India
- Died: 19 September 2014 (aged 77)
- Military career
- Allegiance: United Kingdom
- Branch: British Army
- Service years: 1956–1989
- Rank: Brigadier
- Nickname: Bob
- Service number: 448172
- Unit: Royal Hampshire Regiment
- Commands: 42nd Brigade
- Conflicts: Cyprus; Indonesia-Malaysia confrontation The Troubles
- Awards: Commander of the Order of the British Empire; Military Cross; Mentioned in Despatches

Brigadier Robert George Long, CBE, MC, DL (30 January 1937 – 19 September 2014) was a British Army officer who was the last Colonel of the Royal Hampshire Regiment.

== Early life ==
Long was born on 30 January 1937 in the military hospital at Alipore, outside Calcutta, India. He was the son of Robert Herbert Long, Adjutant of the 7th Rajput Regiment. During the War, his father was captured while serving in Corps HQ in Malaya, and spent the war as a prisoner of the Japanese. His mother, Margaret (née Culshaw) worked as a cypher clerk with Force 136, the British clandestine organisation in Burma. In 1944, aged seven, Long was despatched back to the UK on board the SS Strathmore, and spent much of his childhood living with relatives in Fareham. He was educated at Sherborne School before taking a National Service Commission, and subsequently went up to Brasenose College, Oxford where he graduated with a Fourth Class Honours degree. During his time at Brasenose, he organised a cricket tour to Corfu in response to a plea from John Forte, the honorary British vice-consul on the island.

== Military career ==
Long was selected for officer training during his National Service and attended the Officer Cadet School at Eaton Hall in Cheshire. He was commissioned into the Royal Hampshire Regiment, and served in Germany. On graduation from Oxford he took up a management trainee position with an oil company, but became disillusioned and applied to rejoin his regiment with a regular commission. 1st Battalion Royal Hampshires were then serving as the West Indies Garrison Battalion, where Long joined them as a platoon commander. His first action came in suppressing riots in Georgetown, British Guiana, and the regiment was also involved in the relief effort following Hurricane Hattie.

He applied for a secondment to the Malaysia Rangers, and served with them in Sarawak Borneo, prior to taking a post at the Royal Military College at Sungai Besi. Shortly after returning to the UK in 1968 the 1st Battalion Royal Hampshires were sent, as part of a United Nations peacekeeping mission, to the Kofinou district of Cyprus, which had been a flashpoint of Greek-Turkish confrontation.

Successfully passing the Command and Staff course at the Staff College led to an appointment as company commander with 1st Battalion the Gloucestershire Regiment, at that time under consideration for merger with the Royal Hampshires. In that role, in late 1972, he was awarded the Military Cross for actions in Northern Ireland, although the detailed citation for the award is still not released to the public. He returned to the Staff College as an administrative officer, before rejoining his own regiment for service in Hong Kong. Promoted Lieutenant-colonel in 1975, a spell in the Ministry of Defence followed, as military assistant to the Quartermaster General, Bill Jackson.

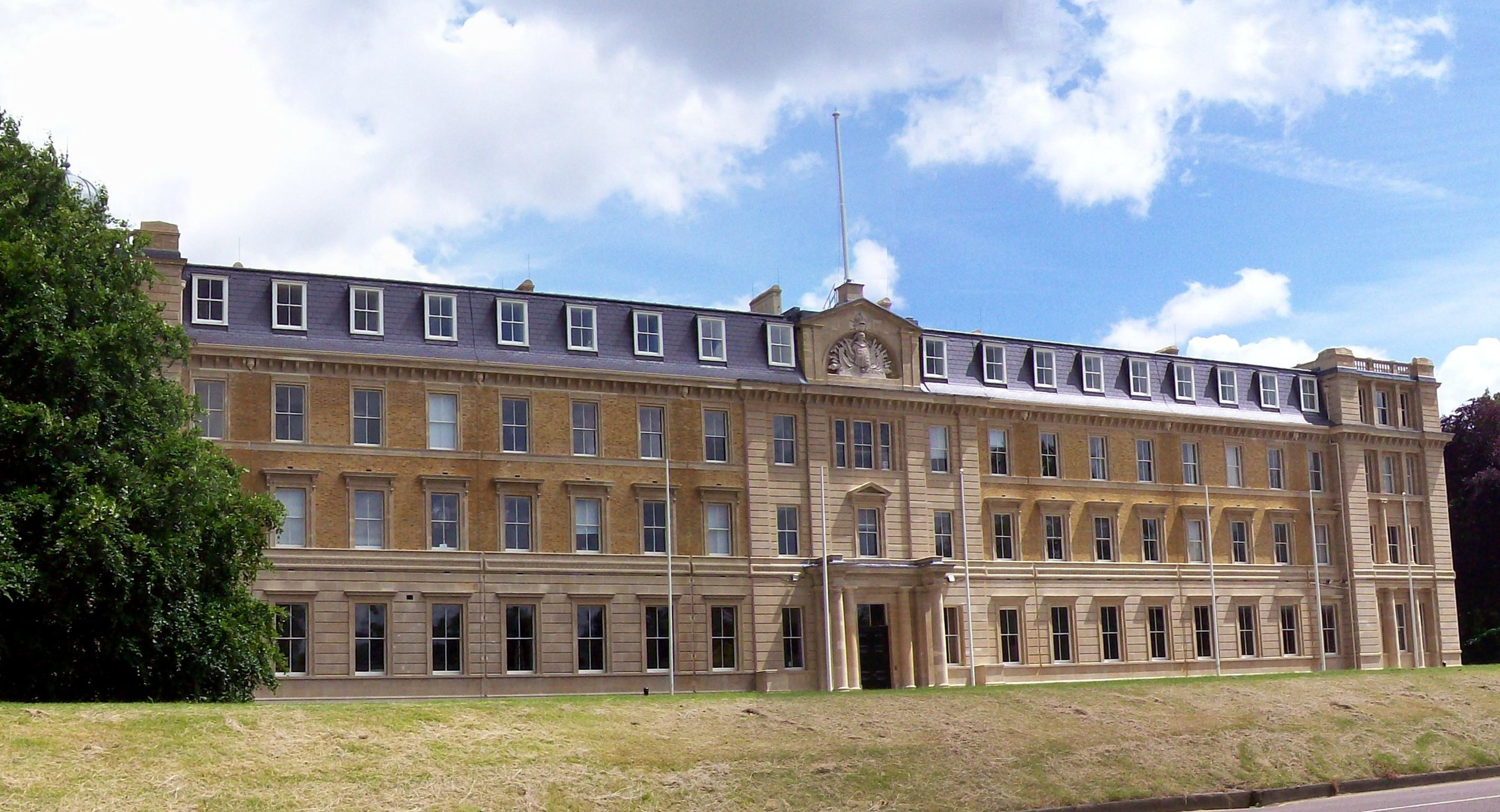
Staff College, Camberley: Long served as a student, an administrator, and on the directing staff

In 1977 he took command of 1st Battalion Royal Hampshires in Ballykelly, and after a successful tour, including the Queen's Jubilee visit in August and considerable efforts to support the RUC, Long was mentioned in dispatches in 1978. On relinquishing command, he moved back to the Ministry of Defence, where he ran the Adjutant General's secretariat. He was appointed an Officer of the Order of the British Empire in 1982. A third visit to the Staff College, as one of three Divisional Colonels, followed.

In 1985 he was promoted brigadier and took command of 42nd Brigade, whose territory stretched from the Welsh to the Scottish border throughout the North West of England, and included two regular battalions and a diverse range of territorial army units. At the end of 1986 Long was appointed to the honorary position of Colonel, The Royal Hampshire Regiment. In this capacity he undertook the difficult challenge of negotiating the demise of his regiment, which was amalgamated with the Queen's Regiment to form The Princess of Wales's Royal Regiment (PWRR) in 1992. Long was instrumental in ensuring that Diana, Princess of Wales, who had been Colonel-in-Chief of the Royal Hampshires, continued in that position in the new regiment named in her honour.

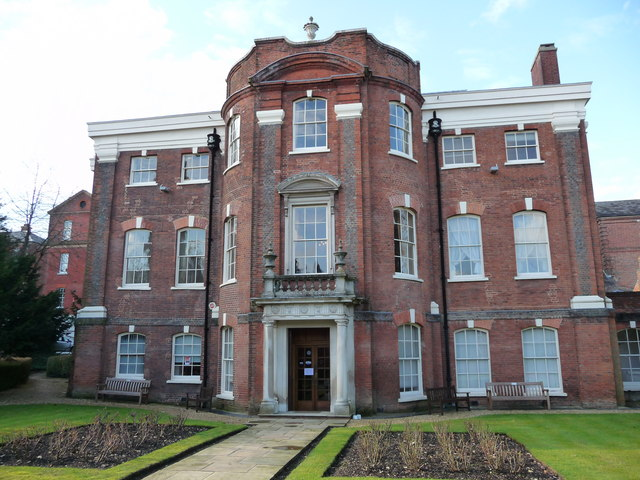
Serle's House, Winchester – former HQ and now museum of the Royal Hampshire Regiment – geograph.org.uk – 1158622

Long was appointed a Commander of the Order of the British Empire in the Birthday Honours list of 1988. His final Army appointment was as the chief of staff in the Directorate of Infantry, from which retired from active service in 1989.

== Later life ==
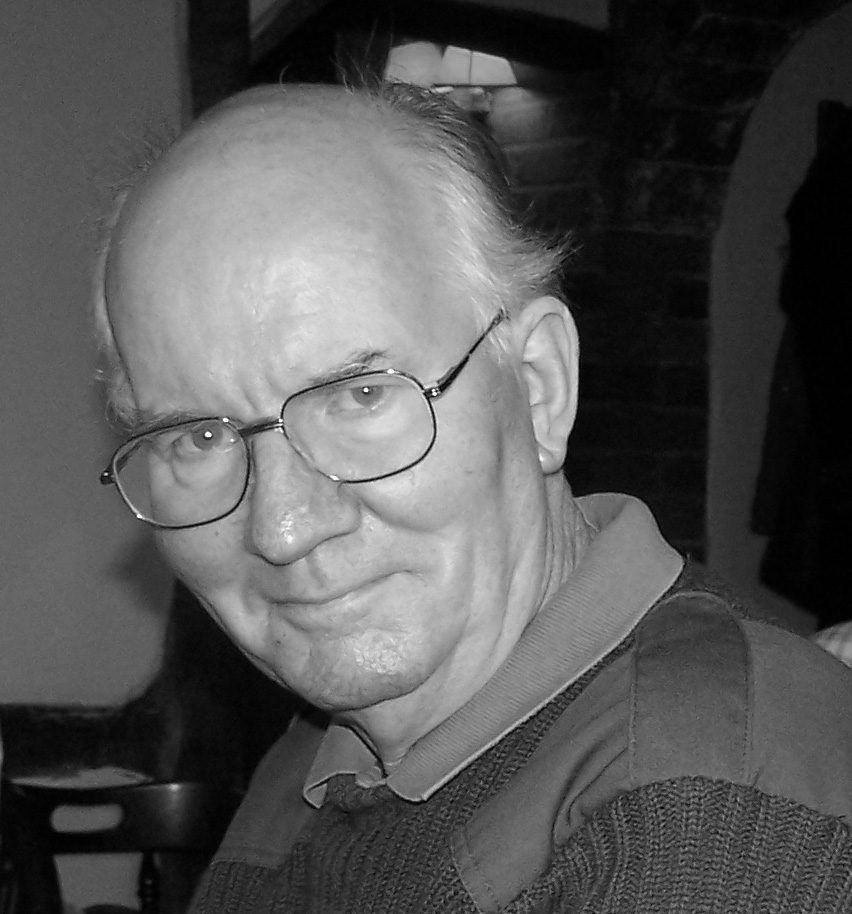
Robert Long at home on 3 February 2007, shortly after his 70th birthday.

Long's experiences in command of the 42nd Brigade had instilled in Bob Long an understanding and enthusiasm for the Territorial Army, and by extension the reserve forces of other services. It was this understanding and enthusiasm that led to his appointment as secretary (i.e. chief executive) of Eastern Wessex TAVRA (Territorial, Auxiliary and Volunteer Reserve Association), the body tasked with oversight and support of reserve forces of all types across central Southern England. He was active in encouraging participation from local employers in the National Employers' Liaison Committee (NELC), a body set up to educate civilian employers on the benefits of encouraging membership of the reserve forces among their employees.

He was commissioned as a Deputy Lieutenant for the county of Hampshire in February 1991.

== Personal life ==
Robert Long married, in 1966, Allison, the daughter of James Francis Firth, a Kenya coffee merchant and liveryman of the Worshipful Company of Ironmongers. They had two daughters and a son. Long was diagnosed with Parkinson's disease in 1998; it was due to complications resulting from Parkinson's that he died in a nursing home near his Over Wallop home, on 19 September 2014. A memorial service was held in Winchester Cathedral on 27 January 2015.

== Honours and decorations ==
Awarded Military Cross (MC) in October 1972 for exemplary gallantry in Northern Ireland
Mentioned in Despatches 21 March 1978 during service in Northern Ireland
Appointed to Officer of the Order of the British Empire (OBE) in the 1982 New Year honours list
Appointed Commander of the Order of the British Empire (CBE) in the 1988 Birthday honours list
Appointed to the Colonelcy of the Royal Hampshire Regiment in January 1987
Appointed Deputy Lieutenant for the County of Hampshire in February 1991
