= Arthur Leonard Long =

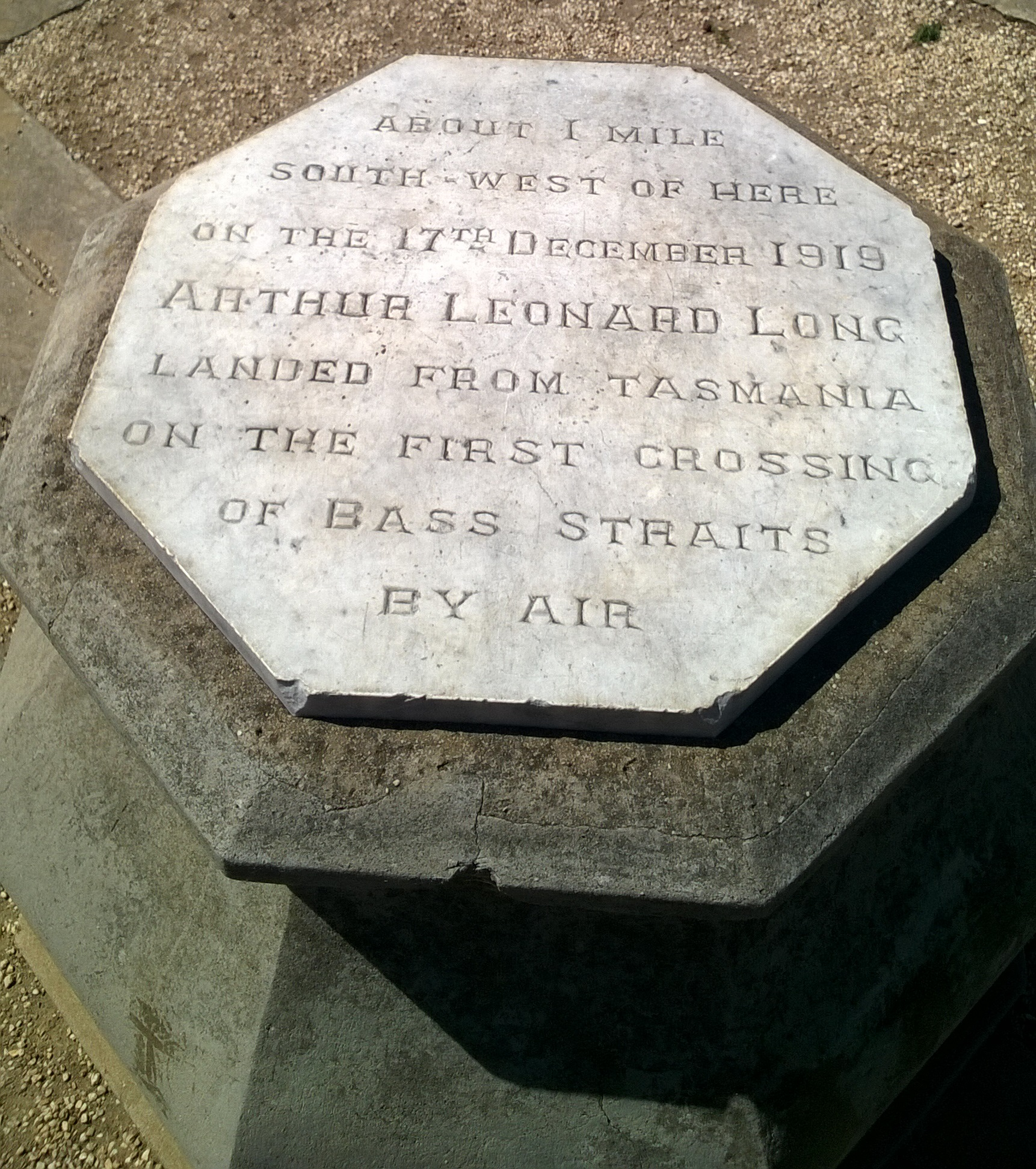
Monument commemorating Long's flight in Torquay, Victoria, erected 1926.

Arthur Leonard Long (1896–1954) was an Australian aviator. He became the first person to cross the Bass Strait by air when he flew his Boulton Paul P.9 biplane from Stanley, Tasmania to Torquay, Victoria on 17 December 1919.

Long was born in Forcett, Tasmania and served as a Lieutenant in the Australian Flying Corps in World War I. He made the Bass Strait crossing a few months after being discharged. A monument was erected by the Royal Historical Society of Victoria in 1926 to commemorate Long's flight.
