= John Dixon Long =

John Dixon Long (September 26, 1817 – 1894) was a minister of the Methodist Episcopal Church and a leading U.S. abolitionist. His 1857 book, Pictures of Slavery in Church and State, was influential in abolitionist circles.

Long was born in New Town, Maryland to John W. Long, a slaveholder and former sea-captain. He credited his mother Sally Laws Henderson Long with inspiring his early antislavery sentiments. A devout member of the Methodist Episcopal Church, she died in 1828. Long's father died in 1834, leaving Long to support two sisters and brother.

Long was received into the Methodist Episcopal Church in 1835 and became a minister in 1839. Health problems forced him to give up his ministerial post in 1848.

In October 1856 Long moved to Philadelphia, Pennsylvania, where he was dismayed by the level of support for slavery, although it was not legal in the commonwealth. This inspired Long to write a treatise on his experience of and views on slavery as it existed in his native state. Pictures of Slavery in Church and State; Including Personal Reminiscences, Biographical Sketches, Anecdotes, Etc. Etc. With an Appendix, Containing the Views of John Wesley and Richard Watson on Slavery was published for $1 (~$34.00 in 2024) in 1857 and was considered a major contribution to the case against slavery by Frederick Douglass and others.

In 1857, Rev. Thomas Quigly, a Methodist minister from Pennsylvania but at the time serving in St. Michaels, Maryland, where Long had served in 1853 through 1855, (and which was the likely context of some of Long's descriptions and examples of slavery), brought charges against Long in the Philadelphia Methodist Episcopal Conference. Long was "tried" at the 1858 Conference Session. Debate about Methodist complacency on the issue of slavery at this conference, however, was skillfully avoided when proposals were made from the floor that the charges against Long be dropped. However, Bonner documents in her article in the Conference journal cited here that Long's book was deemed THE book by the secular press, which did provide debate and commentary on the issue, breaking silence on what was now openly discussed as hypocrisy and cowardice of the Methodist religious hierarchy, given their founders' adamant prescriptions against slavery in the early doctrines of the Methodist Episcopal Church.

John Dixon Long died in Philadelphia in 1894.
