= Arthur Long (British Army officer) =

Brigadier-General Sir Arthur Long KBE CB CMG DSO
- Born: 26 February 1866; Bedfordshire
- Died: 15 November 1941 (aged 75); Kensington
- Military career
- Allegiance: United Kingdom
- Branch: British Army
- Rank: Brigadier-General

Brigadier-General Sir Arthur Long KBE CB CMG DSO (26 February 1866 – 15 November 1941) was Director of Supplies and Transport in the British Army responsible for Macedonia and the Black Sea (1916-1919).

== Career ==
Long was born in Bedfordshire on 26 February 1866, the son of James and Elizabeth Long of Henlow, Bedfordshire. He was educated at Bedford Modern School.

Long joined the British Army in 1887. During World War I Long was mentioned in despatches six times and vested with KBE, CB and CMG. He was promoted to Director of Supplies and Transport for Macedonia and the Black Sea in 1916 and retired from the army in 1919.

In 1893 Long married Maud Eleanor, second daughter of the Rev. Canon James Kelly of Manchester. He died in Kensington on 15 November 1941. He was survived by his wife, a daughter, Mrs Moorhead who was the wife of Brigadier Moorhead, and two sons; Colonel P. J. Long, who was serving in India at the time of his death, and Mr A. L. Long, an engineer who was also based in India.
