= John Long (Australian footballer) =

Australian rules footballer

Personal information
- Full name: John Long
- Born: 12 April 1946 (age 80)
- Original team: Glenelg
- Height: 182 cm (6 ft 0 in)
- Weight: 82 kg (181 lb)

Playing career^{1}
Years	Club	Games (Goals)
1965–66	South Melbourne	7 (4)
- ^{1} Playing statistics correct to the end of 1966.

John Long (born 12 April 1946) is a former Australian rules footballer who played with South Melbourne in the Victorian Football League (VFL).
