= Carl Long (disambiguation) =

Carl Long (born 1967) is an American race car driver.

Carl Long is also the name of:

- Carl Long (baseball) (1935–2015), American professional baseball outfielder
- Luz Long (Carl Ludwig Long, 1913–1943), German Olympic long-jumper
