= David Ryan Long =

American author

David Ryan Long is an American author of two novels. His debut novel Ezekiel's Shadow won the 2002 Christy Award for Best First Fiction. According to WorldCat, the book is held in 541 libraries Quinlin's Estate is his second novel; according to WorldCat, it is in 338 libraries.
