= Doc Long =

Doc Long may refer to:

- William Henry Long (1867-1947), American mycologist and forest pathologist
- George S. Long (1883–1958), U.S. Congressman (1953–1958) and member of the Long political dynasty from Louisiana
- Clarence Long (1908–1994), U.S. Congressman (1963–1985) from Maryland
