= David Long (author) =

American author (born 1948)

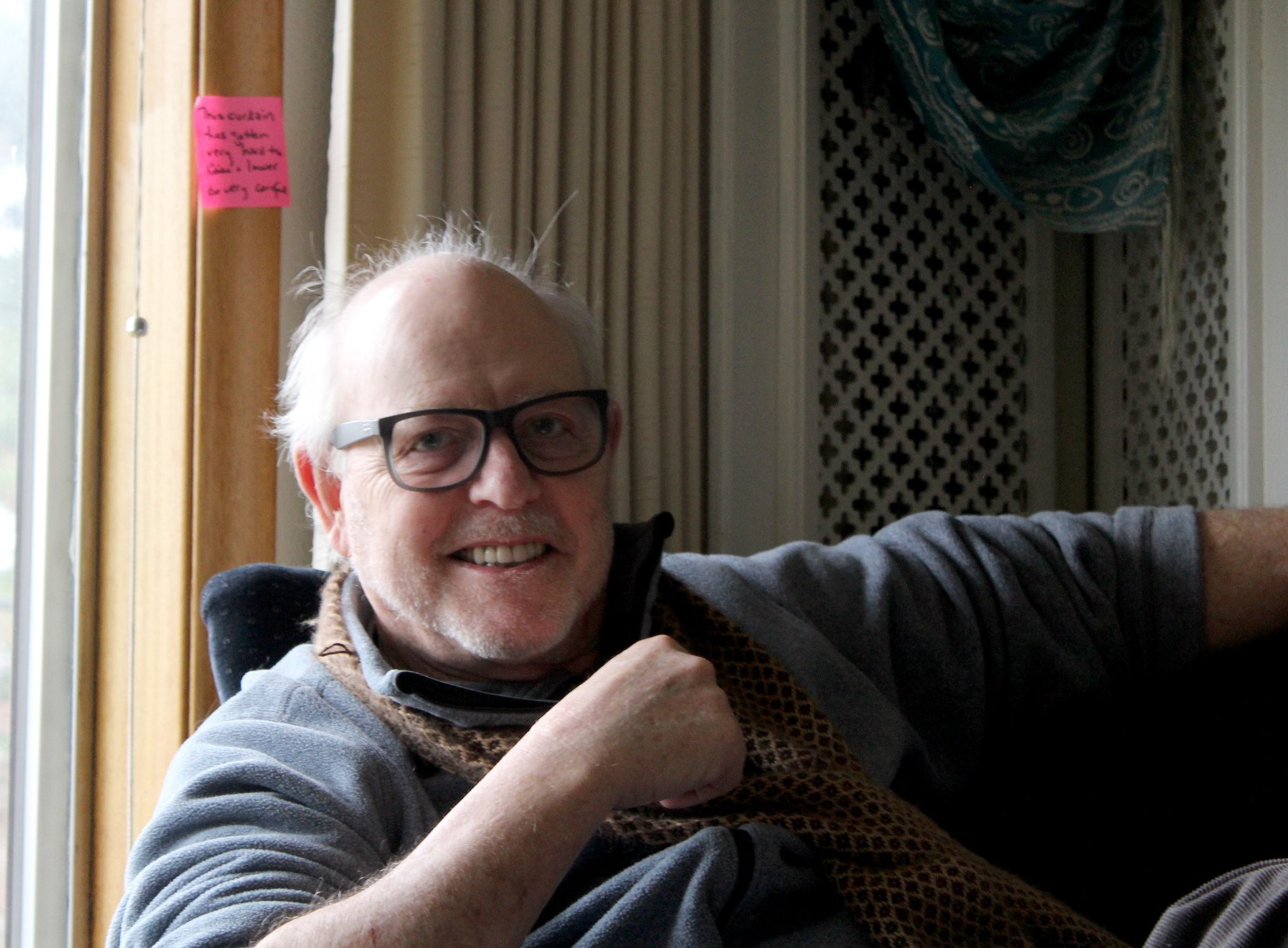
- Long in 2026
- Born: March 6, 1948 (age 78)
- Occupation: Writer
- Spouse: Susan Schweinsberg
- Children: 2
- Writing career
- Genre: Literary Fiction

David Long (born 1948) is an American short story writer and novelist. His writing has appeared in The New Yorker, GQ, Story, and has earned him an O. Henry Award, a Pushcart Prize, and a Rosenthal Prize from the American Academy of Arts and Letters. He is the author of Blue Spruce (1995), The Falling Boy (1997) The Daughters of Simon Lamoreaux (2000), and The Inhabited World (2006).

== Life and career ==
Long was born on March 6, 1948, in Boston, and raised in rural Massachusetts. He graduated from Pomfret School (1966), Albion College (1970, English), and Hartford Seminary (1972, Master's in Religious Studies). He studied with Richard Hugo, Madeline DeFrees, and William Kittredge in the University of Montana’s MFA Program in Creative Writing, graduating in 1974. Long married Susan Schweinsberg in December 1969. They have two sons, Montana and Jackson.

Long's literary career was helped along by The New Yorker editor, Roger Angell, who accepted his short story “Blue Spruce" for the November 12, 1990 issue of the magazine. “Attraction" was published in The New Yorker the following year. In 1993, Long was awarded a National Endowment of the Arts fellowship in creative writing, and his third story collection, Blue Spruce (Scribner), won the Richard and Hilda Rosenthal Award for fiction from the American Academy of Arts and Letters. Long published the novels The Falling Boy (1997) and The Daughters of Simon Lamoreaux (2000) with Scribner. The Inhabited World (2006), published with Houghton Mifflin, was named a Notable Book of 2006 by The New York Times.

In 1999, Long and his wife relocated to Tacoma, Washington. He joined the faculty of Pacific University's Low-Residency MFA Program in Creative Writing in 2005.

== Craft ==
In numerous essays and craft talks, Long has described his views on the art of fiction writing. “I’m interested in the texture of life,” Long wrote in an interview with Poets & Writers. . . “I try to fill the stories with a lot of physical detail, a lot smells and surfaces; I try to make the moments as full as I can. The language of the story is extremely important to me. It would be misleading to say I don’t care about the plot, the 'what happens,' but I discover the story by means of language, by constructing sentences."

In his craft talk "Nine Sentences," which was later published in the anthology When the Rewards Can Be So Great, Long writes about "dangerous sentences." Long says, "The sentences I’m referring to do sometimes shock, but more often they give us an odd shiver, a feeling of momentary displacement, or of being differently awake. Likewise, newness is vital, but it’s a by-product, not the thing itself. What I so much crave when I read, and recognize in these few amazing sentences, is the sound of someone’s mind working at a peak of concentration. Originality is the outcome of that deep attention."

== Selected Anthologies ==
- The Best of Montana's Short Fiction, The Lyons Press, 2004
- The New Montana Story, Riverbend, 2003
- Love Stories from the New Yorker, edited by Roger Angell, Random House, 1997
- The Portable Western Reader, edited by William Kittredge, Viking, 1997
- Best of the West 5, W.W. Norton, 1992
- Prize Stories 1992: The O. Henry Awards, Doubleday, 1992
- New Writers of the Purple Sage, Viking, 1992
- Voices Louder than Words: A Second Collection, Random House, 1991
- The Last Best Place: A Montana Anthology, Montana Historical Society Press, 1988
- Best of the West: New Stories from the Wide Side of the Missouri, Gibbs Smith/Peregrine Smith Books, 1988
- The Graywolf Annual Four: Short Stories by Men, Graywolf Press, 1988
- New American Stories: Writers Select Their Favorites, New American Library, 1987
- Writers of the Purple Sage: Contemporary Western Writings, Viking, 1984

== Awards and honors ==
- Pushcart Prize XLII1981-82 Pushcart Prize VI, 2017
- Richard and Hinda Rosenthal Foundation Award for Blue Spruce, 1996
- Blue Spruce was named one of the best books of the year by Publishers Weekly, 1995
- Creative Writing Fellowship, National Endowment for the Arts,1993–94
- O. Henry Award, for short story “Blue Spruce,” 1992
- Award for Fiction, St. Lawrence University, for Home Fires, 1983

== Bibliography ==
- The Montana Stories (stories). Norwich: University of East Anglia, 2026
- The Inhabited World (novel). Boston: Houghton Mifflin, 2006
- The Daughters of Simon Lamoreaux (novel). New York: Scribner, 2000
- The Falling Boy (novel). New York: Scribner, 1997
- Blue Spruce (stories). New York: Scribner, 1995
- Perfection (story). St. Paul: Kutenai Press, 1993 (Limited edition)
- The Flood of ’64 (stories). New York: The Ecco Press, 1987
- Home Fires (stories). Champaign: University of Illinois Press, 1982
- Early Returns (poems). Seattle: Jawbone Press 1981
