= Pamela Long =

Pamela Long may refer to:

- Pam Long (born 1953), American actress and writer
- Pamela Long (singer), member of the band Total
- Pamela O. Long (born 1943), American historian of science and technology
