= Ted Long =

Ted Long may refer to:

- Theodore E. Long
- Ted Long, a character in the Isaac Asimov novella The Martian Way
- Ted Long (ice hockey) (born 1955), Canadian ice hockey player who played in the World Hockey Association

== See also ==
- Edward Long (disambiguation)
- Theodore Long (disambiguation)
