= Matthew Long =

Matthew Long may refer to:

- Matthew Long (director) (born 1982), Canadian film writer, director, and producer
- Matthew Long (firefighter), New York City firefighter who was severely injured in 2005
- Matthew Long (rower) (born 1975), Australian Olympic-level rower
- Matt Long (born 1980), American actor
