= Susan Long =

Susan Long may refer to:

- Susan Long (journalist), Singaporean journalist
- Susan Long (skier) (born 1960), American cross country skier
- Susan Long (American Dragon: Jake Long), fictional character in American Dragon: Jake Long
