= Bill Long (politician) =

American pharmacist and politician

Member of the Indiana House of Representatives from the 29th district
- In office 1973–1982
- Preceded by: None
- Succeeded by: Sheila J. Klinker

Personal details
- Born: 11 March 1927 Lafayette, Tippecanoe County, Indiana, US
- Died: 14 March 2000 (aged 73) Lafayette Home Hospital, Lafayette, Tippecanoe County, Indiana, US
- Education: Purdue University

Bill Long (11 March 1927 – 14 March 2000) was a pharmacist and politician from the U.S. state of Indiana. A longtime resident of Lafayette, he served ten years in the Indiana House of Representatives as a Republican.

After service in the United States Coast Guard during the Second World War era, Long became a pharmacist in the city of Lafayette. While living on Ninth Street in the city's Highland Park neighborhood, he served eight years as a city councilman before being elected to the House of Representatives for the 98th General Assembly, beginning in 1973. Professionally, he was active in the Kiwanis and the local chamber of commerce, and he was a member of the Reformed Presbyterian Church. Long had no single predecessor; the entirety of Tippecanoe County was an electoral district for the 97th General Assembly, sending two representatives to Indianapolis. Throughout his time in office, Long's 29th District embraced most of the southeastern quarter and parts of the northeastern quarter of Tippecanoe County.

Long held the following committee assignments:

- 1973-1974: Ways and Means (ranking member of Budget subcommittee), Cities and Towns
- 1975-1976: Ways and Means (ranking minority member of Budget subcommittee), County and Township
- 1977-1978: Ways and Means (chairman), Cities and Towns; Interstate Cooperation
- 1979-1980: Ways and Means (chairman)
- 1981-1982: Ways and Means (chairman); Interstate Cooperation

The boundaries of Indiana House districts were reapportioned in time for the elections of November 1982; the 29th District was moved to embrace Tipton County and parts of Clinton, Hamilton, and Howard counties, and Lafayette was brought into the 27th District. Long was not re-elected to the House in 1982, and the race for the 27th District seat was won by Sheila J. Klinker, a Democrat from Lafayette.

Long died on 14 March 2000. He was briefly memorialized at the next meeting of the highest governing body of his church, due to his service as an elder in his local congregation.
