= Huey Long (disambiguation) =

Huey Long (1893–1935) was an American politician.

Huey Long may also refer to:

- Huey Long (singer) (1904–2009), an American jazz singer and musician with The Ink Spots
- Huey Long (Keck), a 1941 sculpture of the politician by Charles Keck
- Huey Long (biography), a 1969 biography by T. Harry Williams
- Huey Long (film), a 1985 documentary film on the politician
