= Larry Long =

Larry Long may refer to:

- Larry Long (politician) (born 1947), former Attorney General of South Dakota
- Larry Long (singer-songwriter) (born 1951), activist from Minnesota
