= Hypomimia =

Reduced degree of facial expression

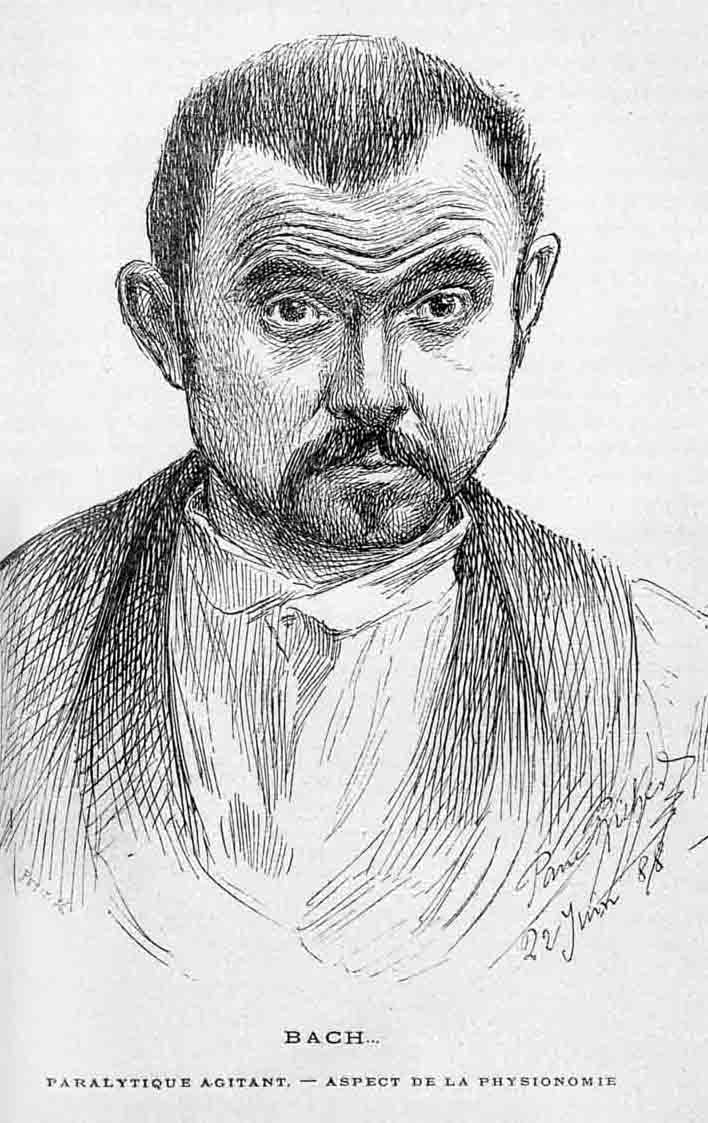
Drawing of a Parkinson's disease patient face showing hypomimia. Depiction appeared in Nouvelle iconographie de la Salpétrière, tome 1 (1888).

Hypomimia (masked facies, masking of facies, mask-like facial expression), a medical sign, is a reduced degree of facial expression. It can be caused by motor impairment (for example, weakness or paralysis of the facial muscles), as in Parkinson's disease, or by other causes, such as psychological or psychiatric factors (for example, if a patient does not feel emotions and thus does not show any expression). Persons receiving excessive Botox treatments and thus losing disproportionate facial expression features may be incorrectly identified as suffering from hypomimia.

== See also ==
- Facial expression
