= Charles W. Long =

Massachusetts politician (born 1940)

Member of the Massachusetts House of Representatives from the 10th Norfolk district
- In office 1967–1978

Personal details
- Born: August 14, 1940 (age 86) Boston, Massachusetts, US
- Education: Harvard College; Harvard Law School

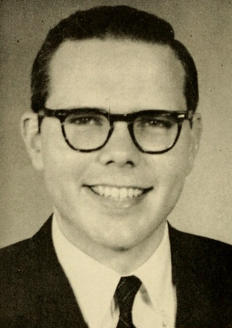
Portrait of Charles Long member of the Massachusetts House of Representatives

Charles W. Long (born August 14, 1940) was an American politician who was the member of the Massachusetts House of Representatives from the 10th Norfolk district.
