= Joseph Long =

Joseph Long or Joe Long may refer to:

- Joseph Long (bishop) (1800–1869), American evangelical bishop
- Joseph Long (mayor), mayor of Riverside, California, United States
- Joe Long (1932–2021), American bass guitarist
- Joseph Long (actor), British actor
- Joe Long (American football) (born 1989), American football player
- Joe Long (golfer) (born 1997), English golfer
- Joe Long (politician), Scottish politician
