= Blob Tree =

Visual tool to express emotions

- Original poster
- Artists: Ian Long and Pip Wilson
- Year: 2008
- Medium: Digital Art

The Blob Tree is a visual tool designed to allow individuals to express themselves and their emotions in a non-verbal way through the use of human figures known as Blobs who are genderless, ageless, and culture-less.

The original Blob Tree was created in the early 1980s by Pip Wilson and Ian Long as a way of communicating with young people and adults who found it difficult expressing their feelings and emotions.

The Blob Tree collection consists of a set of illustrations of blob figures in various poses and expressions, each representing a different emotion or feeling. These illustrations are intended to be used as prompts for individuals to identify and express their own emotions, or as a way to start a conversation about emotions and feelings.

The Blob Tree has been adopted by professionals in a variety of fields, including counselling, therapy, education, and youth work, and in a variety of settings, including schools, hospitals, community centers, and prisons. The tool's success came from its simplicity and universality where the blob figures were easily recognizable and relatable, making it easy for individuals to connect with the illustrations and express their own emotions.

== Inventors ==
The Blob Tree was created by Pip Wilson & Ian Long. Recognising the need for a non-verbal, universally accessible tool for emotional expression and communication, they developed the Blob Tree as a way to bridge language and cultural barriers and make emotional expression more accessible to people of different ages and backgrounds.

=== Pip Wilson ===
Pip Wilson (1939–2023) was born in St Helens, Merseyside. A trained youth worker working with gangs, running community centres and training youth leaders. He was author of many books including Gutter Feelings & Pip Wisdom. With many years of experience working with young people, Pip branched out specialising in team leadership, workshops, teaching and practical training in the area of emotional intelligence.

The intentions for the blobs according to Wilson was that they can "help facilitate and stimulate meaningful discussions about difficult issues or situations. Individuals or groups can start discussions by identifying themselves, or others, with an individual or group of blobs whose actions or feelings represent their own. " Wilson died on 22 September 2023. On the BBC "pause for thought", it referenced Wilson's "You are a beautiful human person", phrase which inspired much of the Blob Tree content.

=== Ian Long ===
Ian Charles Long, born in Birmingham in 1965 to Sidney and Doreen Long, is an author and artist and worked for 17 years as a primary school teacher. Long's contribution to the Blob Tree originated in discussion with Wilson who shared his ideas for a non-verbal image to help with emotional expression. Wilson gave ideas to Long who would illustrate the ideas and turn them into pictures.

With growing popularity, the Blob Tree moved away from just visual tools and began to involve conferences and training workshops ran by Wilson and later Long at the request of schools, colleges and countries most popularly in the United Kingdom, Norway, Finland, Bulgaria, Germany and Czechia.

Since Wilson's death in 2023, Long continues the Blobtree with the Wilson family, which by this time also involves daily inspirational quote images posted on social media, and a new project called the 'Visual Bible' illustrating each verse of the Bible into Blob format.

== Bibliography ==
Their most notable works include:

- The Big Book of Blob Trees (2017). This book features 70 different Blob trees that can be used as prompts to explore feelings.
- Blob Life (2012). This book looks at the journey of life which we all take from birth through to death and beyond. It covers many of the aspects of life using key aspects - birthdays, families, death, driving, shopping, holidays, school, home etc.
