= Stephen Long =

Stephen Long may refer to:

- Stephen Harriman Long (1784–1864), American engineer, explorer, and military officer
- Stephen Long (sportsman) (born 1951), former English cricketer and field hockey player
- Stephen P. Long, FRS (born 1950), environmental plant physiologist
- D. Stephen Long (born 1960), professor of ethics at Southern Methodist University

== See also ==
- Steven Long (disambiguation)
