= Thomas Warren Long =

American politician

Thomas Warren Long (January 10, 1839 – October 25, 1917) was an African Methodist Episcopal minister and politician in Florida. He fought against the Confederacy during the American Civil War and later served in the state legislature.

Born into slavery on a plantation in Jacksonville, Florida, in 1832, Long eventually escaped and fought with the Union Army during the American Civil War. Thomas Wentworth Higginson was one of his commanding officers.

Long served as Madison County's superintendent of public schools in 1868 and 1869. He represented the Marion County, Florida in the Florida Senate from 1873 until 1879. He helped organize churches for former slaves in Florida. He proposed a legislation for free public schools in Florida.

Florida's state archives have a halftone reproduction, presumably from a newspaper, of a photograph of him.

He had a wife and two daughters who he helped "spirit away" upon his return to Jacksonville after the start of the Civil War. According to Joe M. Richardson, during the war he served in the "Twenty-Third United States Volunteer Regiment" and was sent to Beaufort, South Carolina.

== See also ==
- African American officeholders from the end of the Civil War until before 1900
