= Eddie Long (disambiguation) =

Eddie Long may refer to:

- Eddie Long (1907–1958), Welsh international rugby player
- Eddie Long (1933–?), Canadian ice hockey player
- Eddie Long (1953–2017), American megachurch pastor
