= Reub Long =

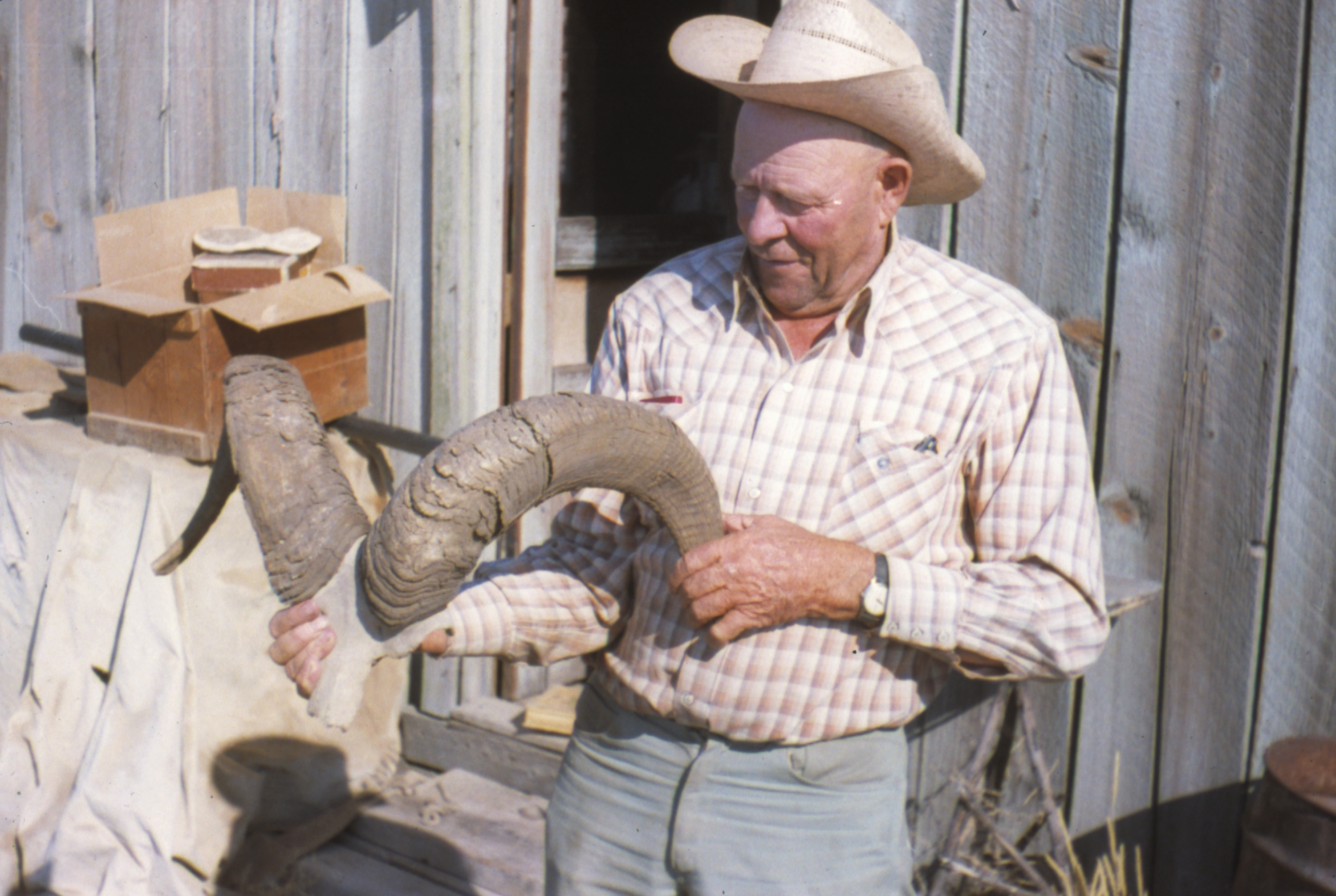
- Sage of Fort Rock at his ranch in 1966. Reub said he called this photo "One horny old goat contemplating another"
- Born: 26 January 1898; Lakeview, Oregon, USA
- Died: 28 July 1974 (aged 76); Fort Rock, Oregon, USA
- Occupation: Rancher
- Writing career
- Genre: Story teller
- Notable work: The Oregon Desert

Reuben Aaron Long (26 January 1898 – 28 July 1974) was an Eastern Oregon rancher, author, and story teller. He was known throughout Oregon as a witty and wise cowboy philosopher. In 1964, he joined E.R. Jackman to write The Oregon Desert, which is still a very popular book fifty years after its original publication.

== Early life ==
Reub was born in Lakeview, Oregon on 26 January 1898. His parents bought a ranch in the Fort Rock Valley approximately one hundred and twenty miles north of Lakeview in 1900. The family's ranch was so isolated that they only made the 200 mi (320 km) round-trip to Prineville once a year to get supplies. On one of those trips, Reub bought his first saddle for $13.50 using money he had made trading livestock and selling coyote hides. At the time, he was seven years old.

The Long ranch had alkaline soil and insufficient water to produce good vegetables. When he was eleven, his parents sent him to the Summer Lake area during the summer to raise a garden. The garden was forty miles south of the ranch, but Reub made a round trip every three days. The first day, he would ride his horse to the garden site. The next day he tended and watered the garden, and then he rode home on the third day. In the fall, Reub's family gathered two wagon loads of vegetables from his garden.

Reub had an older brother, Everett, and a younger sister, Anna. The Long children first attended school in Silver Lake. This required them to ride horses eleven miles to school each day, and then another eleven miles to get home each evening. Later, they attended school at a neighboring ranch only three mile from their home. Reub attended high school in Silver Lake, but only when he was not working. As a result, he never finished high school.

== Rancher ==
Reub lived his entire life on his ranch, adjacent to Fort Rock (now a state park) in northern Lake County. The ranch covered several thousand acres where he raised cattle and allowed wild horses to run free. Ranch life also provided the raw material for his good natured humor.

Once, after standing on the top rails of a corral above the thick dust covering a bunch of running horses, almost all of them paints, he dropped to the ground as the gate swung shut and announced, "By golly, boys, I'm a rich man; I've got 42 head of horses!" A woman standing close by looked at him in utter amazement and blurted out, "How could you count all those horses, Mr. Long ... Why ... There was so much dust you couldn't see your hand in front of your face." Reub looked at the woman almost apologetically and said, "Why it was easy, ma'am, I just counted all the legs and divided by four."

In 1938, a team of archeologists from the University of Oregon led by Luther Cressman excavated the Fort Rock Cave located on his ranch. The team found sandals made of bark and sagebrush that carbon dating proved were 9,300 to 10,500 years old. At the time, these were the oldest human artifacts ever found in North America. The success of the Cressman dig was widely publicized, and as the team's local host, Reub and his stories shared the spotlight.

When Hollywood film crews came to central Oregon to shoot westerns, Reub supplied horses, wagons, and other ranch equipment. He helped film makers scout locations and advised them on pioneer life. Reub and his wife, Eleanor, also worked as movie extras in two films. Because he was an expert at handling horse teams, Reub participated in a wild and dangerous chase scene in the movie The Indian Fighter with ten covered wagons racing across the desert. Over the years, he participated in three films: Canyon Passage, The Way West, and The Indian Fighter. During these productions, Reub got to know a number of well-known actors including Dana Andrews, Lloyd Bridges, Ward Bond, Andy Devine, Brian Donlevy, Kirk Douglas, and Susan Hayward.

Over the years, Reub had considerable influence on a wide range of public policy decisions. He served on a Bureau of Land Management advisory board for many years. He also used his influence to persuade the Bonneville Power Administration and the Federal Government's Rural Electrification Administration to bring electricity to the Fort Rock Valley. As a result, the rural communities of Fort Rock and Silver Lake, Oregon in northern Lake County were connected to the national power grid in 1955.

Throughout his life, Long was a strong advocate and supporter of agricultural education. He was a longtime member of the Oregon's State Board of Agriculture, serving as its chairman for a term.

== Sage of Fort Rock ==
In 1964, a collection of Reub's anecdotal stories was compiled into a book, co-written with E.R. Jackman. The book, titled The Oregon Desert, recounts with good humor the places, events, animals, and people that made up Reub's Eastern Oregon world. The book "successfully blended natural science with cowboy humor and scholarly prose with casual meanderings. It was a celebration of rural Western storytelling, and over the years, it has become a Pacific Northwest classic." As of 2003, the book was in its fourteenth printing.

Reub's philosophy was always practical and touched with humor. When he told a story, one topic led to another and then another without a break.

…You can usually get along if you aren't a specialist. Nowadays men list their jobs as "freight car wheel inspectors" or "bottle fillers," and if those particular jobs aren't available, the men are eligible for unemployment checks. My only way to check unemployment was to go to work - it beat hunger quite a bit, even if the work is out of one's line. So I cooked, trapped, freighted, wrangled dudes, trained horses, lambed sheep - just anything there was to do. I learned to do lots of things, but some of the things aren't of much use to me now - for example, how to put a six- or eight-horse team around a sharp bend. But some are real useful. What you learn from horses helps in dealing with humans. A horse is good for a boy or a man. It helps something inside of him. A man trained by a horse for many years is never quite the same afterward, and is better.

Reub died on 28 July 1974. His stories and anecdotes about life in rural Eastern Oregon are his legacy. They have been widely recorded and are often retold. As a result, Reub Long is still one of Oregon's best-known story tellers.

== Legacy ==
During his lifetime, Long donated property to the State of Oregon to establish the Fort Rock State Natural Area. He also created a trust that endowed a professorship at Oregon State University's College of Agricultural Sciences.

In December 1974, the Oregon Geographic Names Board named a mountain in northern Lake County in Long's honor. Reub Long Butte is a volcanic cone with twin craters. It overlooks Devil's Garden and the Fort Rock Valley to the south. Its highest point is 5,823 feet (1,775 m) above sea level.

The best known building on the Oregon State Fairgrounds is named in honor of Long and E. R. Jackman. The Jackman-Long Building was opened in 1976. It is a 48,000 square feet (4,500 m^{2}) exposition center that also houses the Oregon State Fair and Exposition Center's main office.
