= Harold Long =

Harold Long may refer to:

- Harold G. Long (1930–1998), American martial artist
- Harold Long (politician) (1941–2013), Canadian politician
- Harold Long (cricketer)
