= Geoff Long =

Australian rules footballer

Personal information
- Full name: Geoffrey Roy Long
- Born: 13 November 1929; Tasmania
- Died: 18 September 2023 (aged 93); Queensland
- Position: Centre half forward

Playing career^{1}
Years	Club	Games (Goals)
1948–60	City/City-South	229
- ^{1} Playing statistics correct to the end of 1960.

Geoffrey Roy Long (13 November 1929 – 18 September 2023) was an Australian rules footballer who played for City/City-South, in the Northern Tasmanian Football Association (NTFA) from 1948 to 1960, won a number of awards and played at representative level.

Long, who played his football mostly at centre half forward, won City-South's "Best and fairest" award in 1954 and was a member of six premiership teams. At interstate level he appeared in the 1953, 1956 and 1958 carnivals, gaining All-Australian selection for his performances in 1956. Amongst his 16 interstate matches for Tasmania he won a Lefroy Medal in 1955 and also represented the NTFA 29 times.

After retiring, Long served Tasmanian football as an administrator. He was a NTFA and Tasmanian selector from 1966 to 1979 and President of the NTFA from 1977 to 1979.

He was one of the inaugural 'Legends' inducted into the Tasmanian Football Hall of Fame in 2005.

== Honours and career highlights ==
Team
NTFA Premiership winner

- City/City-South 1952, 1953, 1954, 1956, 1959, 1960

Individual

- All Australian 1956
- NTFA Best & Fairest (2nd) 1953, (3rd) 1954, (eq 4th) 1952
- club Best & Fairest (1st) 1954, (2nd) 1953, (3rd) 1949, 1951
