= Patrick James Long =

American politician (1864–1934)

Patrick James Long (March 17, 1864 – September 20, 1934) was an American businessman and politician.

Long was born in Georgia and settled in Ironton, Crow Wing County, Minnesota in 1888 with his wife and family. He was involved with the real estate, lumber, and mining businesses. Long served as mayor of Ironton for four years. He served in the Minnesota House of Representatives from 1919 to 1928.
