= Connley Caves =

Archaeological site in Oregon

- Interactive map of Connley Caves
- Cultures: Klamath people Modoc people Northern Paiute people

Site notes
- Excavation dates: 1967-1968; 2000-2001; 2014-2024
- Archaeologists: Stephen Bedwell; Dennis Jenkins; Katelyn McDonough

The Connley Caves are a set of eight caves in central Oregon. They are wave-cut notches along a southern hill slope overlooking a marsh. Archaeological digs in and around the caves have produced many significant finds. Most notably, Connley Caves provides one of the oldest preserved examples of dietary plant matter from anywhere in North America.

== Geology and climate history ==
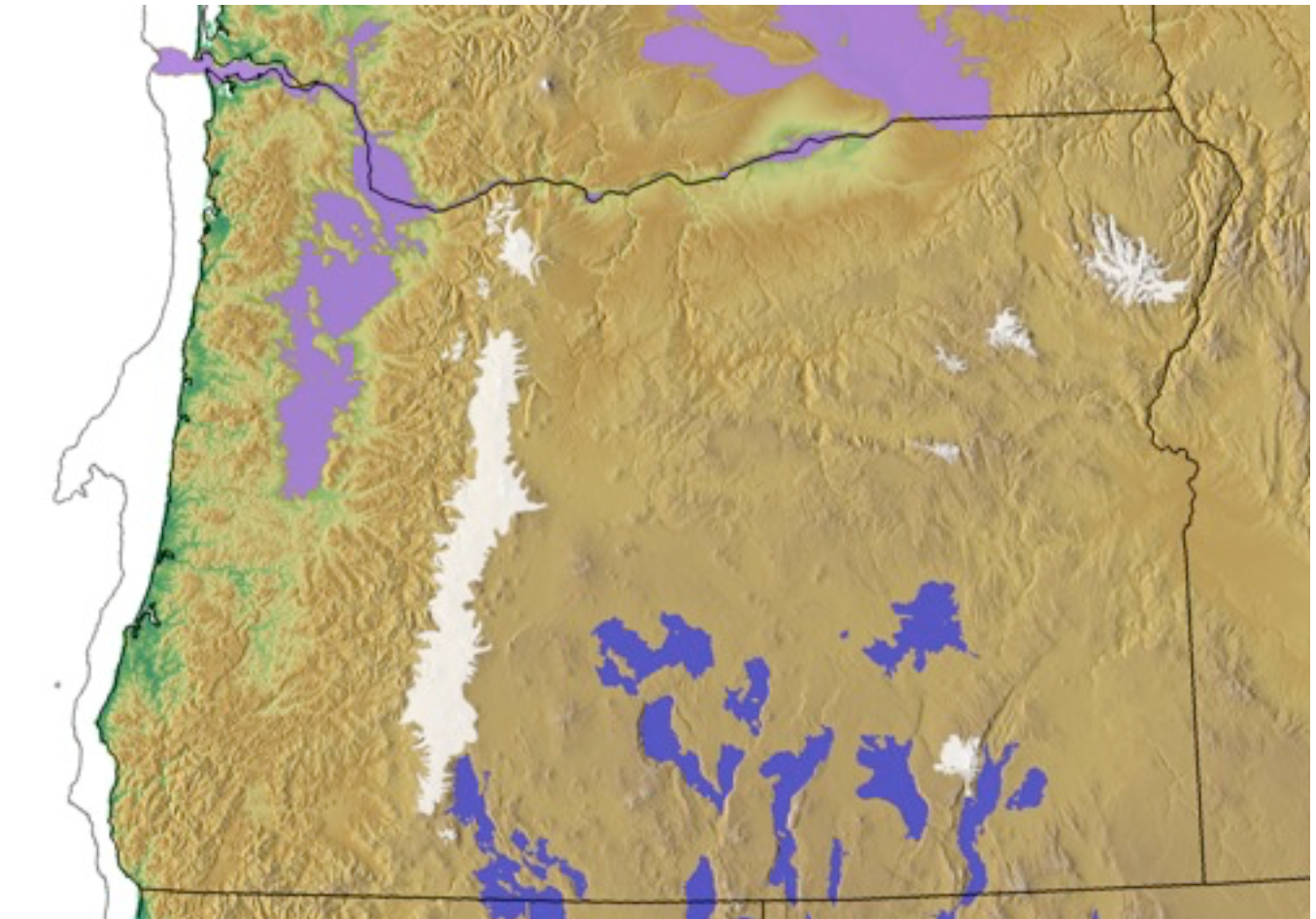
A map of Pleistocene Oregon water features including pluvial lakes, the northwestern-most of which inundated the Fort Rock-Christmas Lake Valley basin.

The caves are located within an endorheic basin located on the northwest edge of the Great Basin. During the Pleistocene, the basin was inundated with a pluvial lake which left behind four identifiable but undated shorelines. Radiocarbon dates from the lowest strata imply that the shelters were dry by around 13,200 BP, and that the nearby marsh was developed enough to support an ecosystem within a millennium.

== Excavation history ==
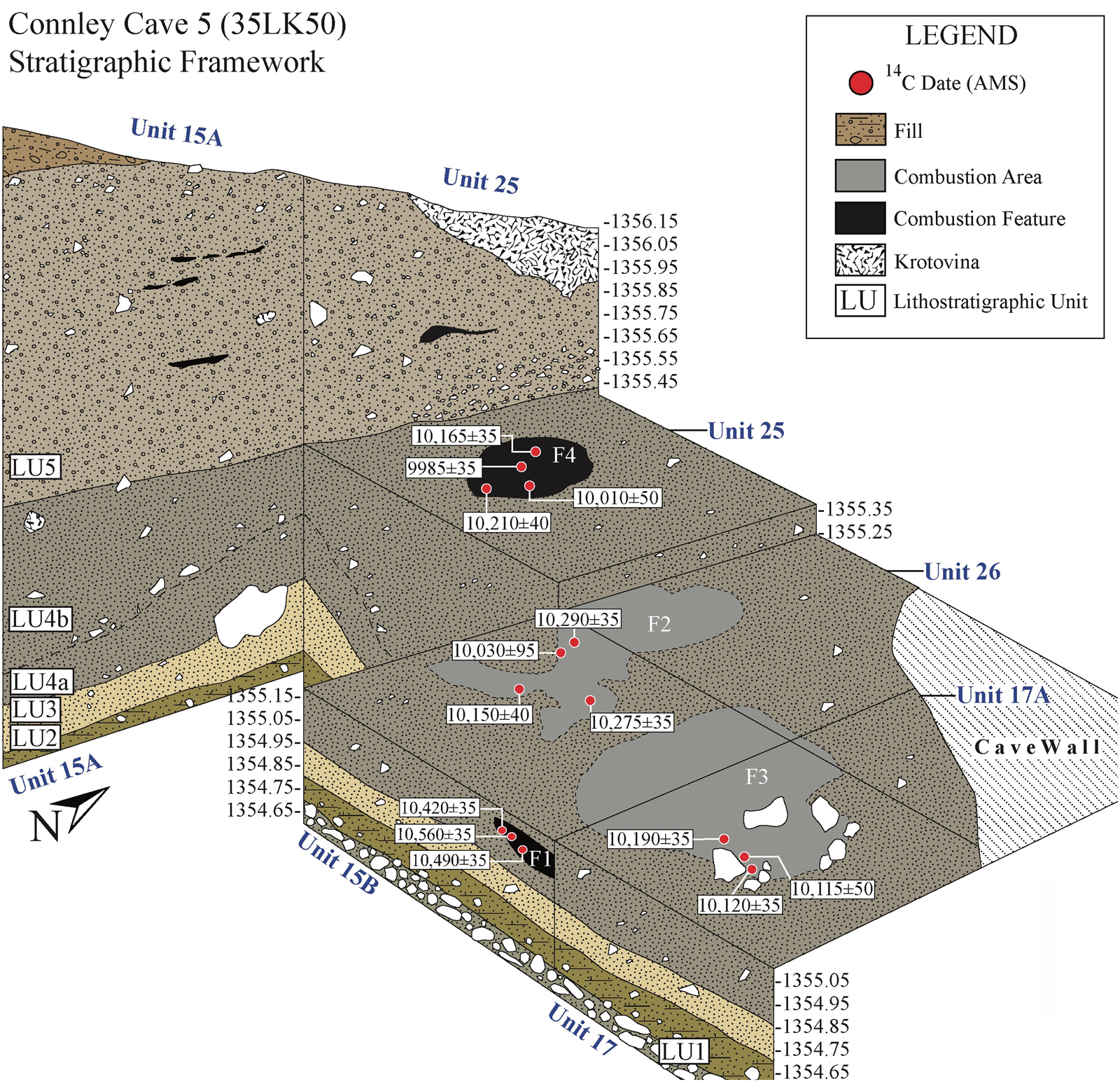
A stratigraphic profile of Cave 5 from McDonough's 2017-2019 excavations.

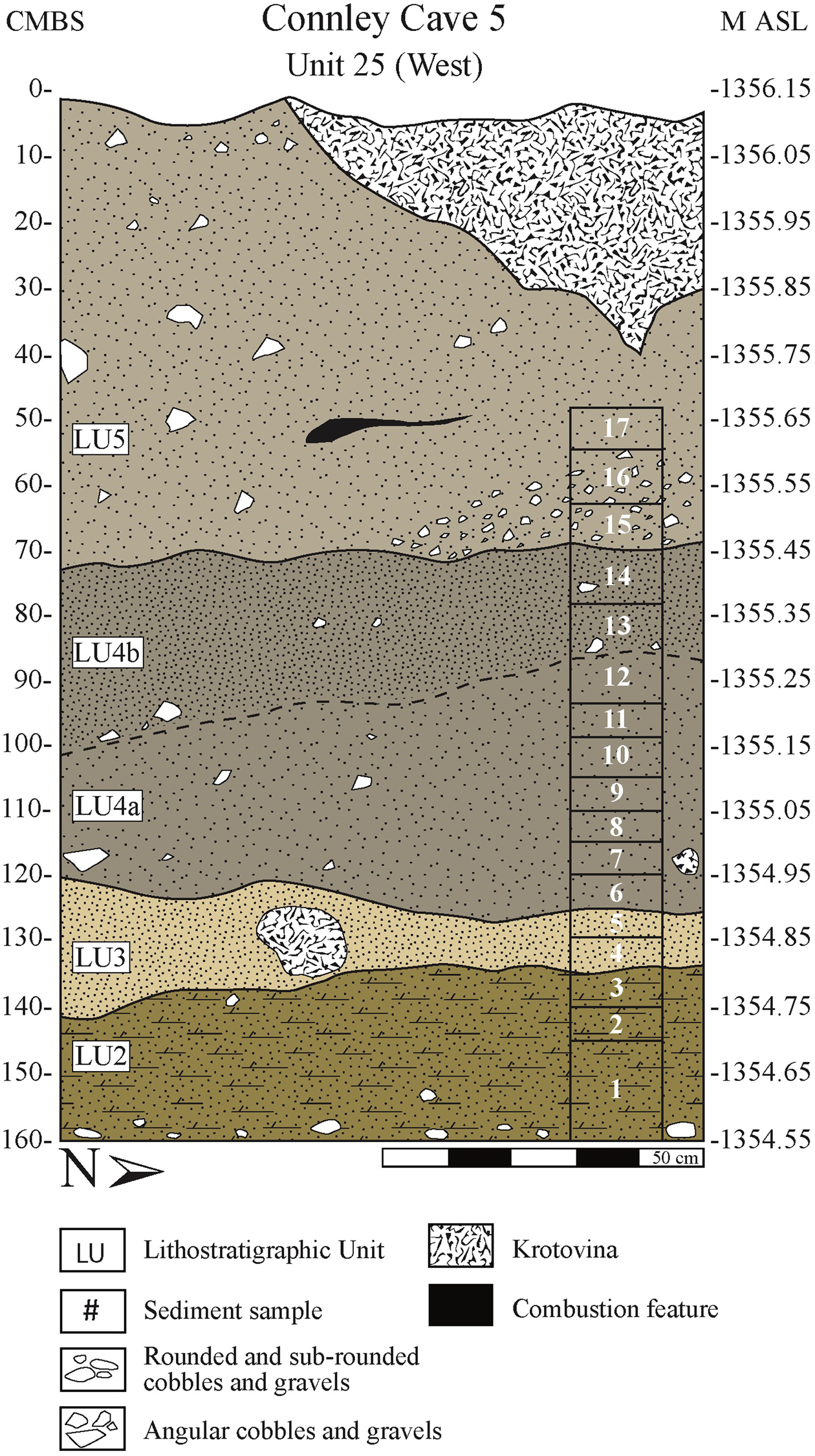
A stratigraphic diagram of the west profile of Unit 25 from McDonough's 2017-2019 excavation.

=== The Bedwell Excavations ===
In 1967 and 1968, Stephen Bedwell of the University of Oregon ran excavations in Connley Caves that would inform his 1970 doctoral thesis. This work was funded by National Science Foundation grants and was performed under the auspices of his advisor, Luther Cressman. The site was identified in a survey associated with Cressman's work in Fort Rock Cave, with which Bedwell was also involved. Upon arrival, they noted damage from looters and decided to excavate as quickly as possible.

In a little over a month in the summer of 1967, Bedwell ran excavations in ten different caves in the Fort Rock basin, including Connley Caves 1, 3, 4, 5, and 6. The excavations were expedient. Bedwell recovered ground stones, Cascade points, Haskett points, and a scraper from Cave 4; of the sixty tools they identified, in situ locations were recorded for less than half.

In September 1968, Bedwell returned with a backhoe with which he removed 2.5m of material above the Mazama Ash, before excavating a new unit. This excavation, like that in the previous summer, was done with shovels instead of trowels.

These early excavations have been criticized for imprecision. Rosencrance et al. performed a re-analysis. As part of the re-analysis, they reclassified the stone tools using modern nomenclature which had not been standardized in the early 70s when Bedwell was publishing.

=== Later UO Excavations ===
In the summers of 2000 and 2001, Dennis Jenkins brought a UO field school to Connley Caves. He brought a field school ran by the Museum of Natural and Cultural History in 2014, and would continue working on the site until after he had technically retired. The field school was then run by Dr. Katelyn McDonough, who concluded the excavations in 2024. These excavations shifted focus between different caves, with excavations in Connley Cave 5 happening from 2017 to 2019 and excavations in Connley Cave 6 starting in 2021. McDonough has been involved in many research articles pertaining to the site over the last decade.

As of 2026, there have been no announced plans to return to the site for continued excavation.

== Botanical remains and dietary conclusions ==
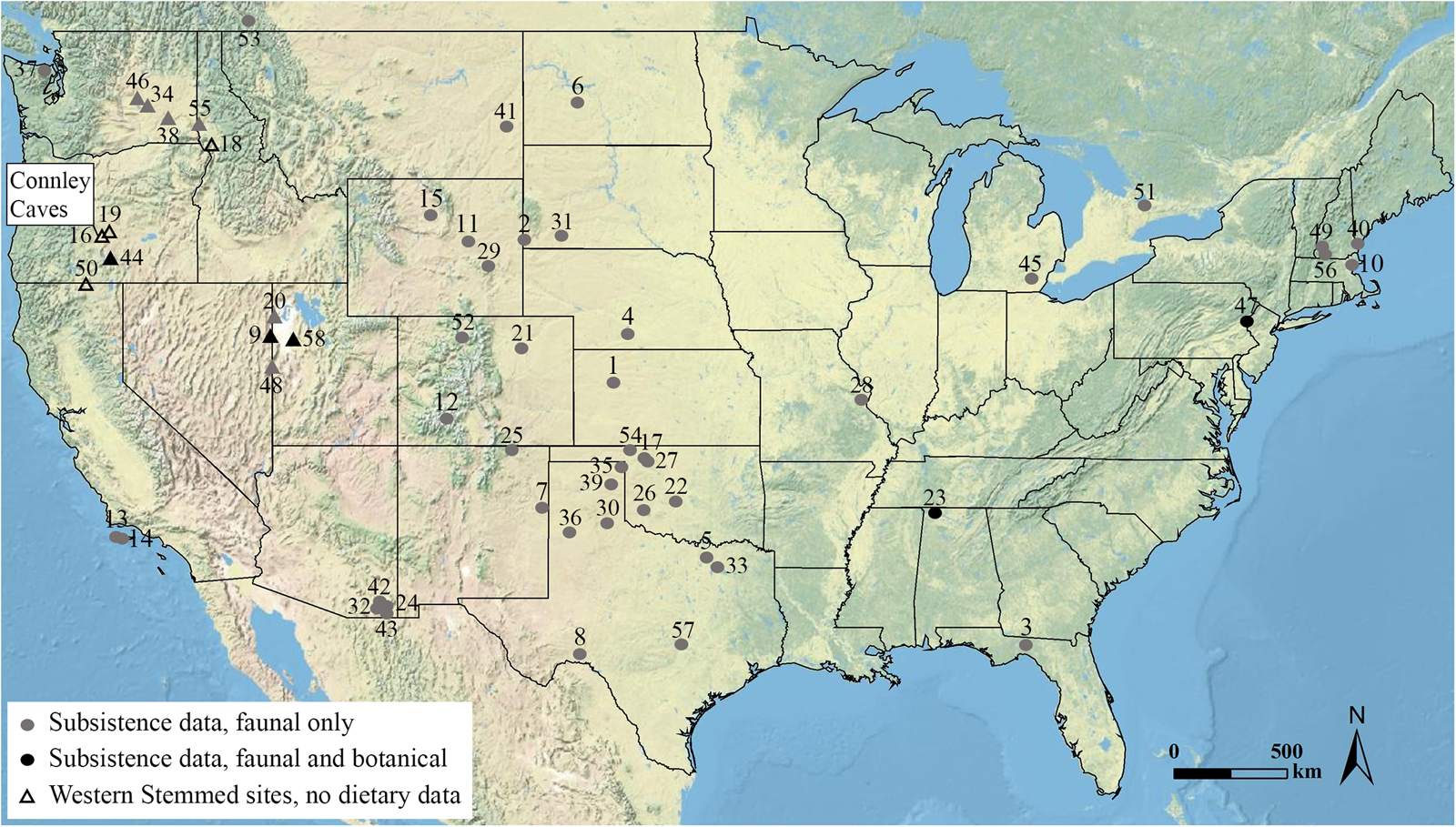
A map contextualizing Connley Caves among other contemporary North American sites (>11,700 BP) with dietary data and/or Western Stemmed points. Of particular note are Site 14 (Channel Islands), Site 18 (Cooper's Ferry), Site 23 (Dust Cave), Site 25 (Folsom), Site 44 (Paisley Caves), and Site 47 (Shawnee-Minisink).

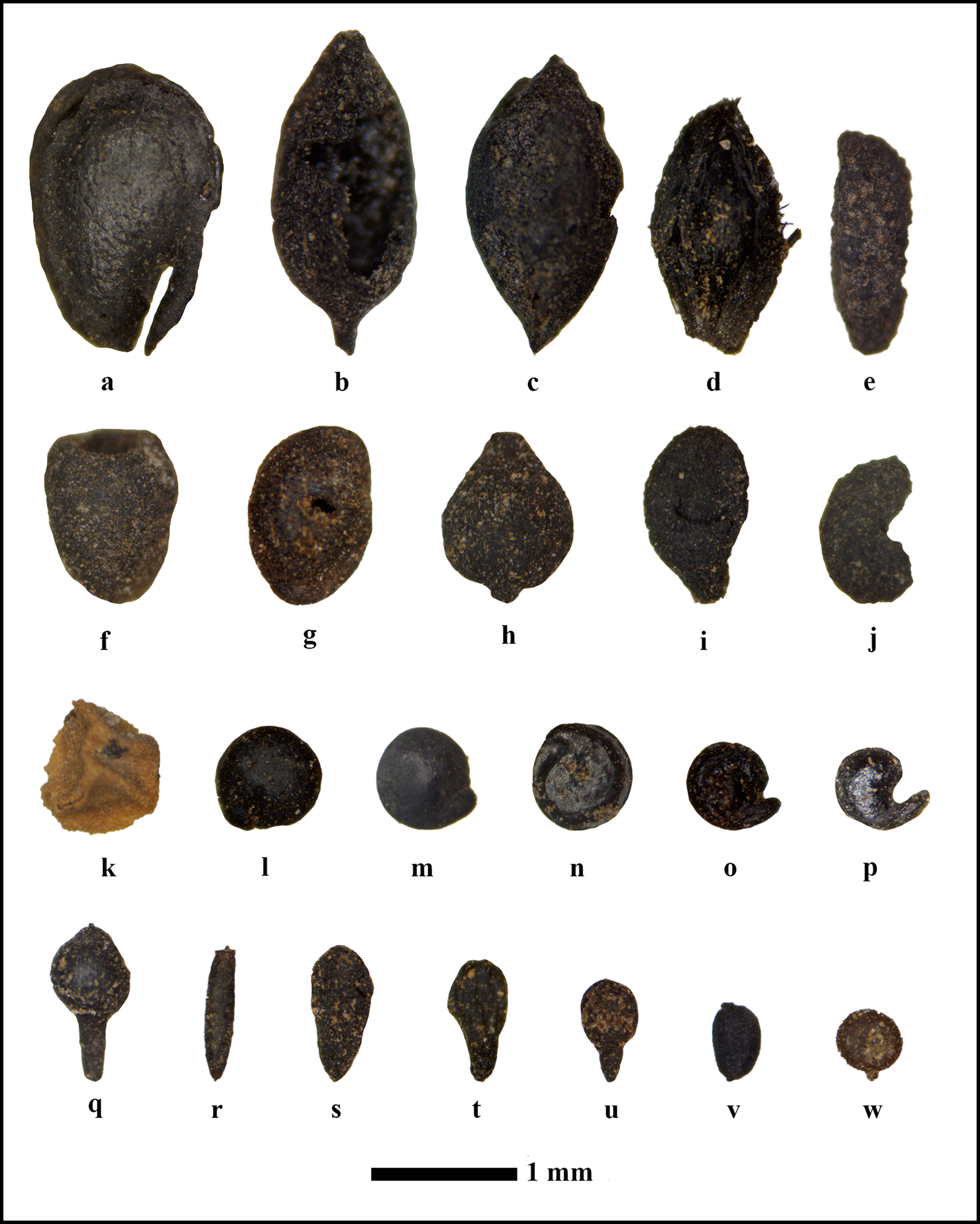
A collection of charred seeds recovered and identified from five different hearths in Connley Caves 4 and 5.

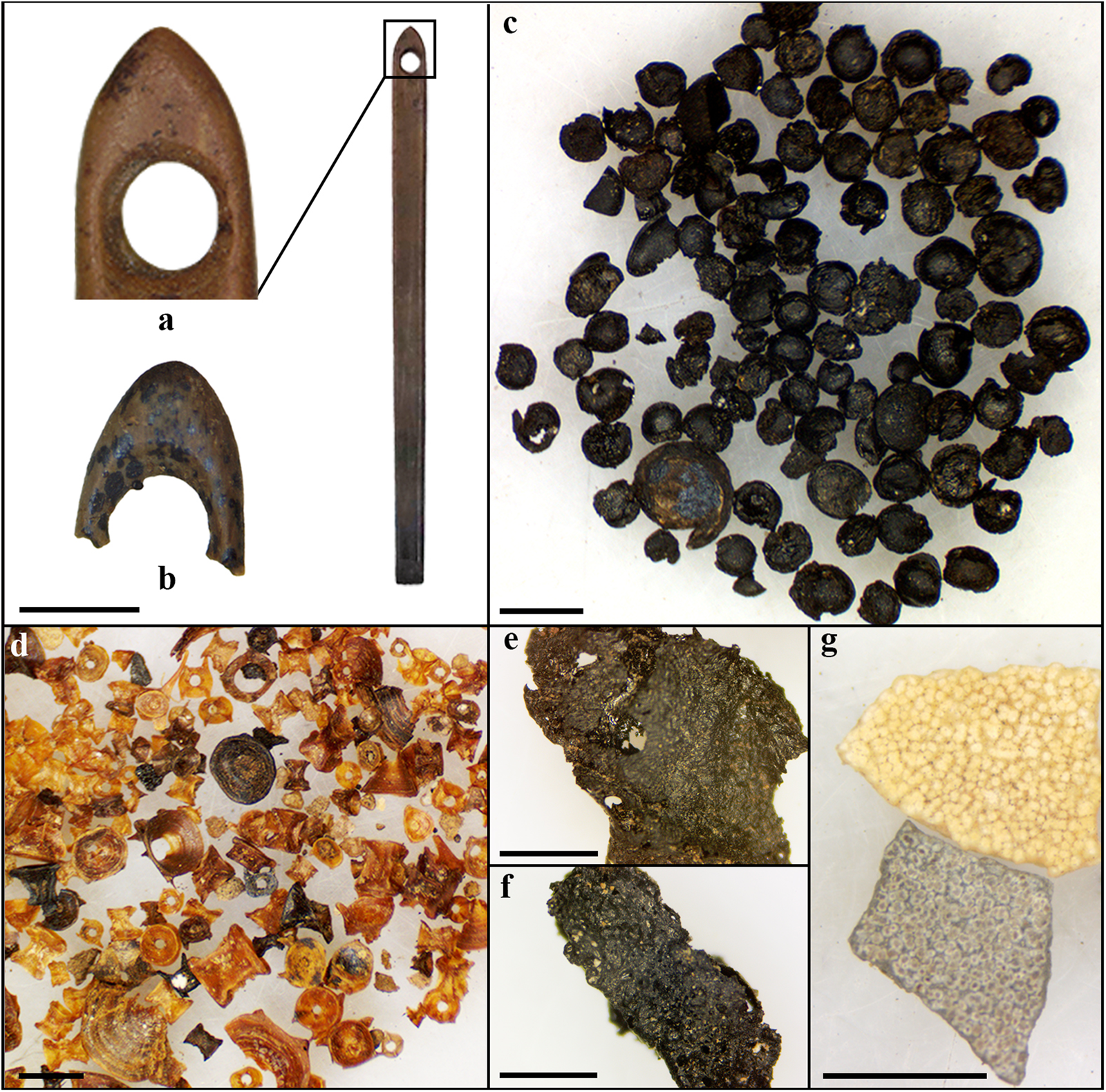
A collection of items from hearths in Connley Caves 4 and 5, including bone needles, fish bones, and eggshell remnants.

The level of preservation at Connley Caves has made it a good source of evidence for plant consumption in the North American Pleistocene. In a 2022 study, McDonough et al. found only four other North American sites from before 11,700 BP which contain identified dietary plant remains: Shawnee-Minisink, Dust Cave, Bonneville Estates Rockshelter, and the Wishbone site. As such, the information from Connley Caves' hearths is a rare glimpse into the deep past of North American plant consumption.

Analyses of hearths found probable dietary use of buckwheat, cattail, goosefoot, peppergrass, saltbush, and seepweed. These plants would have supplemented a diet otherwise consisting of fish and small game. The variety of plant matter indicates a diet which had no singular staple food.

Coprolites from Connley Cave 5 were analyzed and contained evidence of local foraging in late summer or early fall. Many of the same plants were identified, as well as sumac.

While some have argued that a lack of milling technology implies a lack of seed consumption during the Younger Dryas, others have argued that not all seed preparation methods rely upon milling.

The cattail might have been used alongside other plants similarly identified, such as rush, as a textile material. This interpretation is further defended by the presence of bone needles at the site.

There is a noted similarity in the dietary plants found here to dietary plant matter found in other Western Stemmed Tradition sites from the period, potentially indicating some level of cultural homogeneity between the various nomadic groups of the Pleistocene Great Basin.

== Lithic assemblage ==
The stone tools retrieved by Bedwell in the 1960s are extensive and varied, including side scrapers, end scrapers, Haskett points, Cougar Mountain points, gravers, and some of the first-identified examples of the Western Stemmed Tradition.

Later work found more of the same, as well as Cascade points and a chipped-stone crescent from Connley Cave 6. This crescent is not the only one to have been found in the region, as others were found in Cougar Mountain Cave, Paisley Caves, and Fort Rock Cave; however, Connley is one of only two sites on the North American mainland where a crescent can be securely dated. The crescent is made of chert, as are many of the other tools; the remainder are obsidian.

Tools were found in the same deposit spanning all states of use: unfinished construction, finished, repaired, and broken, which may imply an extended stay or many brief visits with short intervals between.

== See also ==
- Peopling of the Americas
