= Dennis Jenkins =

American archaeologist

Dr. Dennis Jenkins
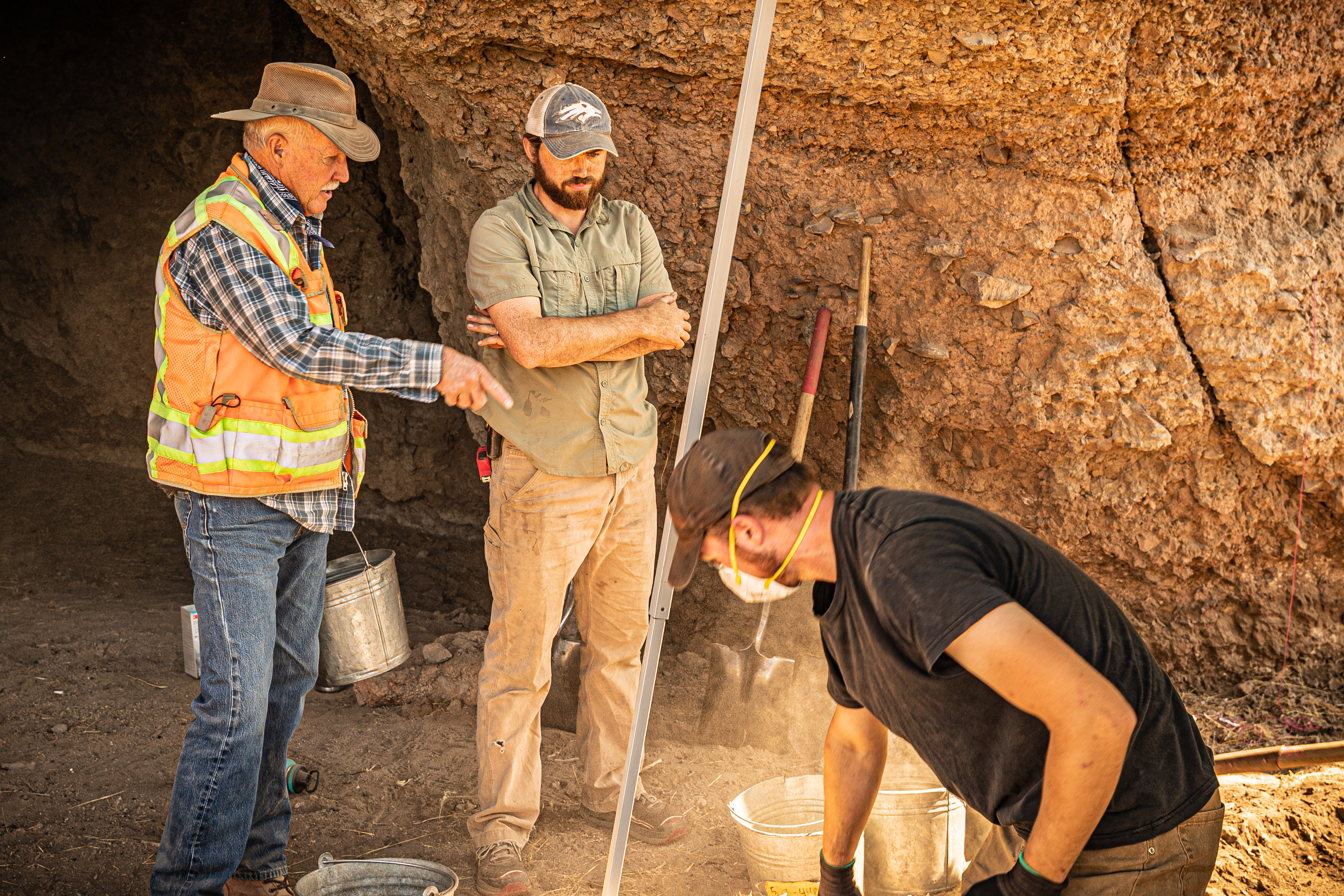
- Education: University of Oregon
- Occupation: Archaeologist
- Employer(s): Museum of Anthropology, University of Oregon
- Known for: Identifying the earliest human settlement in the Americas.

Dennis L. Jenkins is a research archaeologist, field school supervisor for the Oregon State Museum of Anthropology/Museum of Natural and Cultural History at the University of Oregon, and director of the university's Northern Great Basin Field School. One of his excavations led to a new accepted date for earliest human settlement in the Americas. Jenkins' work on coprolites earned him the nickname Dr. Poop.

== Education and career ==
From 1975 to 1981 Jenkins was an assistant archaeologist for the Museum of Natural History at the University of Nevada, Las Vegas and a student of Claude Warren. Jenkins earned a Bachelor of Arts from the university in 1977 and a Master of Arts in 1981. From 1981 to 1985 Jenkins was a field director and project archaeologist for the Fort Irwin (U.S. Army) Archaeological Project in Barstow, California. In 1986, Jenkins began work in the Fort Rock basin. The Oregon State Museum of Anthropology hired him in 1987. Jenkins received a Ph.D. from the University of Oregon in 1991. During his four years as field director of the Fort Irwin Archaeological Project, his work on the late Pleistocene and early Holocene epochs in the Mojave Desert resulted in his doctoral thesis Site Structure and Chronology of 37 Lake Mojave and Pinto Assemblages from Two Large Multicomponent Sites in the Central Mojave Desert, Southern California. Since 1987, Jenkins has worked on Oregon Department of Transportation archaeological projects.

Jenkins' primary areas of research include the ancient peoples of the Americas, particularly hunter-gatherers in the Great Basin. Techniques include obsidian sourcing and hydration analysis. His Paisley Caves excavation recovered the oldest known human remains on which carbon dating has been performed. Four years after Jenkins' work in 2002, prehistoric DNA expert Eske Willerslev analyzed his samples. Using mass spectrometry on mitochondrial DNA from coprolites, the research determined that people in haplogroups A2 and B2 lived in south central Oregon 12,300 radiocarbon years B.P., about one thousand years earlier than the accepted date for the Clovis culture. The new date of earliest human settlement, after publication in 2008, became accepted by many scientists.

Since 2000, Jenkins has served as a Chautauqua Lecturer, explaining to people all over Oregon the techniques used to research the migration of early Americans.

== Publications ==
Jenkins has authored co-authored or edited over 80 papers and publications among them are:

Jenkins, Dennis L.; Warren, Claude N. (1985), "Obsidian Hydration and the Pinto Chronology in the Mojave Desert.", Journal of California and Great Basin Anthropology, 6 (1): 44–60

Jenkins, Dennis L. (1991), Site structure and chronology of 36 Lake Mojave and Pinto assemblages from two large multicomponent sites in the central Mojave Desert, southern California

Aikens, C. Melvin; Jenkins, Denis L., eds. (1994), "Archaeological Researches in the Northern Great Basin: Fort Rock Archaeology Since Cressman", University of Oregon Anthropological Papers., 50

Jenkins, Dennis L. (2000). "Early to Middle Holocene Cultural Transitions in the Northern Great Basin of Oregon: The View From Fort Rock". In Schneider, Joan S.; Yohe II, Robert M; Gardner, Jill K (eds.). Archaeological Passages: a volume in honor of Claude Nelson Warren. Number 1. Hemet, California: Western Center for Archaeology and Paleontology, Publications in Archaeology. pp. 69–109. ISBN 978-0-9713558-0-4.

Jenkins, Denis L.; Connolly, Thomas J.; Aikens, C. Melvin, eds. (2004), "Early and Middle Holocene Archaeology of the Northern Great Basin", University of Oregon Anthropological Papers., 62

Jenkins, Dennis L.; Willerslev, Eske; Davis, Loren G. (13 February 2008), Preliminary Report of Archaeological, Geoarchaeological, and Molecular Genetic (mtDNA) Evidence for Pre-Clovis Occupation of the Paisley 5 Mile Point Caves in the Northern Great Basin, Paleoamerican Origins Workshop, Austin, Texas

Gilbert, M. Thomas P.; Jenkins, Dennis L.; Götherstrom, Anders; Naveran, Nuria; Sanchez, Juan J.; Hofreiter, Michael; Thomsen, Philip Francis; Binladen, Jonas; Higham, Thomas F. G.; Yohe II, Robert M.; Parr, Robert; Cummings, Linda Scott; Willerslev, Eske (9 May 2008). "DNA from Pre-Clovis Human Coprolites in Oregon, North America". Science. 320 (5877): 786–789. Bibcode:2008Sci...320..786G. doi:10.1126/science.1154116. PMID 18388261. S2CID 17671309.
