= La Prele Mammoth Site =

Archaeological site in Wyoming, U.S.

La Prele Mammoth Site (48CO1401), originally named the Hinrichs Mammoth Site and later the Fetterman Mammoth Site, is an archaeological site on a 7 meter deep alluvial terrace of the La Prele Creek in Converse County, Wyoming near Douglas. The La Prele Creek is a tributary of the North Platte lying about 1.6 kilometers from the confluence. The alluvial terrace dates from 20,000 to 8000 CYBP (calendar years before present) and Early Paleoindian occupation has only been found in one layer. The site area was at least 4500 square meters and had a "large campsite containing multiple concentrations of artifacts likely representing several residential features". Geochemical analysis of red ocher found at the site found it came from the Powars II ocher quarry about 100 kilometers distant.

== Excavations ==
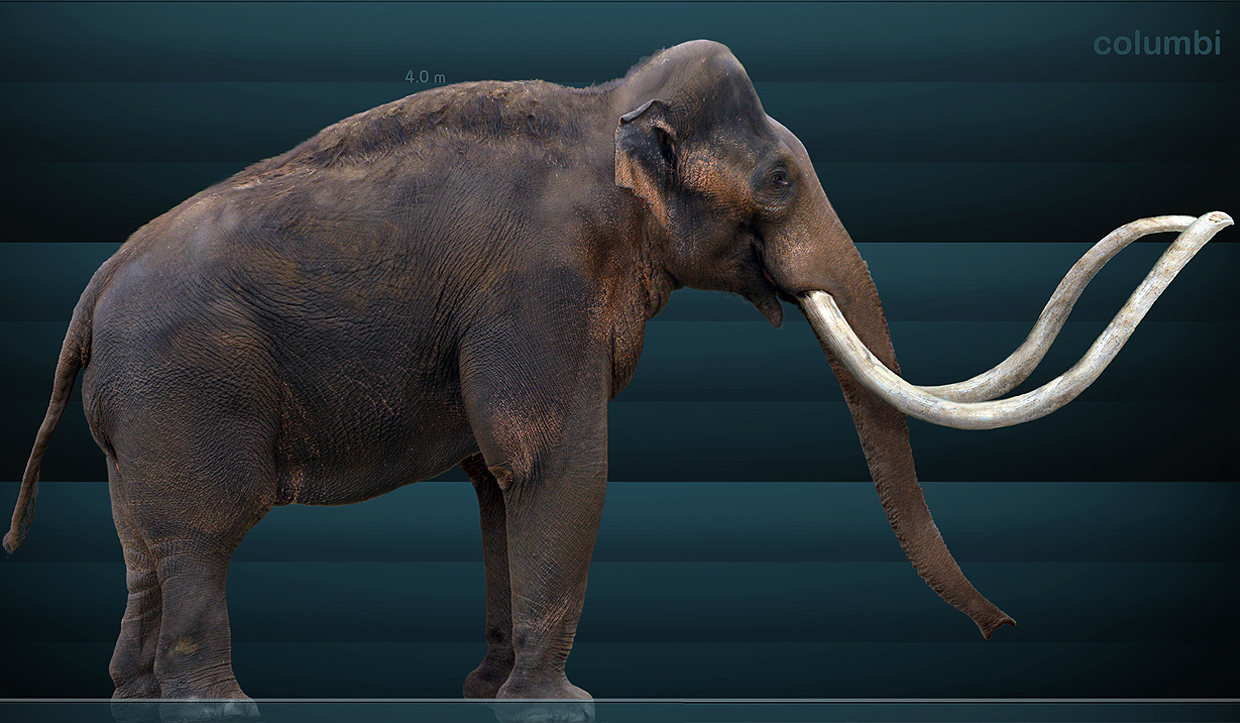
Columbia mammoth

Work at the site began in 1987 conducted by Dr. George Frison, after being located by two "avocational collectors", found a partial subadult Columbian mammoth and a chipped stone flake tool and two flakes, both in situ and a possible hammerstone. Seven more flakes were recovered from the transport plaster. Excavation extent was a 3 meter by 4 meter square. A subsequent analysis disputed the association between the faunal remains and the occupation remains, mainly based on weathering and the lack of butchering marks, resulting in the site being discounted.

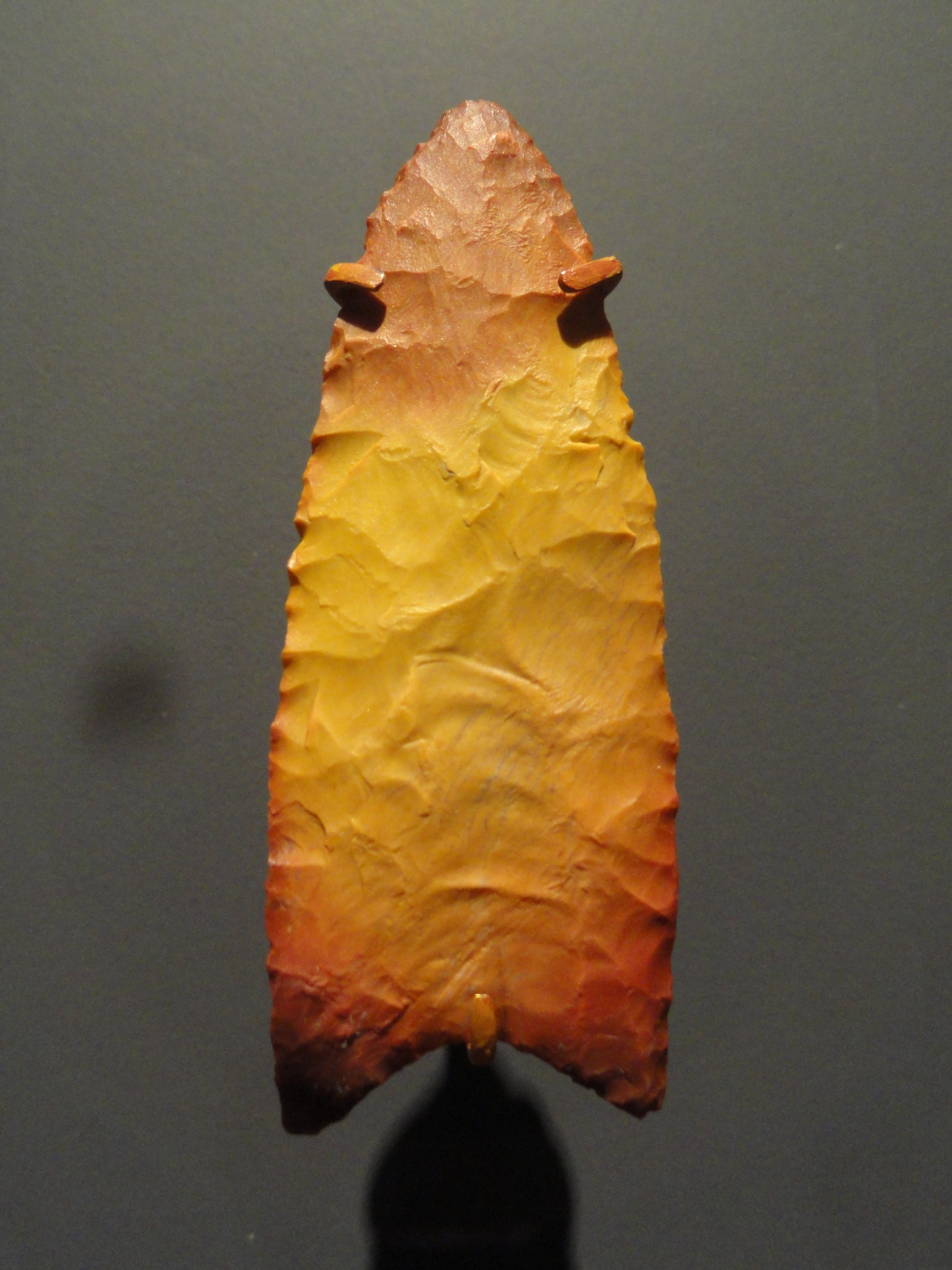
Clovis point, Sevier County, Utah, chert - Natural History Museum of Utah

Excavation resumed in 2014 and continued for four seasons, until 2017. Total excavation area was about 100 square meters plus six geologic trenches. Multiple occupation areas were found with about 1,700 pieces of chipped stone, 500+ bone fragments, and 1,600+ ocher pieces. Crossover immunoelectrophoresis and microwear lithic analysis were conducted on the recovered stone tools detail use in butchery, hide cutting, and hide scrapping. This excavation improved the case for association between the faunal remains and the occupation remains but not to certainty. The site held "domestic areas with likely residential features". Test pits determined the occupation are was at least 500 square meters and in the process found a distal portion of a Clovis projectile point

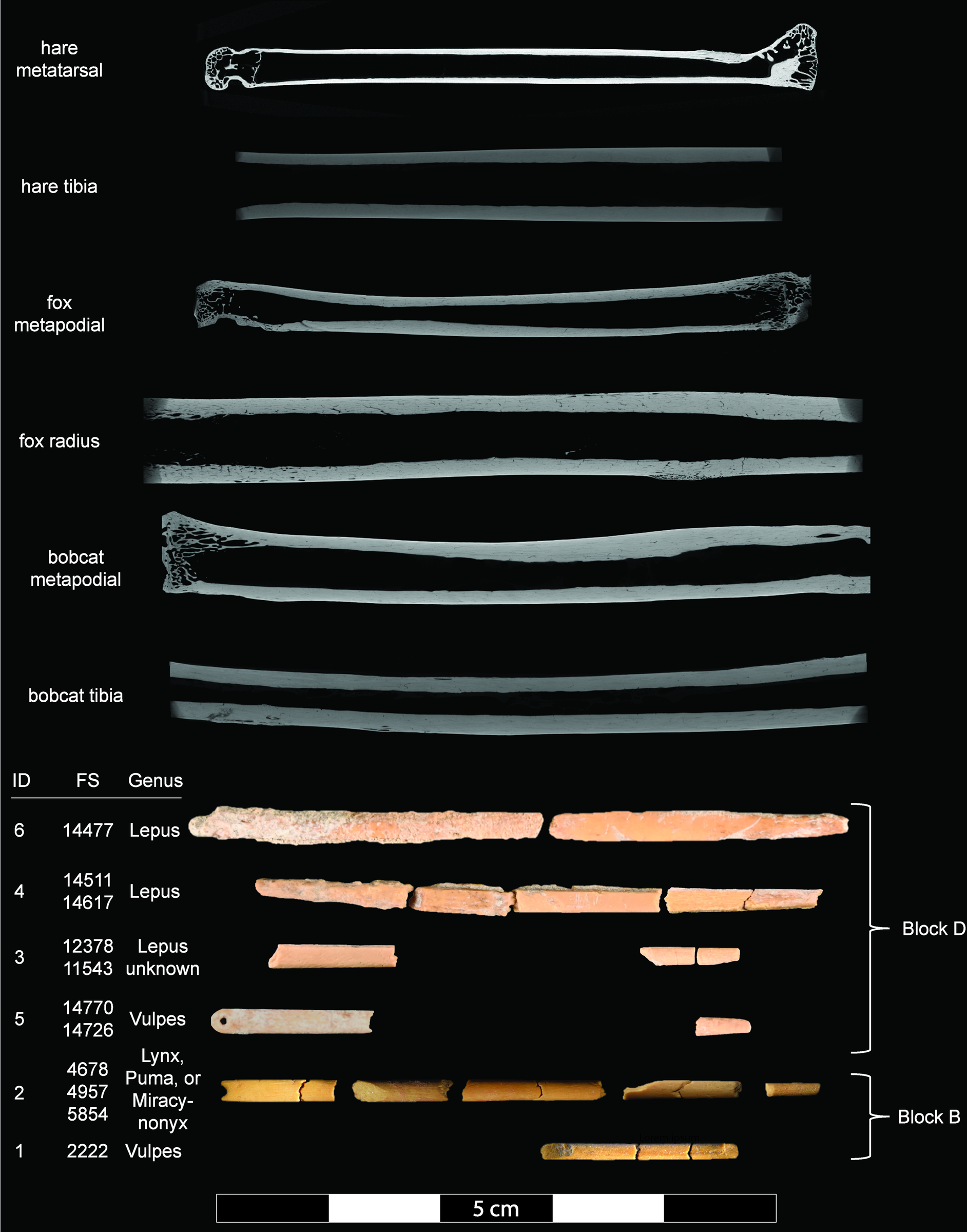
Bone needle and needle preform reconstructions and Micro-CT scans of comparative faunal specimens from the La Prele site, Wyoming, USA

After a year hiatus work resumed in 2019 and again in 2021. A 15 meter by 20 meter section was excavated west of the Clovis point findspot and 1 meter by 1 meter test pits were dug every 3 meters.This section (Area D) produced an "extensively occupied house floor and adjacent yard area". Auger testing and an additional pit in 2022 again expanded the occupation area to 650 square meters. Work in 2023 continued with auger testing. which expanded the site extent to 4500 square meters. Finds included a Clovis bead, made from hare bone. Also excavated were bone eyed needles, likely used to stitch clothes from fur. They were made of jackrabbit, red fox, and feline (suggested to be either bobcat, Canada lynx, cougar, or American cheetah) bone, suggesting that these species were likely exploited for their pelts.

Radiocarbon dating of two mammoth bone samples in 2002 gave dates of 8890 ± 60 CYBP and 9060 ± 50 CYBP though the researcher noted that possibility of collagen contamination in the samples. A more recent dating of three mammoth bone samples from the original excavation gave dates of 10,760 ± 30 CYBP, 10,965 ± 30 CYBP, and 11,035 ± 50 CYBP. The most recent excavators determined a date of 11,066 ± 61 CYBP for an original mammoth bone sample. All of these dating attempts are considered to be methodologically flawed. Based on two modern radiocarbon dating attempts occupation at the site is considered to date to 12,941 ± 56 CYBP. All dates were calibrated using OxCal with the IntCal 13 calibration curve.

== See also ==
- Clovis Culture
- Cooper's Ferry site
- East Wenatchee Clovis Site
- Gault site
- Paisley Caves
- Rimrock Draw Rockshelter
