= Cooper's Ferry site =

Archaeological site in western Idaho, USA

Cooper's Ferry Site
- Location within Idaho
- 45.906°N 116.396°W
- Type: archeological site
- Cultures: Clovis
- Location: Cooper's Ferry, Idaho

Site notes
- Excavation dates: 1961-1962, 1964, 1997, 2009-2018
- Archaeologists: B. Robert Butler, Loren G. Davis
- Owner: Private
- Public access: Yes

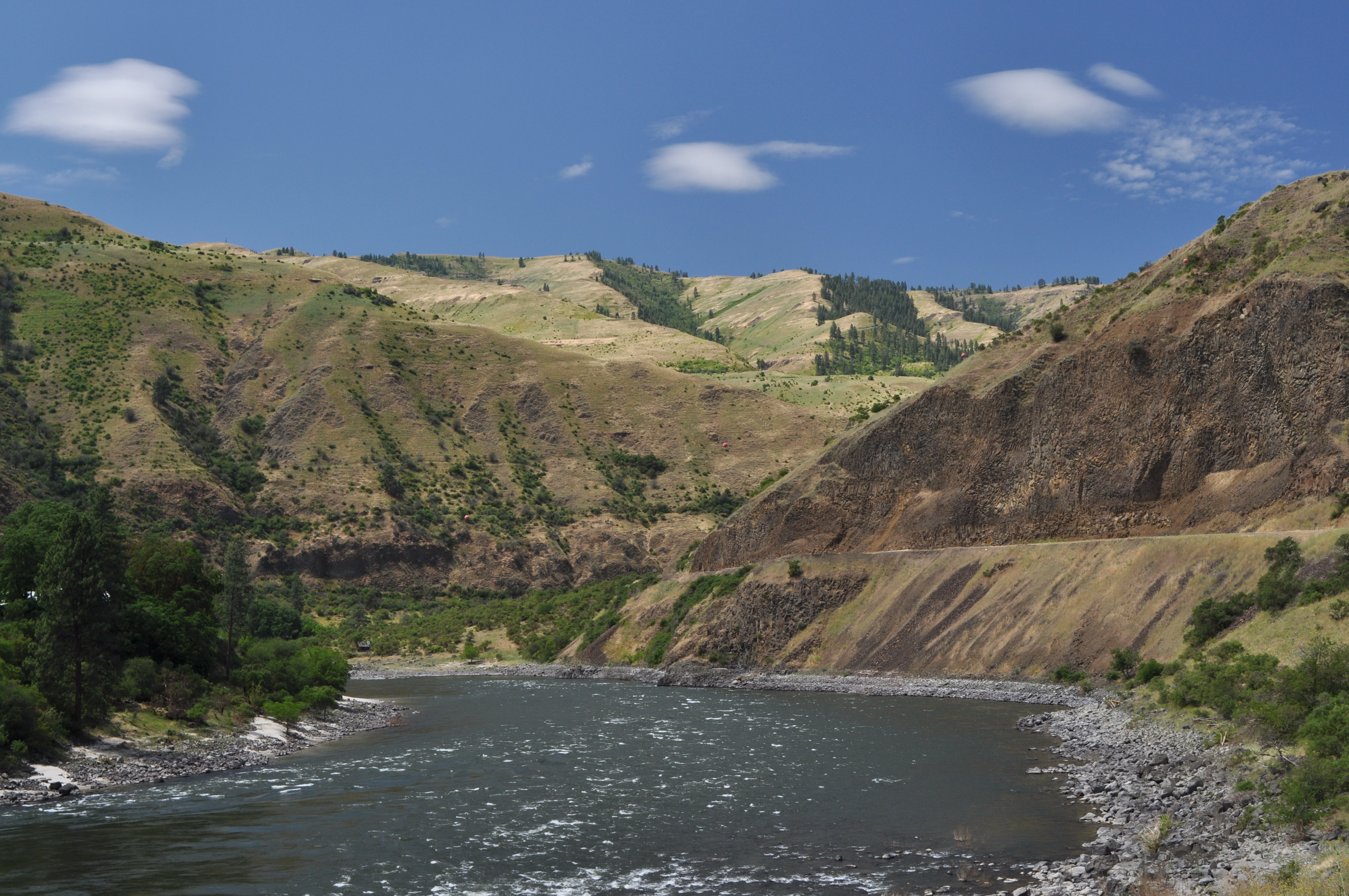
Along the lower Salmon River at Cooper's Ferry near Cottonwood

Cooper's Ferry is an archaeological site along the lower Salmon River near the confluence with Rock Creek in the western part of the U.S. state of Idaho, and part of the Lower Salmon River Archeological District. It is 17 kilometres (11 mi) south of the town of Cottonwood and 63 kilometres (39 mi) upstream from the Snake River. Various lithic and animal remains from the Pleistocene to early Holocene ages have been found there. The site is on traditional Nez Perce land, and known to the tribe as the historical village of Nipéhe. Points found at the site share similarities with Haskett projectile points.

== Archaeology ==
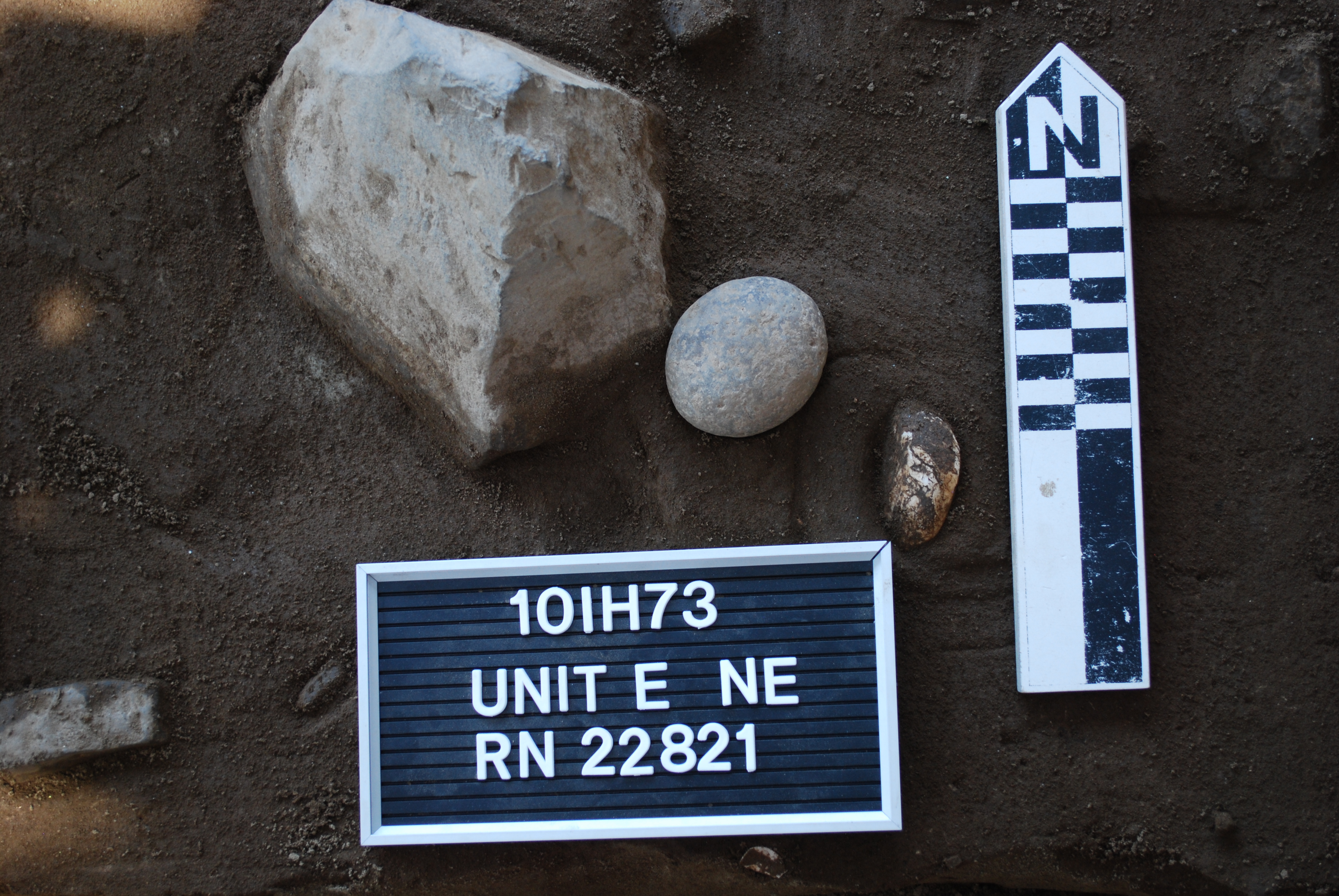
Cooper's Ferry Archaeological Site

Initial excavation at the site was conducted by B. Robert Butler in 1961, 1962, and later in 1964. Stemmed projectile points were recovered in a stratified context; no chronometric dating occurred. In 1997 Loren G. Davis conducted a test excavation finding four stemmed points, in the same horizontal position, and 9 other lithic tools (one large uniface, three blades, two lithic cores, two modified flake tools, and a hammerstone). The points were typical of those found in the Columbia Plateau and radiocarbon dated to 11,370 ± 40 years Before Present. A bone containing a butchering cut mark was also found. Radiocarbon dating of the full excavation produced dates which ranged from Pleistocene to early Holocene ages as the excavation deepened.

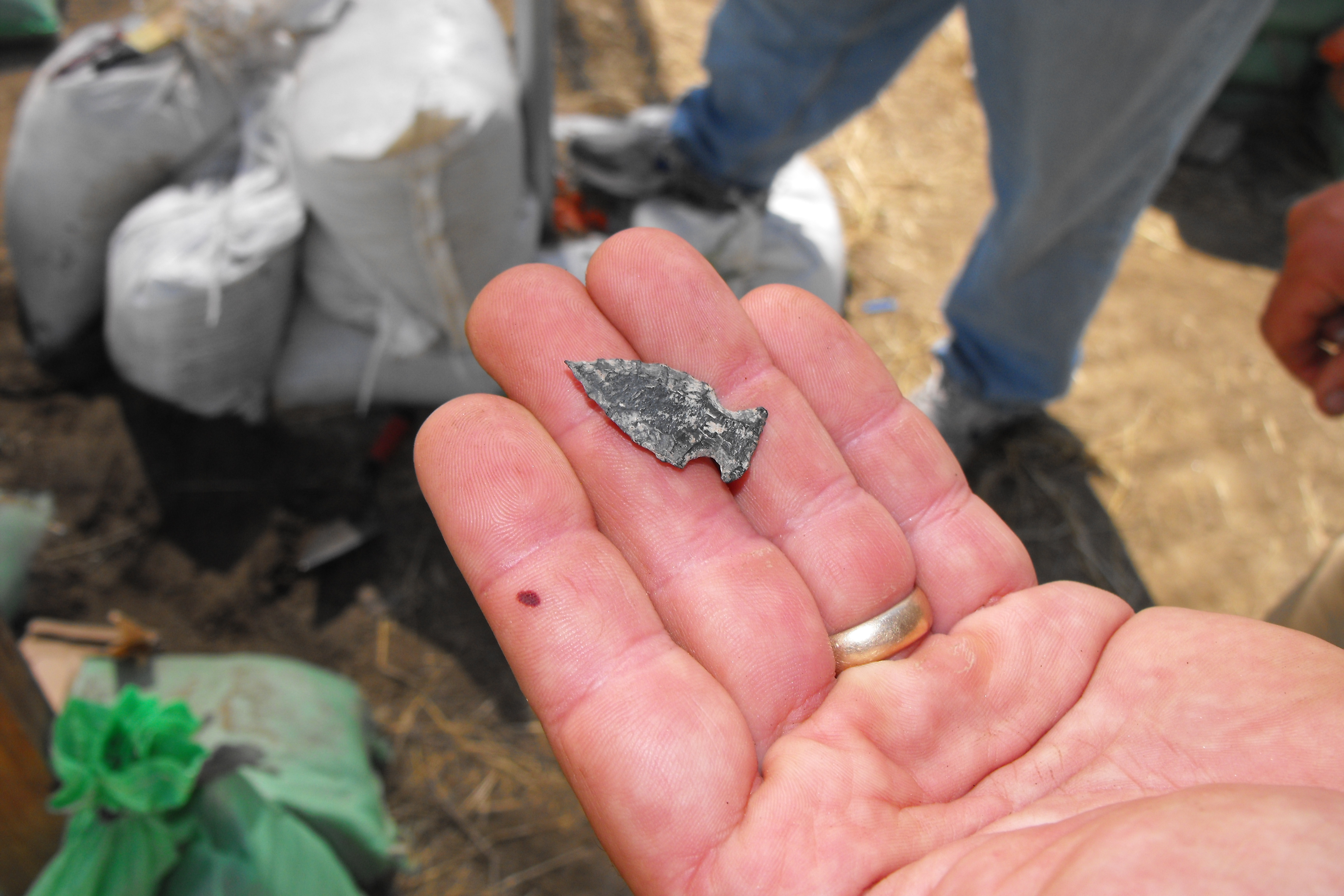
Cooper's Ferry Archaeological Site

The most recent work at the Cooper's Ferry site was a joint effort of Oregon State University and the Bureau of Land Management and led by Loren G. Davis. Excavation began in 2009 and ran until 2018. A hearth, pits, and animal bones including extinct horses were found. A number of spear points from the Western Stemmed Tradition (WSPT or WST) were found in a clearly defined pit. These points have been found in various locations, including British Columbia and Texas. Similar points were found in Japan from this period, though the similarity has been challenged. Between 2012 and 2017, thirteen complete and incomplete projectile points were found. They ranged from 0.5 inches to 2.0 inches in length. The points had two ends, one sharpened and one stemmed, and were found in pits. Radiocarbon dating provided a date mapping to 15,700 years ago. This would be several thousand years before the Clovis fluted points. It has been noted that the dearth of dendrochronological data for America in that period limits radiocarbon calibration. Several researchers have suggested a later date for the finds, but were rebuffed by Davis, noting the criticisms held "many factual errors, completely invented attributions, and poorly constructed arguments." The excavators have suggested their finds support the idea that early Americans arrived via a coastal route followed by riverine travel. An analysis of the data in 2022 supported the earlier dating though the issue is far from closed.

== See also ==
- Archaeology of the Americas
- East Wenatchee Clovis Site
- Folsom point
- Chipped-stone crescent
- Gault site
- La Prele Mammoth Site
- Paisley Caves
- Rimrock Draw Rockshelter
