= Willamette Meteorite =

Iron-nickel meteorite found in Oregon, U.S.

Willamette
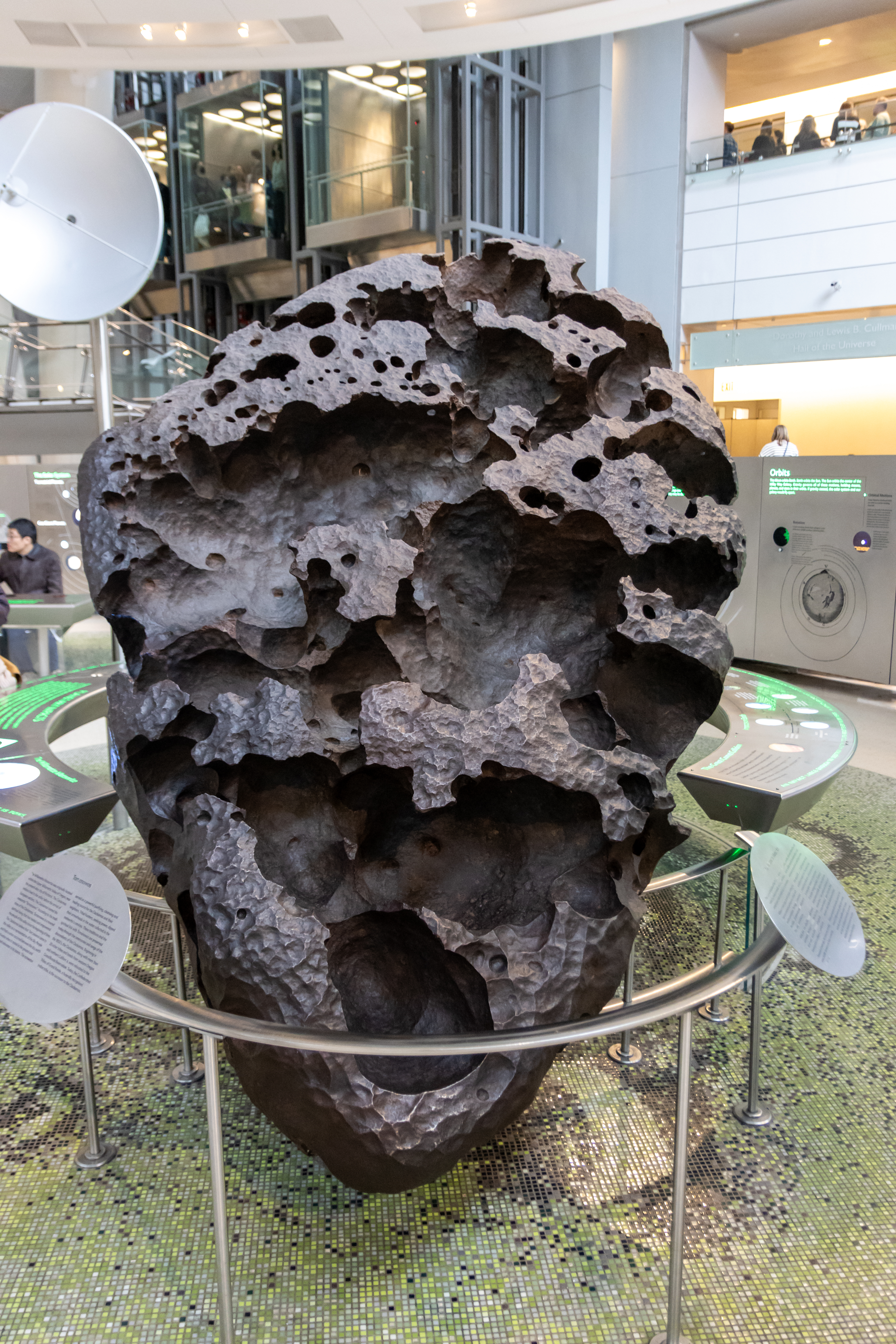
- Willamette Meteorite at the American Museum of Natural History
- Type: Iron
- Structural classification: Medium octahedrite
- Group: IIIAB
- Composition: 91% Fe, 7.62% Ni, 18.6ppm Ga, 37.3ppm Ge, 4.7ppm Ir
- Country: United States
- Region: Oregon
- Coordinates: 45°22′N 122°35′W
- Observed fall: No
- Found date: Unknown; by 1902
- TKW: 14,150 kilograms (15.60 short tons)
- Related media on Wikimedia Commons

The Willamette Meteorite, officially named Willamette and originally known as Tomanowos by the Clackamas Chinook Native American tribe, is an iron-nickel meteorite found near Oregon City in the Willamette Valley of the U.S. state of Oregon. The meteorite is the largest one found in the United States.

Euro-American society became aware of its existence in 1902, and for a long time it was seen as the sixth largest meteorite in the world. However, with new samples such as El Ali and Gancedo being discovered, the Willamette is no longer in the top ten largest meteorites in the world.

There was no impact crater at the discovery site; researchers believe the meteorite landed in what is now Canada or Montana, and was transported as a glacial erratic to the Willamette Valley during the Missoula Floods at the end of the last Ice Age (~13,000 years ago). It has long been held sacred by indigenous peoples of the Willamette Valley, including the federally recognized Confederated Tribes of the Grand Ronde Community of Oregon (CTGR).

The meteorite is on display at the American Museum of Natural History in New York City, which acquired it in 1906. Having been seen by an estimated 40 million people over the years, and given its striking appearance, it is among the most famous meteorites. In 2005, the CTGR sued to have the meteorite returned to their control, ultimately reaching an agreement that gave the tribe access to the meteorite while allowing the museum to keep it as long as they are exhibiting it.

== Etymology ==
The Clackamas Chinook called the meteorite t’əmanəwas, translated as "spirit power". This name is still used today by the Confederated Tribes of the Grand Ronde, which includes descendants of the Clackamas Chinook and is considered that group's legal successor. Alternate spellings including Tomanowos and Tamanowas.

== Physical characteristics and formation ==
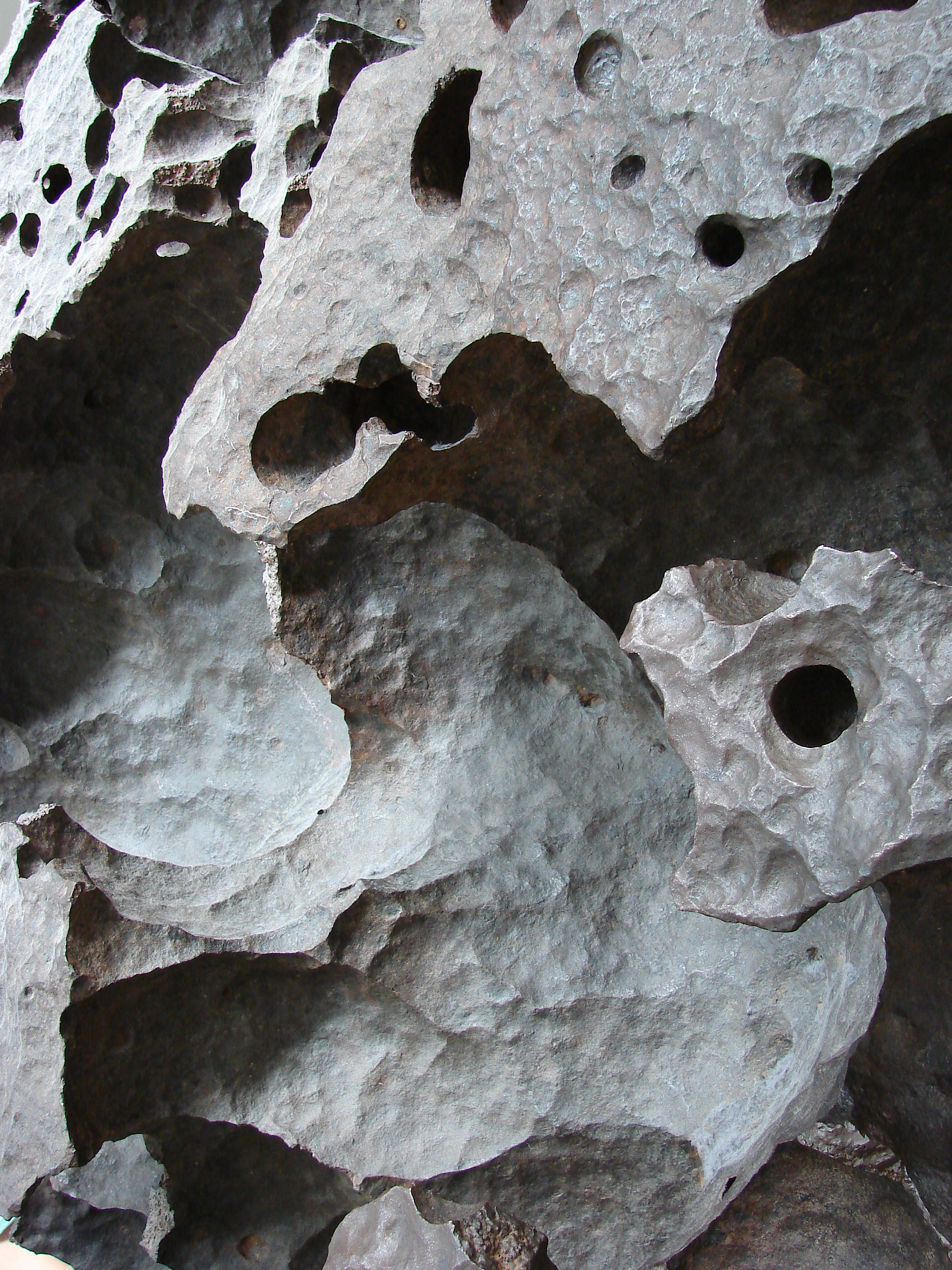
Close-up of the meteorite

The Willamette Meteorite weighs about 34,200 pounds (15,500 kg). It is classified as a type III iron meteorite, being composed of over 91% iron and 7.62% nickel, with traces of cobalt and phosphorus. The approximate dimensions of the meteorite are 10 feet (3 m) tall by 6.5 feet (2 m) wide by 4.25 feet (1.3 m) deep. Most iron meteorites like Willamette have originated from the differentiated core of planetesimals or asteroids that collided with another object. Willamette has a recrystallized structure with only traces of a medium Widmanstätten pattern; the result of a significant impact-heating event on the parent body. The Willamette Meteorite contains higher concentrations of various metals that are quite rare in Earth's crust. For example, iridium, one of the least abundant elements in Earth's crust, is found in the Willamette Meteorite at a concentration of 4.7 ppm, thousands of times more concentrated than in the Earth's crust.

== Emplacement and erosion ==
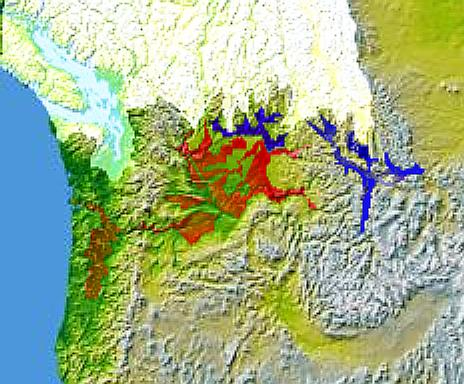
Glacial Lake Columbia (west) and Glacial Lake Missoula (east, in blue) were south of Cordilleran Ice Sheet. The areas inundated in the Columbia and Missoula Floods are shown in red. The meteorite was rafted by the floods embedded inside an ice block.

The lack of an impact crater at the discovery site was only explained after the 1920s, with the new understanding about the Missoula Floods, one of the largest floods documented. These floods were caused by the collapse of an ice barrier during the last deglaciation.

The meteorite presumably landed on an ice cap in what is now Montana or western Canada, and was dragged by the glacier ice to the vicinity of an ice barrier that formed across the Clark Fork River. This barrier had ponded a huge amount of water at Lake Missoula right at the time when the meteorite reached the area and the ice barrier became unstable and was breached. The resulting flood involved up to 10 million cubic metres (350 million cubic feet) per second of water discharge, with large blocks of ice rafting down the Columbia River and the Willamette Valley at the end of the last Ice Age (~13,000 years ago). Some of these ice rafts included boulders (known as 'glacial erratic' by geologists) like the Willamette meteorite, which eventually sank in the flood waters and settled where they were found by humans.

The deep crevasses of the meteorite resulted from both its high-speed atmospheric entry and its subsequent weathering. Exposed to the elements for thousands of years, rainwater interacted with the mineral troilite, resulting in a form of sulfuric acid which slowly dissolved portions of the meteorite. This resulted in the gradual development of the hollows that are visible today.

== Modern history ==
In 1902, Ellis Hughes was the first European settler to recognize the meteorite's significance. At that time, the land was owned by the Oregon Iron and Steel Company. Hughes attempted to claim ownership of the meteorite, and secretly moved it to his own land. This involved 90 days of hard work to cover the 3/4 mile (1,200 m) distance. The move was discovered, and after a lawsuit, the Oregon Supreme Court held that Oregon Iron and Steel Company was the legal owner. According to Native American witness who testified in defense of Hughes at the trial, the meteorite had already been owned by their ancestors long before Hughes found it on the neighboring property, and that being sent up the hill to the stone on dark nights had been a rite of passage for young men of their culture, while their warriors would seek success in battle by dipping their arrows into rainwater collected in the stone's hollows.

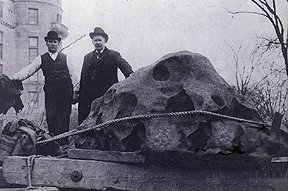
Willamette Meteorite in the early 20th century

In 1905, Sarah Tappan Hoadley, wife of William E. Dodge Jr., purchased the meteorite for $26,000 ($931,667 in 2025). After displaying it at the Lewis and Clark Centennial Exposition, she donated it to the American Museum of Natural History in New York City, where it has been on display since 1906.

In 1998, museum curators cut a 28-pound (13 kg) section from the crown of the meteorite. That section was traded to a private collector for a one-half-ounce (14 g) piece of a Martian meteorite.

In 1999, the Confederated Tribes of the Grand Ronde Community of Oregon (CTGR), a confederation of Native American tribes, demanded that it be returned and filed an action pursuant to the Native American Graves Protection and Repatriation Act (NAGPRA) against the American Museum of Natural History. In response, the Museum filed a federal lawsuit seeking a declaratory judgment against the CTGR in 2000. An agreement with the Museum was reached later that year in which the meteorite would remain at the museum with tribal members being able to conduct a private ceremony around the meteorite once a year, and that ownership will be transferred to CTGR should the museum cease to have the meteorite on display.

In 2006, a 4.5-ounce (130 g), 7.5-inch (19 cm) piece of the meteorite, derived from the above noted crown section, was purchased at auction and was displayed at the Evergreen Aviation & Space Museum in McMinnville, Oregon, until it was returned to the CTGR on February 22, 2019.

In early 2007, in response to a student's request, Representative John Lim introduced a resolution that would demand that the museum return the meteorite to Oregon. The tribes said they were not consulted, they did not support the resolution, and were content with the current arrangement with the museum.

In October 2007, plans to auction the crown section led to claims by the CTGR of insensitivity. Bidders dropped out when an editorial in the Portland Oregonian newspaper asserted the CTGR would file a lawsuit against the new owner, but the CTGR disavowed the editorial and said they had no such intent, and that they could not stop the sale. While the newspaper printed an apology, the specimen was withdrawn. A lawsuit was filed against the newspaper in Oregon Circuit Court and failed.

== Mass ==
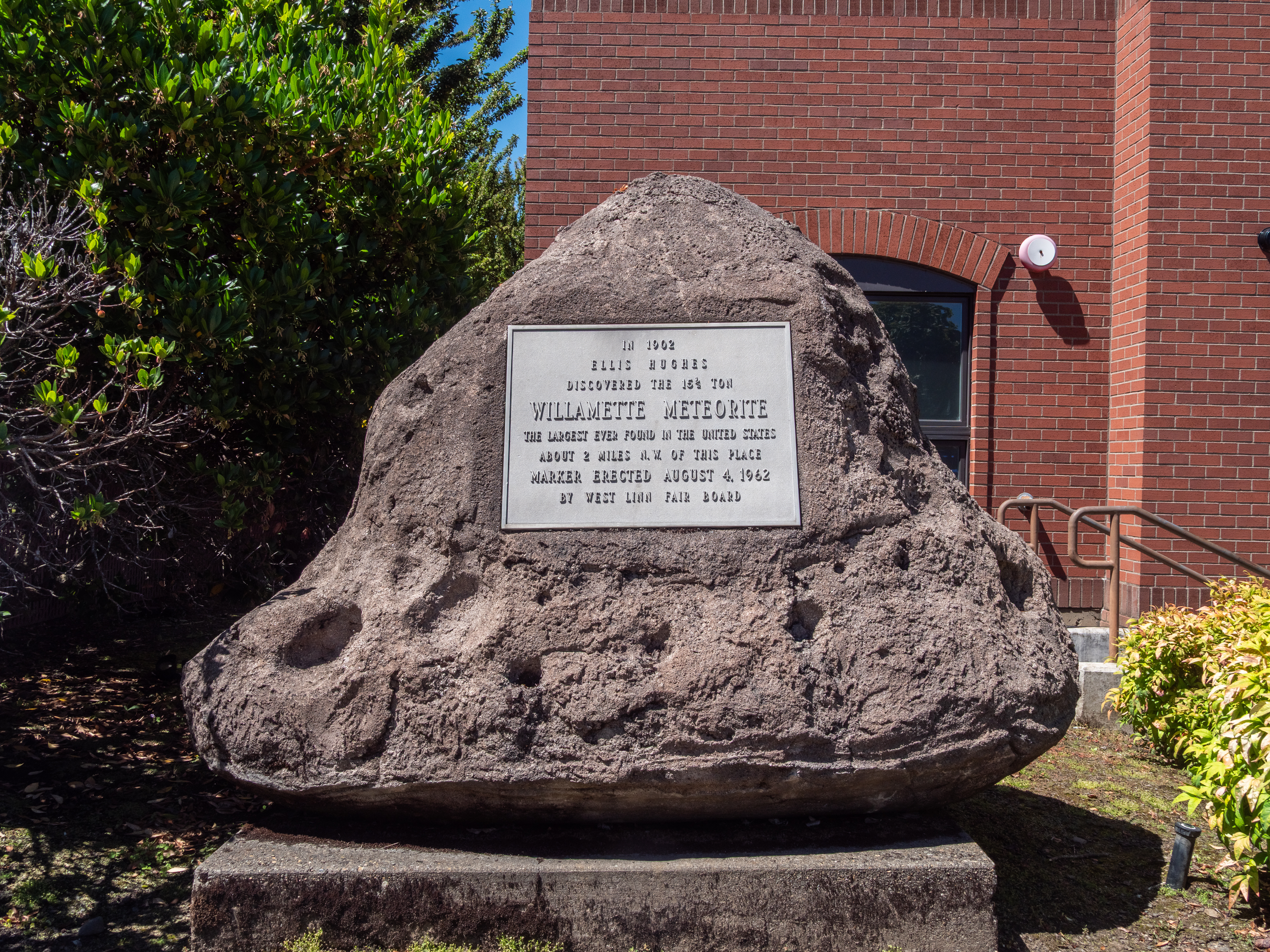
A historical marker in the Willamette area of West Linn, Oregon. The plaque reads: "In 1902 Ellis Hughes discovered the 15 1/2 ton Willamette Meteorite, the largest ever found in the United States, about 2 miles N.W. of this place. Marker erected August 4, 1962 by West Linn Fair Board."

Different sources report different weights of the Willamette Meteorite, ranging from 15,500 kilograms (34,200 lb) to 12,700 kilograms (28,000 lb). Circa 2008, pages of the American Museum of Natural History website stated both "15.5 tons" and "14 tons". There are differences between the metric ton (1,000 kilograms, 2,204.6 lb), short ton (2,000 pounds, 907.18 kg), and long ton (2,240 pounds, 1,016.0 kg), each of which may simply be called a "ton". In 1906, the American Museum of Natural History stated that the weight of the meteorite was "at least 31,200 pounds, or about 15.6 tons", consistent with American usage of "ton" usually meaning the short ton. As of 2023, the American Museum of Natural History website gives the weight as "15.5 tons".

== Replicas ==
An inexact replica, known as Brown and Black Asteroid, is on display in Eugene, Oregon, outside the University of Oregon Museum of Natural and Cultural History on the University of Oregon campus.

A one-fifth-size replica stands in Fields Bridge Park in West Linn, Oregon.

The only exact replica of the meteorite was created circa 2018 by Garrick Imatani, an artist and assistant professor at Southern Oregon University, through a process involving photogrammetry of the original at the American Museum of Natural History, via cooperation with the CTGR, and 3D printing. Imatani also created an interpretation of the meteorite that is on permanent display at the University of Oregon in Straub Hall.

== See also ==
- Glossary of meteoritics
- List of largest meteorites on Earth
- List of individual rocks
