= Western Stemmed Tradition =

North American archaeological culture from 13,000-8,500 YBP

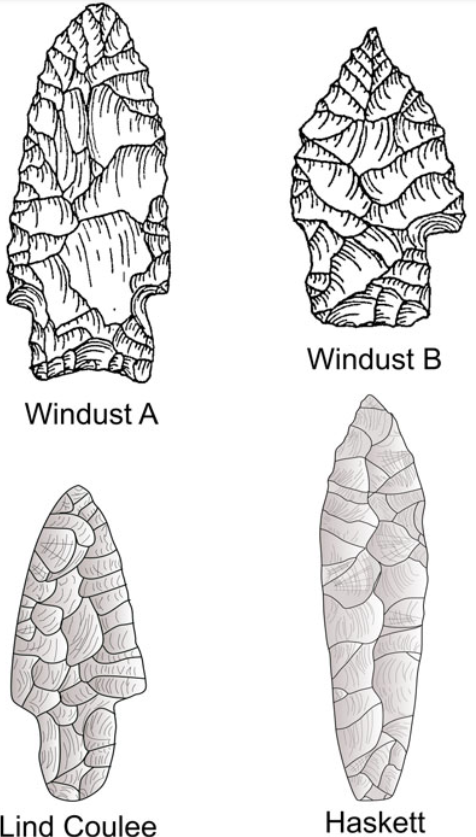
Examples of Western Stemmed Tradition projectile points

The Western Stemmed Tradition (WST) is a Paleoindian archaeological culture known from the Intermountain West of North America, particularly the Great Basin and the Columbian Plateau, spanning from over 13,000 years Before Present (and thus overlapping with the more well-known Clovis culture) to around 8,500 years Before Present. Unlike Clovis and related traditions, the stone projectile points produced by the Western Stemmed Tradition are unfluted (lacking flakes removed at the base). Other types of tool produced by WST peoples include stone crescents. The Western Stemmed Tradition has a wide variability in tool morphology, and is divided up into a number of chronologically separated subtypes, including Haskett (~12,600-11,500 years BP), Cougar Mountain (Great Basin, 11,700-9,000 years BP), Lind Coulee (Columbia Plateau, 12,000-11,200 years BP, named after Lind Coulee Archaeological Site) Parman (Great Basin 11,300-9,000 years BP) Silver Lake (Great Basin, 11,000-9,850 BP) and Windust (11,300-8,500 years BP, named after Windust Caves). Some of the oldest sites of the tradition are at Cooper's Ferry in Idaho and Paisley Cave in Oregon, dating to the Bølling–Allerød Interstadial, as early as 13,500 BP at Cooper’s Ferry. Pre-Clovis stemmed points are also known from the Debra L. Friedkin and Gault sites in Texas, perhaps dating as early as 14,500 BP, though these are outside the core distribution area of the WST.

WST type points include both stemmed (those with a basal section narrower than the main body of the point) as well as lanceolate forms. The points were manufactured from a variety of core types primarily using percussion flaking, with pressure flaking also being utilized. These points were likely multifunctional, also serving as cutting tools and knives.

WST-type tools are most often found around current or former lakes and wetlands, though they have also been found in other environments like deltas, caves, rockshelters and canyons.

WST peoples are suggested to have produced textiles and rope based on finds in caves associated with WST-type tools, and are also suggested to have produced rock art, and traded with coastal peoples for marine shell beads. Unlike the Clovis culture, which are suggested to have been specialised mobile big-game hunters, WST peoples (with perhaps the exception of the Haskett, which have lanceolate points) are suggested to have been generalists, consuming a wide variety of different kinds of foods. Evidence from Paisely cave suggests that WST peoples consumed animals like pronghorn, bighorn sheep, mule deer, jackrabbits and sage grouse, as well as crickets, alongside consuming various plant foods.

Finds at other sites like Connley Caves in Oregon, and Old River Bed in Utah, suggest the hunting of bison, mule deer, rabbits, waterfowl and fish. The Buhl Woman, a woman found buried in southern Idaho with a ceremonial WST-style tool (most similar to Parman-type), had a diet with a significant component of fish as evidenced by isotopic analysis.
