= Lower Salmon River Archeological District =

- U.S. National Register of Historic Places
- U.S. Historic district
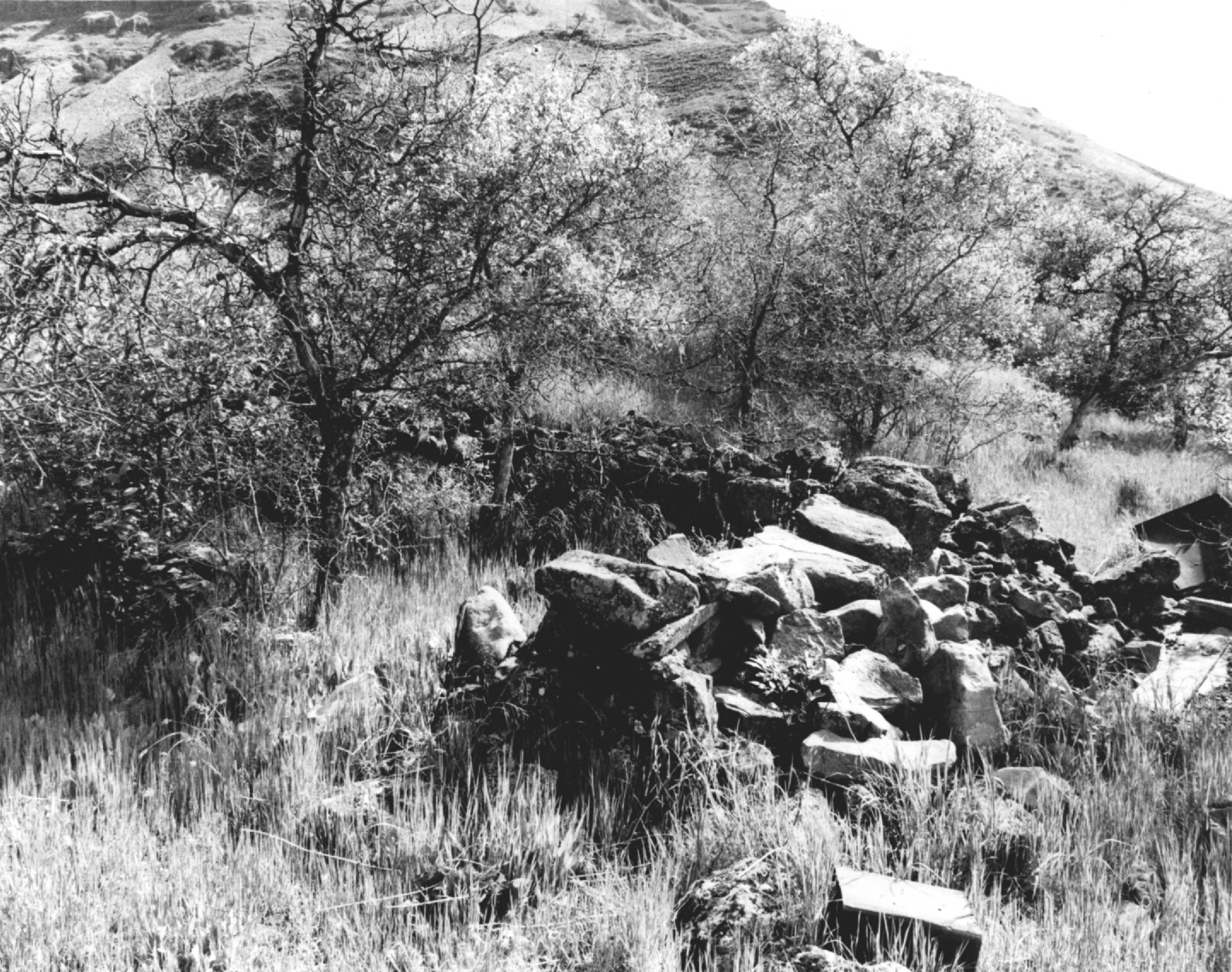
- Nearest city: Winchester, Idaho
- Area: 4,818 acres (19.50 km^{2})
- NRHP reference No.: 86002170
- Added to NRHP: September 4, 1986

The Lower Salmon River Archeological District is a 4,818 acres (19.50 km^{2}) historic district listed on the National Register of Historic Places in 1986. It included 213 contributing sites.

The district spans across parts of Idaho County, Lewis County and Nez Perce County counties of Idaho. It extends along 51 miles (82 km) of the lower Salmon River.

Archeological studies were conducted in the area during 1961 to 1964 by the Idaho State College Museum, and by other entities at later dates.

This area includes the Cooper's Ferry site.
