= Brown and Black Asteroid =

Sculpture in Eugene, Oregon, U.S.

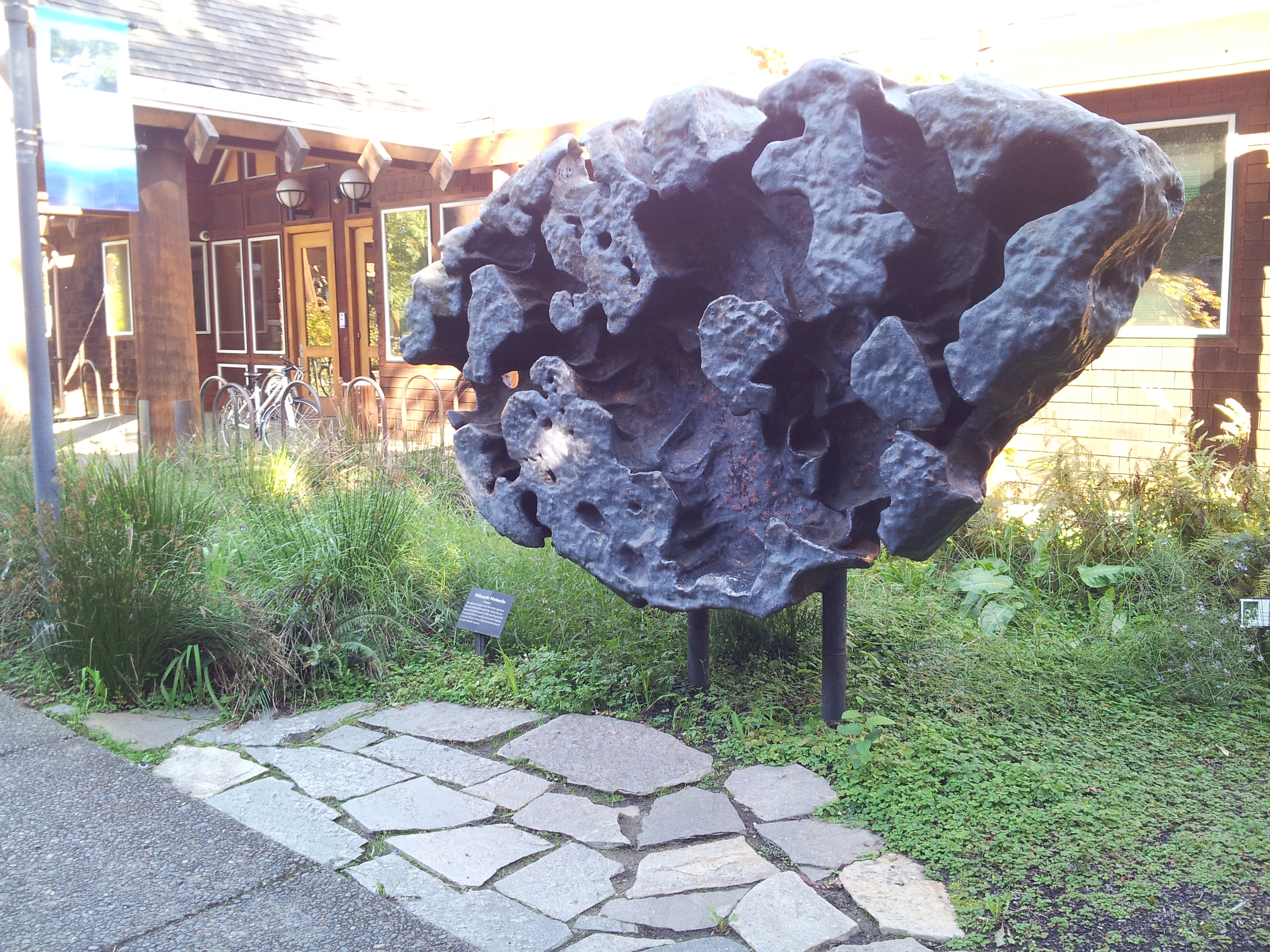
- The meteorite replica in 2015
- Type: Sculpture
- Medium: Wire mesh; fiberglass; resin
- Subject: Willamette Meteorite
- Dimensions: 17 cm × 30 cm × 13 cm (6.5 in × 12 in × 5 in)
- Condition: "Treatment needed" (1994)
- Location: University of Oregon Museum of Natural and Cultural History, Eugene, Oregon, United States; 44.04291°N 123.06840°W
- Owner: University of Oregon

Brown and Black Asteroid is an outdoor sculpture and replica of the Willamette Meteorite by an unknown artist, installed outside the University of Oregon Museum of Natural and Cultural History in Eugene, Oregon, in the United States.

== Description ==
The Smithsonian Institution, which surveyed the work as part of its "Save Outdoor Sculpture!" program in 1994, suggests the sculpture is made of wire mesh, fiberglass, and resin. It measures approximately 6.5 feet (2.0 m) x 12 feet (3.7 m) x 5 feet (1.5 m) and is supported by a base of metal pipes, each of which are approximately 2 feet (0.61 m) tall and have a diameter of 4 inches (10 cm). Smithsonian considers the work abstract and deemed its condition "treatment needed" the year it was surveyed. It is administered by the University of Oregon.
