= Pleistocene human diet =

The diet of known human ancestors varies dramatically over time. Strictly speaking, according to evolutionary anthropologists and archaeologists, there is not a single hominin Paleolithic diet. The Paleolithic covers roughly 2.8 million years, concurrent with the Pleistocene, and includes multiple human ancestors with their own evolutionary and technological adaptations living in a wide variety of environments. This fact with the difficulty of finding conclusive evidence often makes broad generalizations of the earlier human diets very difficult. Humans' pre-hominin primate ancestors were broadly herbivorous, relying on either foliage or fruits and nuts and the shift in dietary breadth during the Paleolithic is often considered a critical point in hominin evolution. A generalization between Paleolithic diets of the various human ancestors that many anthropologists do make is that they are all to one degree or another omnivorous and are inextricably linked with tool use and new technologies.

== Background ==
Hominin timeline
← / Earlier apes; ← / Gorilla split; ← / Chimpanzee split; ← / Earliest bipedal; ← / Earliest sign of Ardipithecus; ← / Earliest sign of Australopithecus; ← / Earliest stone tools; ← / Earliest sign of Homo; ← / Dispersal beyond Africa; ← / Earliest fire / cooking; ← / Earliest rock art; ← / Earliest clothes; ← / Modern humans
(million years ago)

Due to the variety of environments inhabited, physiologies of the humans and human ancestors alive during the Paleolithic over 2.8 million years, we cannot ascribe a single set diet to any species, regional or cultural group. Larger brain sizes required a greater caloric intake. In colder climates meat might be necessary due to the decreased availability of plant based foods, and in hotter tropical climates a wider range of plants would be available.

== Evolution of hominins ==
Recent estimates of the last common ancestors of humans and chimpanzees are around 12 million years ago. After this split the first bipedal hominins appeared around 4 million years ago in the genus Australopithecus. The first appearance of genus Homo takes place around 2.8 million years ago with Homo habilis, followed by Homo erectus at around 1.8 million years ago, Homo neanderthalensis by 400,000 years ago and finally the first appearance of Homo sapiens by 200,000 years ago. In each new species of hominin, particularly genus Homo there is a general trend of increasing brain size and decreasing dentition, these patterns are inextricably linked with an evolving diet.

== Lines of evidence to uncover the diet of human ancestors ==
There are numerous difficulties in detecting and understanding the ancient diet of human ancestors. The Paleolithic begins around 2.6 million years ago and ends only around 12,000 years ago with the onset of the Holocene and Neolithic. The enormous time scale, variable environments inhabited by human ancestors and issues with preservation ensure that direct evidence is often very difficult to come by.

Evolutionary anthropologists who study the evolution of human origins and diet use a variety of methods to determine what human ancestors ate. As a starting point comparative analysis of the diets of humans closest living relatives, great apes such as chimpanzees, bonobos and other great apes, though these comparison are limited. Through environmental reconstruction of the areas ancient humans lived, inferences of available resources can be made. A common method of analysis is through the study of dentition and toothwear, as different foods will leave different markers that can be studied. There is also direct archaeological evidence, different types of tools would be used to process and consume different types of food and often be associated with faunal remains and evidence of fire. Human coprolites can also reflect direct evidence of diet.

More recent techniques have been introduced such as carbon isotopic analysis of recovered bones, which can be used as direct evidence of diet, and life history traits. An example would be the expensive tissue hypothesis, linking a decrease in gut size with an increase in brain size. Recently genetic studies of differences between Homo sapiens and other related hominins to determine adaptations related to diet.

== Hominin diet before the Paleolithic ==
Generally speaking, inferring feeding adaptations in fossil hominins is not a simple task, and hence diet reconstructions have relied on diverse techniques (e.g. microwear, stable isotopes, functional morphology, etc.) that have provided different or even contradictory results. The direct predecessors to genus Homo, Australopithecus are thought to have broadly been frugivores or herbivores. The dental and jaw morphology of Australopithecus afarensis have often been assumed to indicate a diet of harder brittle foods, however tooth wear analysis from some specimen reflect a diet of tough grasses and leaves. This is corroborated by stable carbon isotopic evidence indicating the consumption of plants found along riversides and under tree cover. A recent study that analysed several hominin taxa has shown that they were probably not hard-food specialists, most likely relying on a softer diet.

== Homo naledi, Homo habilis, Homo floresiensis and Homo erectus ==
=== Homo naledi ===
Almost half of H. naledi teeth have one or more chips on the enamel surface, caused by teeth coming into contact with hard foods or environmental grit during life. These antemortem enamel fractures are predominantly small and on the surfaces between molars, suggesting either a small hard dietary item was commonly consumed, or, more likely, environmental grit was incorporated into their diet when eating foods such as tubers. Two other studies support the suggestion that H. naledi consumed large quantities of small hard objects, most likely in the form of dust or grit. Crown shape supports this finding, with taller crowned and more wear resistant molars, potentially evolving to protect against abrasive particles. Microwear on the molars of H. naledi also suggests they regularly consumed hard and abrasive items. Overall, it is likely H. naledi differed substantially from other African fossil hominins in terms of diet, behaviour, or masticatory processing.

=== Homo habilis ===
By 3 million years ago the broad pattern of human dentition was in place with reduced canines and a jaw morphology implying heavier chewing. Stone tools and butchered animal remains dating to 2.6 million years ago have been found together in Ethiopia. This finding provides both the clearest evidence of meat eating by early human ancestors and the association of earliest stone tools with the butchering of animals for meat and marrow. This co-occurrence of stone tools is clearly linked with the butchering of animals and earliest identifiable appearances of Homo habilis. Tooth wear from Homo habilis indicates a relative lack of hard foods such as nuts, tubers or other hard brittle plant material being consumed. This is not to say that no tougher foods were eaten by H. habilis, only that it was likely not a regular part of the diet. By contrast, Homo erectus teeth generally reflect a much higher degree of wear, indicating tougher plant foods being eaten. While likely able to consume a variety of plant and animal resources, it seems that H. habilis was not able to exploit the wide array of resources and ecological niches its descendants would be able to.

=== Homo erectus ===
In contrast to Homo habilis, H. erectus left its ancestral environment of Africa and spread through much of the old world. Homo erectus appears to have avoided other large predators. Several interpretations of Homo erectus diet have been made, usually contrasting between primarily plant based foragers and scavengers or opportunistic hunters. However, as H. erectus dispersed across Eurasia some behaviors in some areas appear to have changed. The trajectory of diets between Homo habilis and Homo erectus can be described as a diversification of diet as Homo erectus spread within Africa and beyond into Asia. Meat played a critical role in the evolution of H. habilis, but as Homo erectus evolved the diet broadened to include tougher foods that H. habilis did not consume regularly. A broad diet alone however is not Homo erectus' sole contribution to evolution of the human lineage. Genetic evidence of reduced jaw muscles implies the adoption of cooking by humans prior to the branching of H. sapiens and H. neanderthalensis, placing the first use of fire for cooking firmly during the time of Homo erectus. Fire presents clear advantages to a species diet, in that cooking allows a greater range of foods to be eaten and improves the caloric content of both animal protein and plants. Another hypothesis is that H. erectus used tools to slice up their food even before they started to cook it, making it easier to chew.

=== Homo floresiensis ===
Homo floresiensis is thought to have diverged from humanity's ancestral branch prior to the evolution of Homo erectus. The direct ancestor of Homo floresiensis is currently thought to be Homo habilis, but this is subject to change with new information. Tooth wear from Homo floresiensis implies a tough, fibrous diet requiring powerful mastication. There is some evidence of meat eating associated with Homo floresiensis, but current evidence indicated that a plant based diet dominated. The specific plant species available to H. floresiensis is currently unknown. This complicates H. floresiensis relationship to H habilis, due to the latter’s association with intensive meat eating diet. That being the case, more than enough time passed for H. floresiensis diet to specialize to its given environment.

== Homo heidelbergensis and Homo neanderthalensis ==
=== Homo heidelbergensis ===
Homo heidelbergensis, the likely predecessor of Homo neanderthalensis, has few direct clues to its diet. Two adult incisors, likely from H. heidelbergensis have been found in England in an environment that at death would have been a spring fed wetland. The teeth themselves are heavily worn, implying heavy wear in the individual’s diet. Wooden spears dating to between 380,000 and 400,000 years BP were found in Germany, indicating that H. heidelbergensis was a big game hunter with sophisticated technology.

=== Homo neanderthalensis ===
Neanderthals were almost certainly effective hunters. Multiple sites associated with H. neanderthalensis also have the remains of butchered animals. More direct stable isotope evidence from Neanderthal bodies also indicates a heavy, though by no means exclusive reliance on animal protein. The degree to which Neanderthals rely on meat in their diet is extensively debated with contradictory evidence found often at very similar sites. Worn teeth from Neanderthal remains at a variety of sites imply use of plant and other abrasive foods, while other researchers find that Neanderthal tooth wear in general indicates a varied diet of both plants and meat. There is clear evidence of the consumption and processing of ancestors of wheat and barley by Neanderthals from starch analysis of dental calculus, while in Belgium, a species related to Sorghum was consumed along with other unknown plants. At the site of Shanidar in Iraq, in addition to the ancestors of wheat and barley, Homo neanderthalensis is known to have consumed dates, legumes and a variety of other unknown plant species. In addition, evidence exists from the same teeth of Neanderthals to support the increased use of fire in their diet in addition to the wide variety of plant and animals in their diet. Evidence from Neanderthal coprolites from a Middle Paleolithic site in Spain support a diet of animal protein and plants at that site, though there is a lack of indicators for the consumption of starchy tubers. Neanderthals at El Sidron cave in Spain appear to have a more limited diet of meat when compared to other Neanderthal groups. In February 2019, scientists reported evidence, based on isotope studies, that at least some Neanderthals may have eaten meat. Nonetheless, instead of diet dominated by meat eating, the genetic and microbiological evidence from dental calculus implies reliance on mushrooms, pine nuts and a species of moss. The implications of this array of evidence is important due to the evidence that the “broad spectrum” of plant use is not unique to Homo sapiens. Homo neanderthalensis had, for all intents and purposes, a complex diet similar to many hunter-gather groups of Homo sapiens. The critical factor in this diet was that it varies significantly based on the local environment.

== Homo sapiens ==
The evidence of early Homo sapiens diet stems from multiple lines of evidence, and there is a relative abundance of information due to both a larger relative population footprint and more recent evidence. A key contribution to early human diet likely was the introduction of fire to hominins toolkit. Some studies indicate a correlation with the introduction of fire and the reduction of tooth and gut size, going so far as to indicate their reduction as clear evolutionary indicators of the widespread introduction of fire.

A key difference between the diets of Homo sapiens and our closest extinct relatives H. neanderthalensis is the ability to effectively digest cooked starches, with some evidence found linking cooked starch and a further increase in H. sapiens brain size. Roots and tubers were introduced into the broader human diet, and can likely be assumed to be associated with fire as cooking would likely be necessary for many tubers to be digested. The use of root and tuber species in some Hunter Gatherer cultures makes up a critical component of diet. This is not only for the nutritional value of the species, but the relative annual stability of the species. This buffer effect would be important for many groups that relied on tubers. In addition to the exploitation of tubers, another dietary innovation (this far) of Homo sapiens is the introduction of coastal and other marine resources. Some researchers have argued that the introduction of shellfish and other marine species play a significant role in the evolution of modern Homo sapiens.

By the Upper Paleolithic, more complex tools and a higher proportion of meat in the human diet are assumed to correlate with an expansion of population in Europe. Though the diet of modern humans is not consistent through the Upper Paleolithic, from the Middle to Late Pleistocene there is a general shift in many areas towards a less abrasive diet. This is accompanied by changing technologies that would aid in the processing of abrasive plant species. Ethnographic comparisons with contemporary groups of Hunter Gatherers broadly imply a high reliance on animal protein supplemented with a wide range of available plant foods. While a reliance on animal protein is often seen as typical, it is by no means universal.

By the time of the Upper Paleolithic and modern Homo sapiens, not only was a wide variety of plants consumed, but a wide variety of animals, snails and fish. In order to exploit the many different species consumed, there was a wider variety of tools made than ever before available to humans. The shift to a higher quality diet and the technology to process a wide array of foods is reflected in modern humans by both the relatively larger brain size and reduction in gut size. The trend of larger brain size, the eating of animal protein, fire use and diversification of exploited foods is key to understanding the changing diets of human ancestors.

== Cannibalism ==
=== Nutritional value of the human body ===
Archaeologist James Cole investigated the nutritional value of the human body and found it to be similar to that of animals of similar size. He notes that, according to ethnographic and archaeological records, nearly all edible parts of humans were sometimes eaten – not only skeletal muscle tissue ("flesh" or "meat" in a narrow sense), but also "lungs, liver, brain, heart, nervous tissue, bone marrow, genitalia and skin", as well as kidneys. For a typical adult man, the combined nutritional value of all these edible parts is about 126,000 kilocalories (kcal). The nutritional value of women and younger individuals is lower because of their lower body weight – for example, around 86% of a male adult for an adult woman and 30% for a boy aged around 5 or 6.

As the daily energy need of an adult man is about 2,400 kilocalories, a dead male body could thus have fed a group of 25 men for a bit more than two days, provided they ate nothing but the human flesh alone – longer if it was part of a mixed diet. The nutritional value of the human body is thus not insubstantial, though Cole notes that for prehistoric hunters, large megafauna such as mammoths, rhinoceros, and bison would have been an even better deal as long as they were available and could be caught, because of their much higher body weight.

=== Archeological and historical evidence ===
Debates over the frequency of cannibalism in ancient humanity have been sporadic, usually erupting on the discovery of humans with cut and break marks reflective of being processed as food. Many theories of cannibalism amongst humans rely on a lack of available prey, crowding and fears of potential starvation. There are clear biological drawbacks of cannibalism including disease, and in addition instances of ritual cannibalism that have nothing to do with nutrition drawn from the ethnographic record.

The oldest firm evidence of Homo eating other hominins comes from cut marks on bones uncovered in Turkana, Kenya from 1.45 million years ago, and is a plausible early case of cannibalism. However, at this time and place multiple species of hominins coexisted, so it is not certain that this specific incident was undertaken by the same species. Cannibalism by Homo antecessor has also been uncovered, and it has been suggested to possibly have been a strategy employed against rival groups, though H. antecessor is a relative rather than an ancestor of Neanderthals and modern humans.

Evidence of cannibalism in the Pleistocene has also been firmly tied to both Homo sapiens and Homo neanderthalensis. Extensive evidence from Human bones that have been "de-fleshed" by other humans dates back over 600,000 years, including the first H. sapiens bones from Ethiopia. For instance in humans, the Magdalenian culture practiced the consumption of deceased relatives as a ritual funerary practice, and also appear to have used skull cups. Similarly, conclusive evidence amongst Neanderthals from remains in Belgium features cracked bones, cut marks and other indicators of processing for food. Some bones were then modified into bone tools. Notably, reindeer remains from the same site have the same types of butcher marks. The degree to which these remains reflect a ritual behavior, regular diet or isolated instances of dietary distress is not known.

Cannibalism continued after the end of the Paleolithic, as shown by hunter-gatherers of the Mediterranean Mesolithic from 10,200–9,000 years ago, who would have still had a relatively similar lifestyle. Bones uncovered in Castell de Castells, Spain show marks of human teeth gnawing on them. Nineteen of these bones also show burns from cooking, apparently after the meat was removed, but prior to the bones being broken down. Furthermore, human feces uncovered inside the cave contained fragments of human bones.

== Neolithic adaptations ==
The evolution of the human diet has not stopped since the end of the Paleolithic. Major functional adaptations have arisen in the last few thousand years as human technology has altered the environment. The most prevalent dietary adaptation since the Neolithic is lactase persistence, an adaptation that allows humans to digest milk. This adaptation appears roughly 4000 years ago in Europe. For populations more dependent on agriculture and domesticated animals, the importance of being able to add another edible resource should be noted.

== General trends ==
Many specifics of the evolution of the human diet change regularly as new research and lines of evidence become available. Through the Paleolithic across the last 2.8 million years there has been a pattern of human and human ancestors' biology adapting to an additionally available food source with resulting greater brain size, with the subsequent broadening and diversification of human diet. Homo habilis incorporated larger amounts of animal protein and fat into its diet, then as Homo erectus evolved it increased the breadth of its diet through fire and more advanced tool use. Homo sapiens in turn evolved the ability to consume cooked starch and marine life, which led to a further increase in brain size then greater technological diversification that ultimately allowed modern humans to adapt to a wide variety of ecological niches. The initial technological and biological adaptations each have knock on effects that allow a greater range of species to be used as food. This culminates in the Neolithic when suites of plants and animals are ultimately domesticated.
