= Chipped-stone crescent =

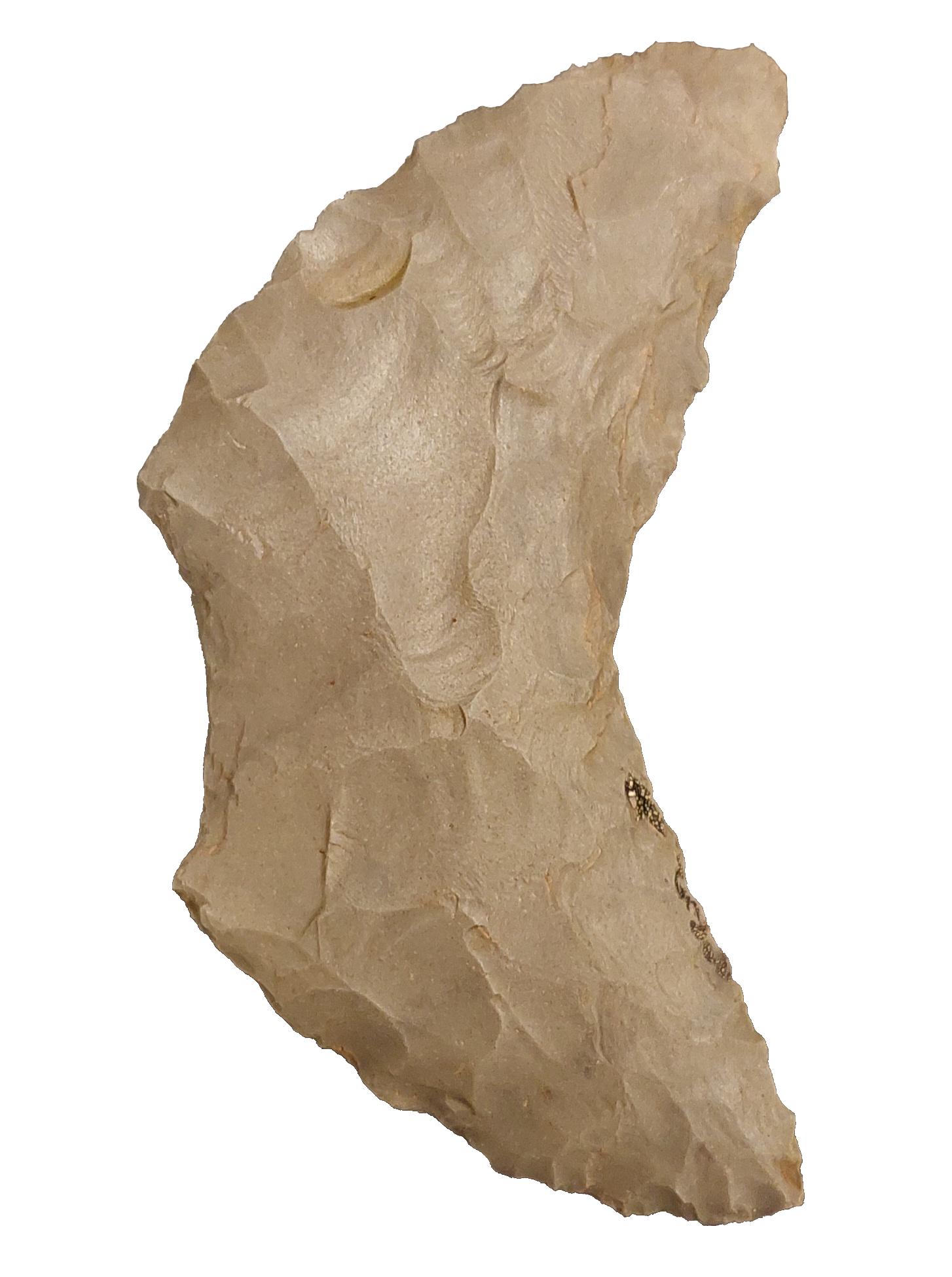
A lithic chipped-stone crescent tool.

Chipped stone crescents are a class of artifact found mainly associated with surface components of archaeological sites located in the Great Basin, the Columbia Plateau, and throughout California. Although their distribution covers a large portion of the western United States, crescents are often found in similar contexts in close proximity to water sources including playas, lakes, rivers, and mainland and island coast lines. Crescents are generally thought to be diagnostic to the terminal Pleistocene and early Holocene (approx. 12,000–8,000 years before present [YBP]) and are representative of assemblages that include fluted and stemmed projectile points.

The exact purpose of crescents is unknown, but scientists suggest they may have been hafted as a projectile point, or used as part of a throwing stick.

== Crescent morphology ==
Crescents are a type of artifact or group of artifacts that are somewhat morphologically diverse, but typically consist of a chipped-stone tool that is bilaterally symmetrical, bifacially pressure flaked, may have winged edges, and typically have edge-grinding. Crescents are typically found as part of surface assemblages as opposed to well-dated subsurface contexts, and lack good chronology which would indicate if the degree of morphological variability represents changes over time, or if the differences represent regional expressions. Crescent morphology has been subdivided into three groups including lunate, winged, and eccentric crescents. Lunate crescents typically have a curved/convex proximal lateral edge with a generally straight to convex distal lateral edge. Winged crescents are characterized by convex proximal lateral edge and a concave distal lateral edge. Some eccentric crescents have been described as being shaped like animals such as bears, while others consist of serrated or barbed edges. The most common materials crescents are made of include chert, chalcedony, and jasper—all strong and durable lithic materials that are not as brittle as obsidian; however, although it's rare, some crescents are made of obsidian.

The Paleocoastal crescents have crafted bifaces. This is caused by heat through technological advances.

== Temporal and spatial distribution ==
Chipped-stone crescents are found within the western United States, primarily as part of surface assemblages throughout the Great Basin, the Columbia Plateau, and in California – primarily along the mainland and Channel Island coastlines, as well as the San Joaquin Valley and Mojave Desert. Crescents are associated with archaeological assemblages dating from the Terminal Pleistocene-to the Early Holocene (12,000-8,000 calibrated years before present [cal BP]) and tend to disappear from the archaeological record after 7,500 cal BP. Of the thousands of crescents documented to date in the western United States, approximately 94 percent of the sites in which they were discovered are within 10 kilometers of large existing or extinct bodies of water including wetlands, marches, rivers, and pluvial lakes.

In the Great Basin, crescents are often found in artifact assemblages characterized as belonging to the Western Stemmed Tradition (WST), which is composed of artifact classes that would indicate an economy focused on big-game hunting. These WST assemblages represent a timeframe spanning from approximately 12,000-8,500 cal BP, which spanned the Terminal Pleistocene and Early Holocenea period of cooler and wetter climate that supported hundreds of pluvial lakes throughout the Great Basin. Many WST assemblages are found on the remnant landforms of pluvial lakes; however, there are some that are found in caves far from known bodies of water.

In California, the known distribution of crescents extend along the coast from Sonoma County in the north to northern Baja in the south, in addition to inland settings in the southern San Joaquin Valley where crescents have been recovered along shorelines of extinct lakes. Approximately one-third of the crescents recovered from coastal California sites come from Santa Rosa and San Miguel islands. Though many crescents found on the islands are associated with surface artifact scatters, there are those that have been recovered from stratified subsurface deposits from which diagnostic artifacts, such as the Channel Island Barbed projectile point, as well as with faunal assemblages comprising waterfowl, seabirds, marine mammals, and fish.

Within the San Joaquin Valley, thousands of crescents have originated from sites located on the shoreline of Tulare Lake, which covered much of the southern portion of the valley. Similarly, crescent fragments have also been found in subsurface deposits dating to 7,600-8,200 cal BP associated with sites on the shoreline of extinct Buena Vista Lake, also located in the southern San Joaquin Valley.
