= Museum of Natural and Cultural History =

University of Oregon Museum of Natural and Cultural History
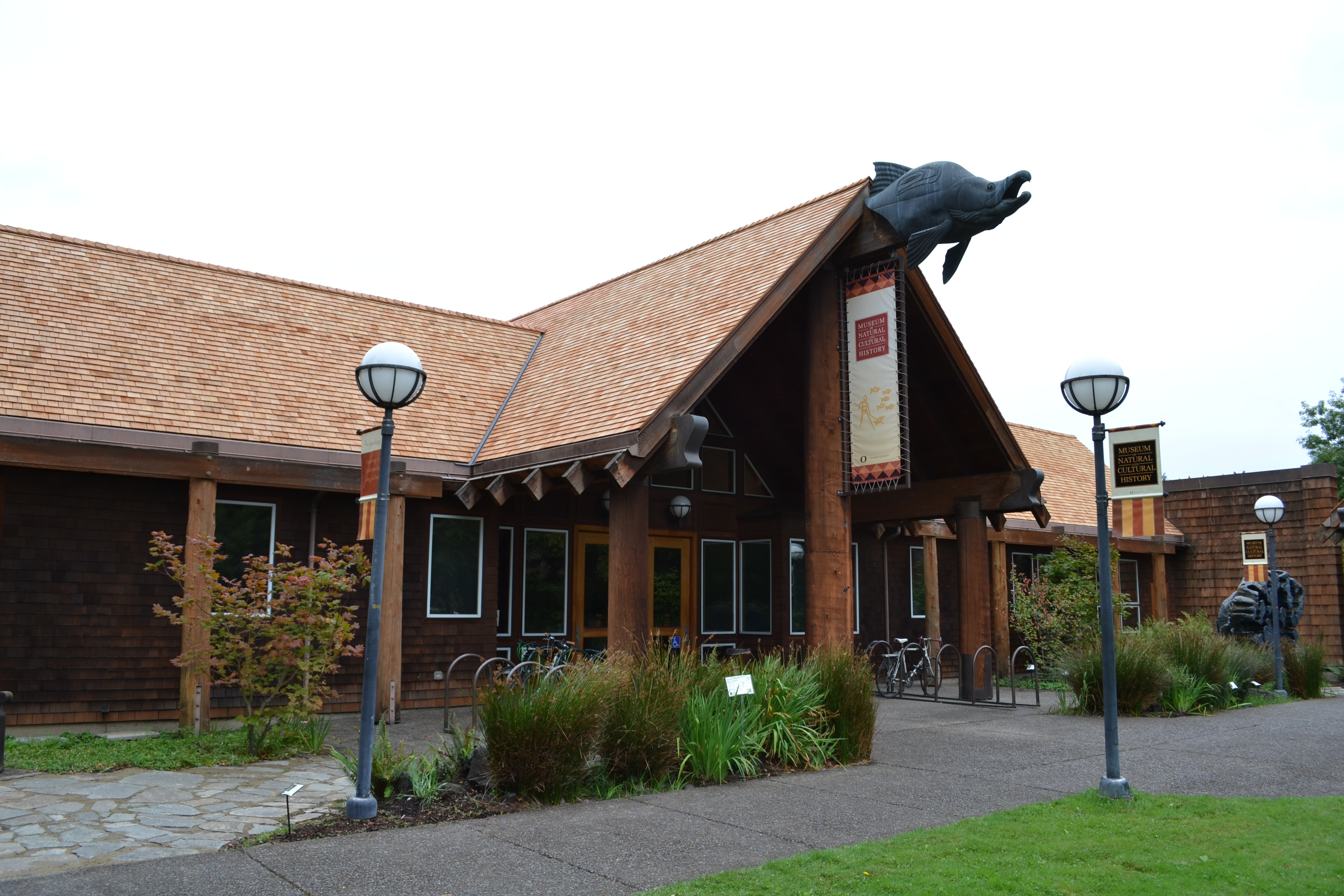

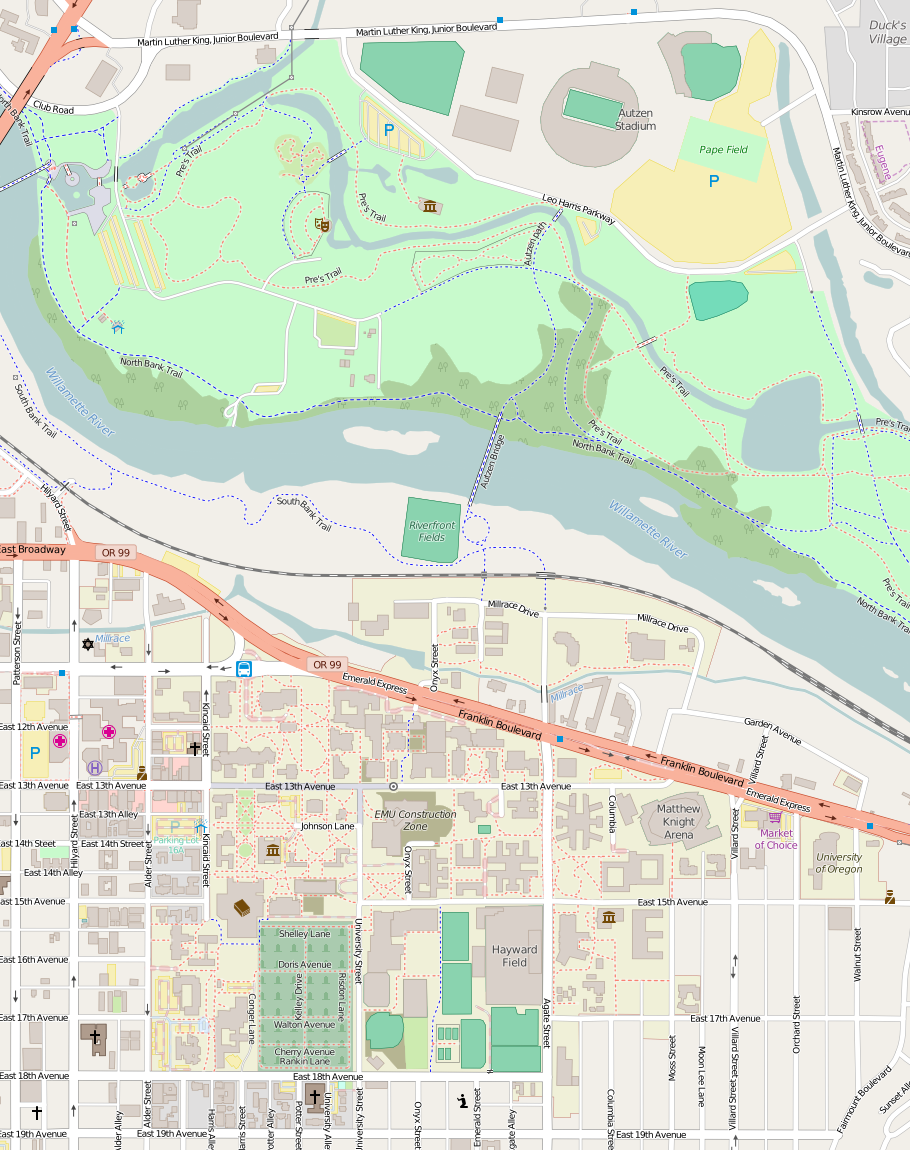
- Location within University of Oregon Campus
- Location: 1680 East 15th Eugene, Oregon
- Coordinates: 44.04298°N 123.068064°W
- Type: History museum
- Website: natural-history.uoregon.edu

The University of Oregon Museum of Natural and Cultural History is a natural history museum on the University of Oregon campus, in Eugene, Oregon, United States. The museum is in a building inspired by the design of Pacific Northwest Native longhouses.

== History ==
The museum traces its origins to the creation of the University of Oregon in 1876, when state geologist Thomas Condon was hired as one of the first three UO professors, bringing his extensive fossil collection with him. The Oregon State Legislative Assembly created the Oregon State Museum of Anthropology (OSMA) at the UO in 1935. Archaeologist Luther Cressman was the founding director. In 1936, the Condon Museum and State Museum of Anthropology were folded into the newly created UO Museum of Natural History, also directed by Luther Cressman.

== Collections ==
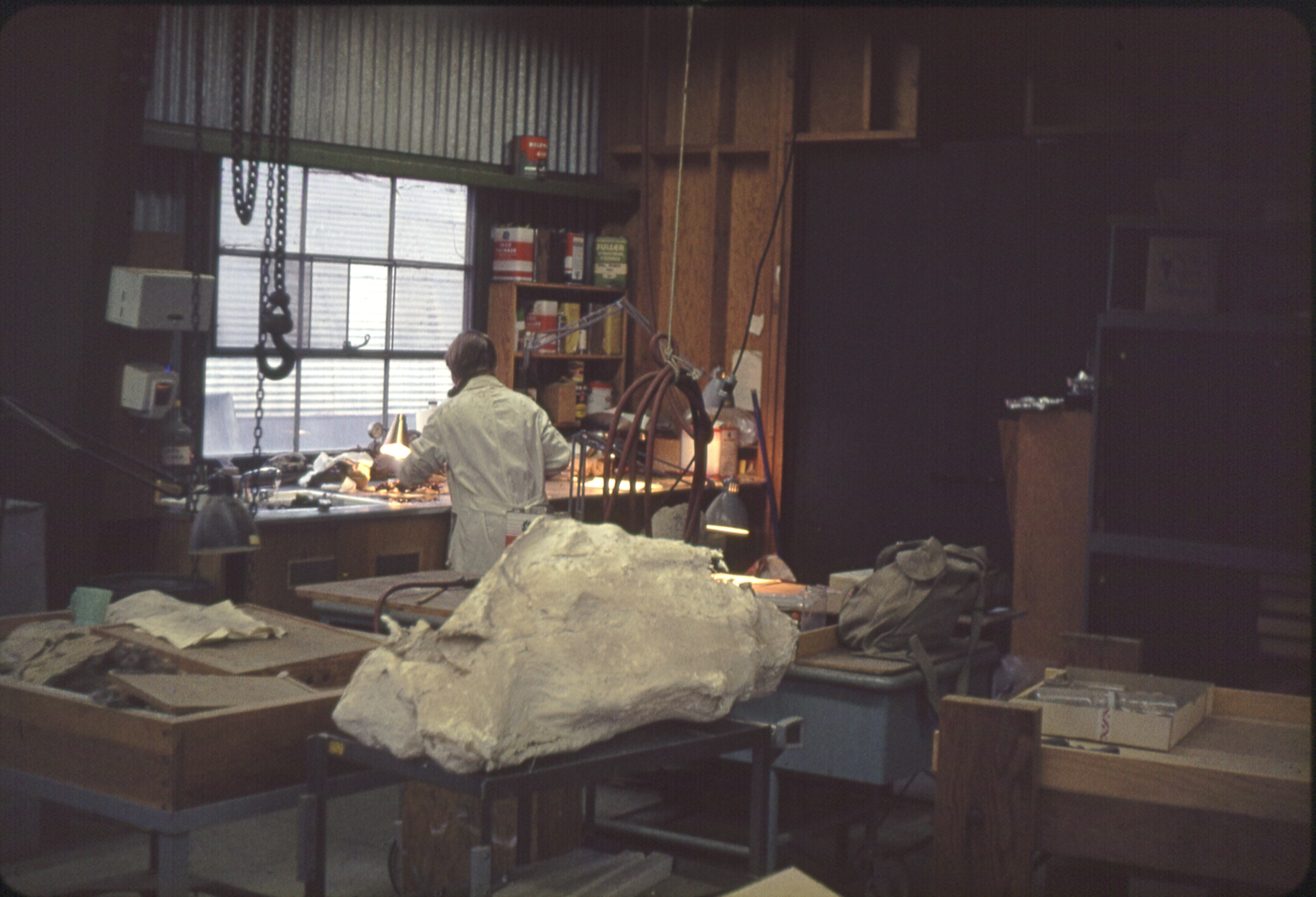
A laboratory in the museum in 1966

The museum has four divisions: the Condon Fossil Collection, the Archaeological Research Division (formerly known as OSMA), an Anthropological Collections division, and a Public Programs Division. The museum's collections include: nearly 100,000 fossils from Oregon, the Pacific Northwest, and around the world; nearly a million archaeological artifacts, including the famous Fort Rock sandals. that are among the oldest shoes in the world (~10,000 years old); extensive ethnographic collections from cultures worldwide, including over 1500 Native American baskets; and thousands of comparative specimens from modern or historical birds (and their eggs and nests), mammals, reptiles, marine and freshwater shells, and other organisms. The museum displays many of these artifacts, fossils, and objects in its exhibit halls, along with revolving exhibits highlighting the work of Pacific Northwest artists and other cultural and natural history themes. Surrounding the museum is a Native plant garden, a geological time line, and a replica of the Willamette Meteorite. The museum's new website also includes over 20 web galleries featuring objects from its collections.

The museum is the official repository for archaeological and paleontological collections from the state of Oregon and has a responsibility to preserve and interpret these materials in perpetuity. Museum staff members work closely with a variety of communities, from UO students and staff to thousands of K-12 students and teachers from the surrounding area, community members and volunteers, visiting researchers, and other visitors from around the world. Research and collections staff also collaborate with many local, state, and federal agencies and other institutions to conduct research and store collections for future research and interpretation. Tribal members worked closely with museum staff in designing exhibits and creating replicas for displays that highlight the deep history of Native American tribes in four geographic regions of Oregon: the Northwest Coast, Columbia Plateau, Great Basin, and Willamette Valley. The geological, paleontological, and natural history of the Pacific Northwest is also interpreted and illustrated with objects from the museum's collections. Museum research is also shared with the public through the University of Oregon Anthropological Papers series, which recently printed its 69th volume.
