= Hays Canyon Range =

Mountain range in Nevada, United States

- Location within Nevada

Highest point
- Peak: Hays Canyon Peak
- Elevation: 7920+ ft (2414+ m)
- Coordinates: 41°16′35″N 119°56′07″W

Dimensions
- Length: 40 mi (64 km) N-S
- Width: 10 mi (16 km)

Geography
- Country: United States
- State: Nevada
- Region(s): Black Rock Desert region (Great Basin)
- County: Washoe County
- Settlement: Cedarville, CA
- Borders on: Surprise Valley & Warner Mtns-W; Black Rock Desert-E; Buffalo Hills & Granite Range-SE; Middle Alkali Lake-W
- Topo map: USGS Hays Canyon

The Hays Canyon Range is a mountain range in northwest Washoe County, Nevada, adjacent the California border. The Surprise Valley with its alkali lakes and the Warner Mountains lie to the west.

== Description ==
The Hays Canyon Range is a mostly linear, north–south trending range, variable in width, about 40 mi long. The range overlooks the linear Surprise Valley to the west; high elevation dry lakes, above 5500 ft lie to the northeast. Crooks Lake lies in the north of the lower elevation section of the range.

The highpoint of the range is Hays Canyon Peak, 7,916 feet (2,413 m) at the extreme south of the range. Other peaks from north to south are:

Fortynine Mountain, 7,462 feet (2,274 m)
Big Hat Mountain, 6,854 feet (2,089 m)
Drag Road Canyon–Button Brush Flat
The Craters
Little Hat Mountain, 7,166 feet (2,184 m)
Divine Peak, 7,462 feet (2,274 m) (in east)
Hays Canyon Peak, 7,916 feet (2,413 m) (west of center)
Pegleg Canyon
Red Mountain, 6,974 feet (2,126 m)
