= Surprise Valley, Modoc County =

Valley in California, United States

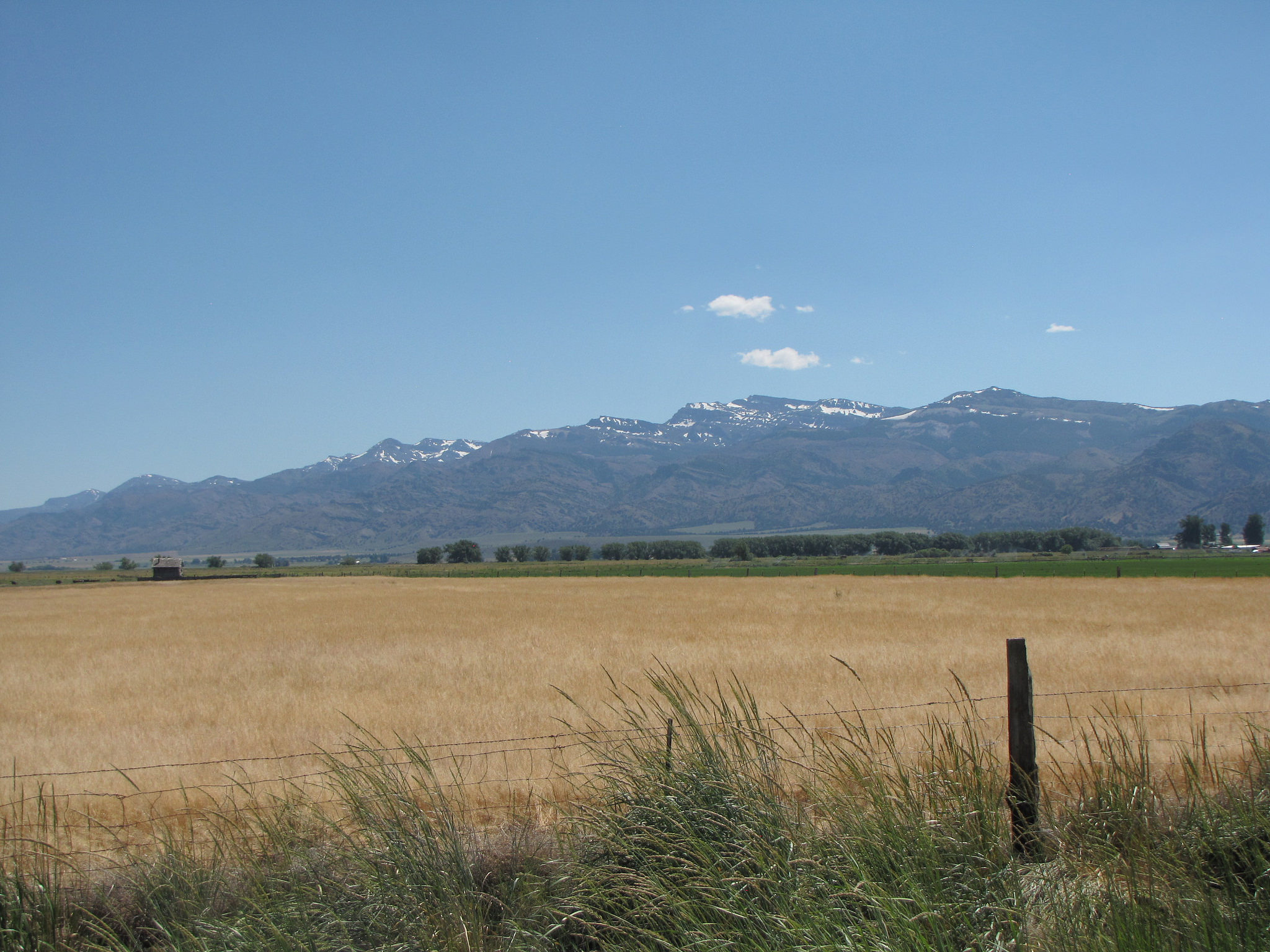

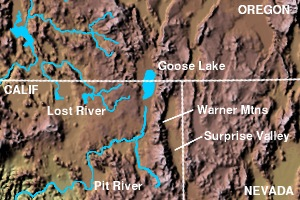
- Length: 60 mi (97 km)

Geography
- Location: Modoc County, California
- Population centers: Cedarville, Lake City, Fort Bidwell, Lake Annie, Eagleville
- Borders on: Warner Mountains-NW, W & SW; Hays Canyon Range-E & SE
- Coordinates: 41°31′45″N 120°10′24″W

Surprise Valley is an endorheic valley in extreme northeastern California, US, about 60 miles in length from north to south. Local people refer to the area as the Tricorner Region because of the region's location at the intersection of California, Oregon, and Nevada state lines. The valley is east of the Modoc County seat of Alturas. The area is part of the Great Basin which extends across most of the northern half of Nevada.

== Terrain ==
Most of the valley is over 4,000 feet above mean sea level (AMSL), and could be characterized as a high altitude desert valley. A series of alkaline lakes occupy low-lying areas. Forested mountains mark the west side of the valley. The Hays Canyon Range, (mostly east of the Nevada state line) is to the east, and the Warner Mountains border to the west. The valley is considered part of the Great Basin, a desert region roughly covering the geographic majority of Nevada and extending into Utah; also regions of southeast Oregon, and southern California, in the east. Communities in Surprise Valley include Eagleville (ZIP Code 96110), Cedarville (96104), Lake City (96115), and Fort Bidwell (96112).

== Visiting ==
Most of the land west of the main north–south highway, Surprise Valley Road, is US Forest Service land. To the east of the road, most land is owned by the Bureau of Land Management (BLM). Recreational facilities on BLM lands tie in with the US Fish and Wildlife Service, Sheldon National Wildlife Refuge, Nevada (formerly called Sheldon Antelope Refuge). Over the region, opportunities for hiking, exploring dirt roads, birding, stalking antelope with cameras, fishing, camping, and mountain biking are available. Big game and bird hunting are popular among some area visitors. A BLM brochure warns, "Snowstorms occasionally strand travelers. May and June snowstorms are not uncommon." There are hot springs and abandoned mine shafts throughout the region.

== Transportation ==
Cedar Pass on State Route 299 is the main east–west road connecting the area with California and the county seat, Alturas. State Route 447 allows passage toward Reno, Nevada via the Black Rock Desert community of Gerlach, Nevada. It is about 152 miles from Cedarville to Reno via this route.

A segment of the Applegate-Lassen Route, a nineteenth century pioneer wagon route to the area, crosses the valley diagonally from north of State Route 299 to Fandango Pass. The route is also known as the California National Historic Trail.

Other roads out of the valley are unpaved. Because of its location along the Nevada state line, it is normal to see patrol cars from the Nevada Highway Patrol and the Washoe County Sheriff's Department transiting the area.

== Telecommunications ==
Wired telephone service in this part of area code 530 is provided by Frontier Communications, and appears to work out of a single central office. There is wireless service to some areas of the valley. This is a remote area and services that people from cities expect are sometimes degraded, expensive, or unavailable. The valley is one of the last places in California where Department of Transportation (Caltrans) highway workers have no radio communications coverage. California Highway Patrol radios were mostly useless in the area until the 1980s installation of a remote-controlled base station intended to cover the valley. The unvoted base station works over a 76 MHz link to establish radio connectivity from the Highway Patrol's command center to this remote area.

== Indian tribal governments ==
There are two sovereign tribal governments in the valley: The Cedarville Rancheria and the Fort Bidwell Indian Community of the Fort Bidwell Reservation of California. The Cedarville Rancheria is a Paiute community on the southwest edge of Cedarville; it is led by Chairwoman Virginia Lash. The larger Fort Bidwell Paiute community is located at the Fort Bidwell Reservation to the north, and is led by Chairman Aaron Townsend.

== Special districts ==
The area is entirely inside the Modoc County Air Pollution Control District. Education is provided by K-through-12 provider Surprise Valley Joint Unified School District headquartered in Cedarville. The Surprise Valley Hospital District, also known as Surprise Valley Healthcare District, operates a clinic in Cedarville. Cedarville Water District is in Cedarville.
