= Warren Peak (California) =

Mountain in the state of California

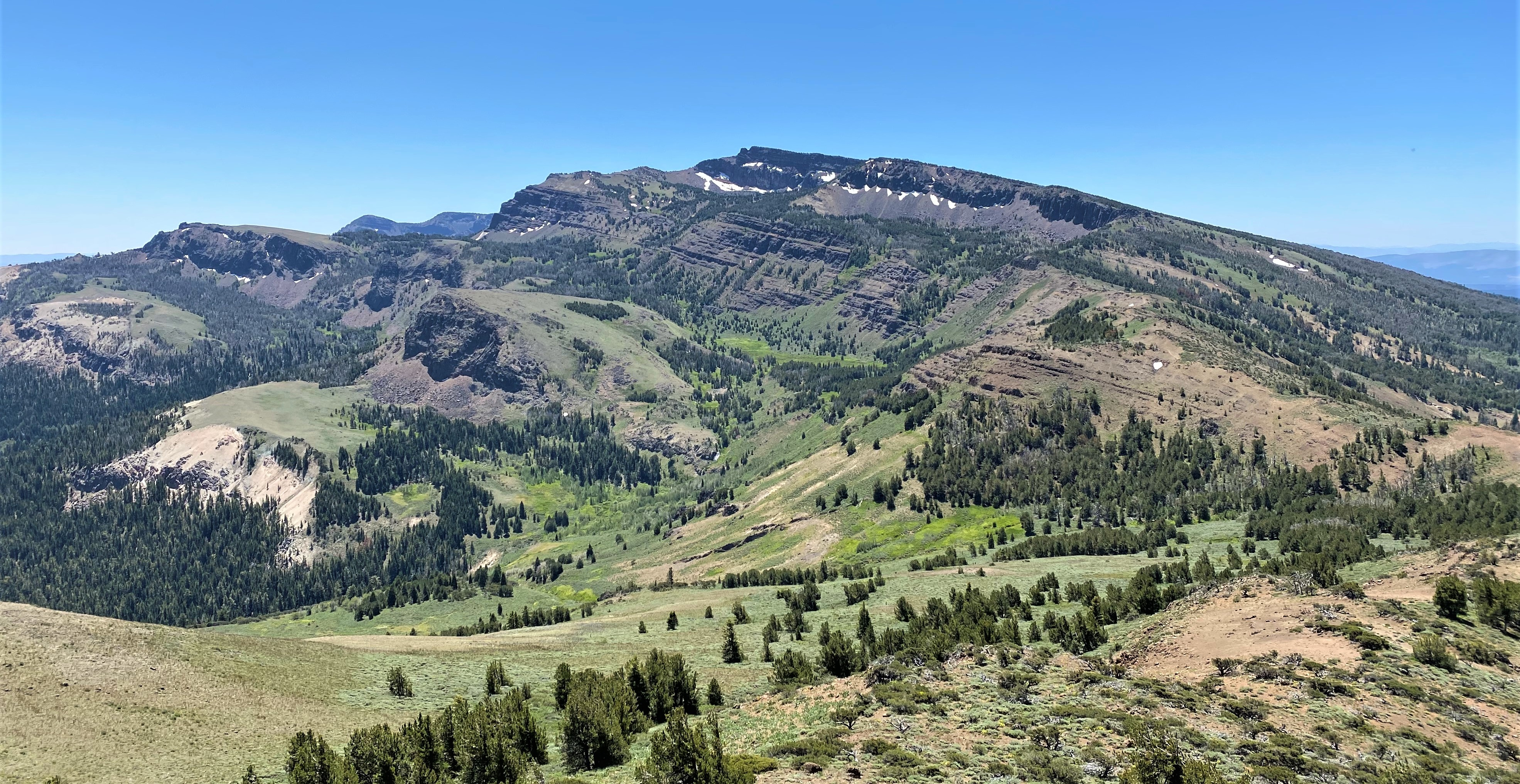
- North aspect

Highest point
- Elevation: 9,710 ft (2,960 m)
- Prominence: 1,110 ft (338 m)
- Parent peak: Peak 9795
- Isolation: 5.82 mi (9.37 km)
- Coordinates: 41°22′43″N 120°13′13″W

Naming
- Etymology: Gouverneur K. Warren

Geography
- Location within California Location within the United States
- Location: South Warner Wilderness
- Country: United States of America
- State: California
- County: Modoc
- Parent range: Warner Mountains; The Great Basin Ranges
- Topo map: USGS Warren Peak

Geology
- Rock age: Miocene
- Rock type(s): Andesite, Basalt

Warren Peak is a 9,710-foot-elevation (2,960-meter) mountain summit located in Modoc County, California, United States.

== Description ==
Warren Peak ranks as the third-highest summit in the Warner Mountains which are located in the northeast corner of California. The summit is set within the South Warner Wilderness on land managed by Modoc National Forest. The remote peak is situated 20 miles east-southeast of Alturas, California, and four miles west of Surprise Valley. Topographic relief is significant as the summit rises over 5,100 feet (1,600 meters) above the valley. Precipitation runoff from this mountain drains west into Pine Creek which is a tributary of the South Fork Pit River, and east to Middle Alkali Lake via Owl Creek and Cottonwood Creek.

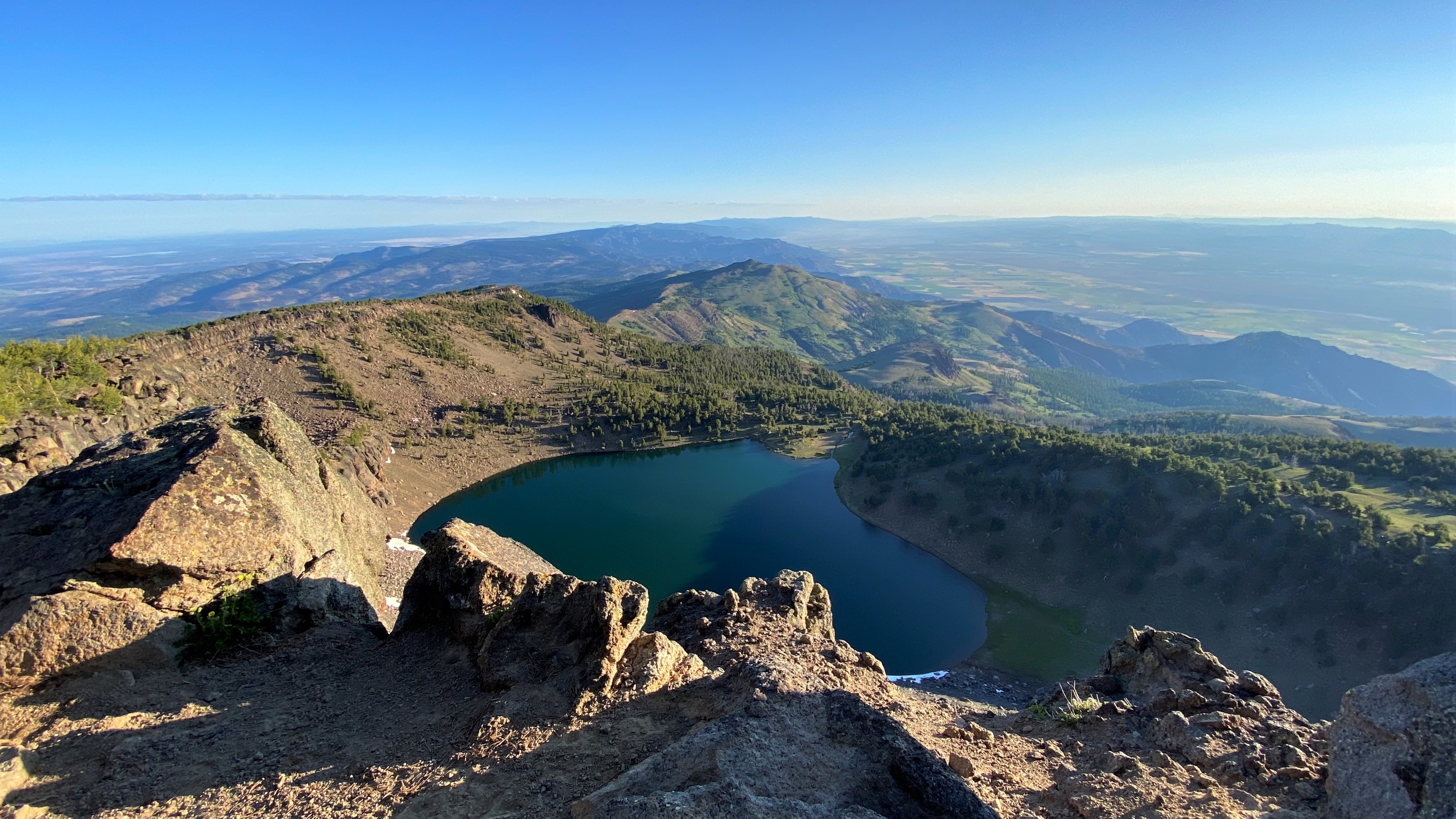
Patterson Lake from summit

The Summit Trail traverses the east slope of the peak and provides an approach option. The trail also leads to the most popular destination in the wilderness, Patterson Lake, which lies directly below the summit in the north cirque. Whitebark pine covers some of the peak's slopes which are composed of volcanic rock.

The landform's toponym has been officially adopted by the U.S. Board on Geographic Names and the name has appeared in publications since at least 1884. The mountain has also been known as "Warren's Peak" and Buck Mountain.
