= Harold J. Powers =

American politician (1900–1996)

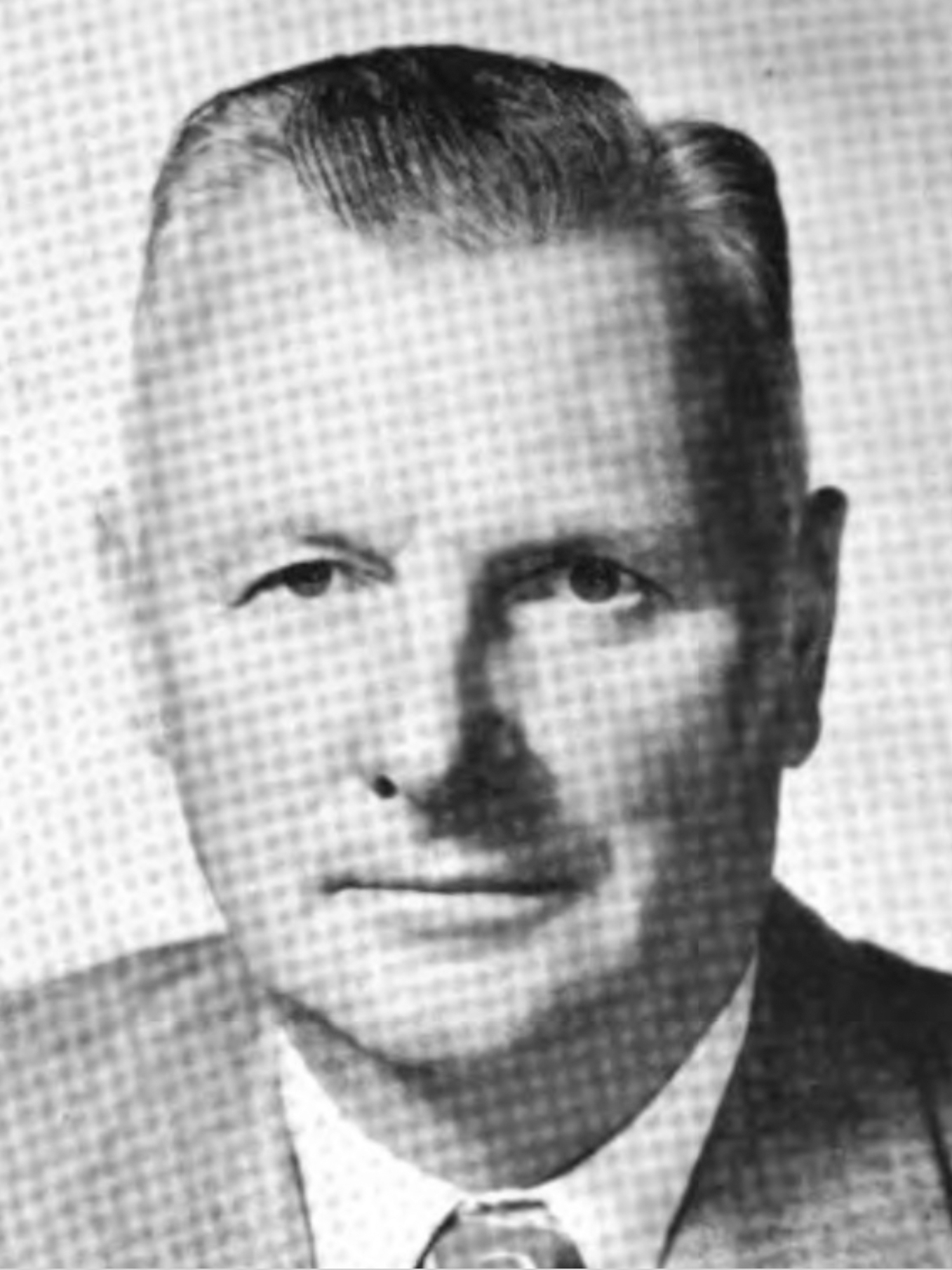
- Official portrait, 1954

36th Lieutenant Governor of California
- In office October 5, 1953 – January 5, 1959
- Governor: Goodwin Knight
- Preceded by: Goodwin Knight
- Succeeded by: Glenn M. Anderson

38th President pro tempore of the California State Senate
- In office 1947–1953
- Preceded by: Jerrold L. Seawell
- Succeeded by: Clarence C. Ward

Member of the California State Senate
- In office 1933–1953

Personal details
- Born: October 9, 1900 Eagleville, California, U.S.
- Died: October 16, 1996 (aged 96) Cedarville, California, U.S.
- Party: Republican
- Education: UC Davis

Harold Jay "Butch" Powers (October 8, 1900 – October 16, 1996) was the 36th lieutenant governor of California, serving from 1953 to 1959 under Governor Goodwin Knight.

== Career ==
Powers was born in Eagleville, Modoc County, California, in 1900. He was a rancher primarily in Modoc County, but owned several ranches in California, Nevada, and Idaho. First elected to the California State Senate in 1932, Powers represented Lassen, Modoc and Plumas counties. He served as President pro tempore of the Senate beginning in 1947.

In his capacity as Senate president pro tempore, Powers was to succeed the lieutenant governor in case of a vacancy in that office. This occurred in 1953, when Governor Earl Warren resigned to become chief justice of the United States and Lieutenant Governor Goodwin Knight succeeded to the governorship. Powers was elected to a full term in 1954, and sought re-election in 1958, but in the Democratic landslide that year he lost to Glenn M. Anderson.

In 1962, Powers ran for governor but withdrew at the urging of Republican leaders who supported former Vice President Richard M. Nixon. After giving up his campaign for governor, Powers focused on rallying opposition to Nixon and to gain support for Democratic incumbent Edmund G. Brown, who defeated Nixon in the general election.

== Education ==
Powers obtained his degree from the University of California, Davis.

== Death ==
He died of pneumonia in 1996 in Cedarville, California, at the age of 96.

Political offices
Preceded by Goodwin Knight	Lieutenant Governor of California; 1953—1959	Succeeded by Glenn M. Anderson
