= Alkali Lakes (California) =

Three Lakes in the states of California and Nevada, United States

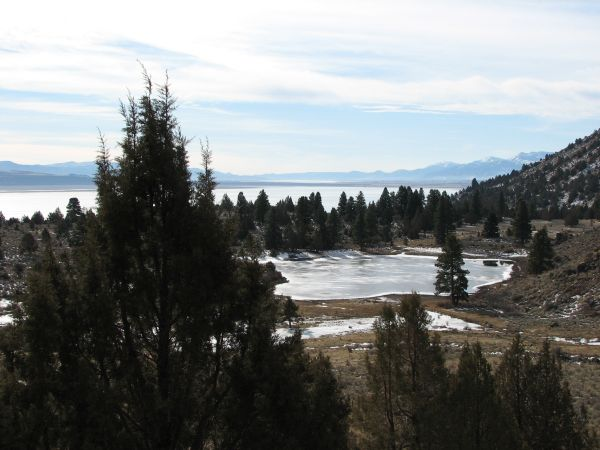
- A flooded Upper Alkali Lake is seen from Fandango Pass in the Warner Mountains in January 2012

- Location within California Location within the United States
- Location: Modoc County, California and Washoe County, Nevada
- Coordinates: 41°44′04″N 120°08′17″W (Upper Alkali Lake); 41°26′19″N 120°03′27″W (Middle Alkali Lake); 41°14′55″N 120°02′19″W (Lower Alkali Lake)
- Type: Endorheic basin, alkaline, seasonal
- Part of: Great Basin
- Primary outflows: None
- Catchment area: 878 mi^{2} (2,270 km^{2})
- Basin countries: United States
- Surface area: 370 mi^{2} (960 km^{2}) (Total)

The Alkali Lakes are a series of three large playas located in the Surprise Valley of northeastern California, United States. From north to south they are known as Upper, Middle and Lower Alkali Lake. Upper Alkali Lake is often known simply as Upper Lake, and Lower Alkali Lake as Lower Lake. Although mostly located in Modoc County, California, the eastern edges of Middle and Lower Lakes touch Washoe County, Nevada. The Warner Mountains are located to the west of the three lakes. The lake beds are typically flooded with shallow water in the winter but dry up during most summers.

== Location and history ==
Prior to European settlement, the area was inhabited by the Kidütökadö, a band of the Northern Paiute. The town of Fort Bidwell is located at the north end of Upper Alkali Lake. Lake City and Cedarville are located between and west of Upper and Middle Alkali Lakes. Eagleville is situated south of Lower Alkali Lake. California State Route 299 crosses the basin in-between the Upper and Middle lakes. As the crow flies, the lakes are located about 40 miles (64 km) east of Alturas and 150 miles (240 km) northeast of Redding.

The lakes lie at the bottom of a graben created by the Surprise Valley Fault, which has experienced nearly a mile (1.6 km) of vertical displacement, resulting in the steep eastern scarp of the Warner Mountains. They are a remnant of Glacial Lake Lahontan, which existed up until about 12,000 years ago during the last ice age. Sediment deposits indicate Lake Lahontan was up to 550 feet (170 m) deep in this area, which would have filled the entire valley.

The surrounding area has been used for agriculture since the first settlers arrived in the 1840s. The valley was named "Surprise" because of the relatively abundant greenery, supported by streams flowing from the Warner Mountains, in stark contrast to the surrounding high desert country. With growing water use and drought conditions in the 21st century, falling groundwater levels in the basin are an increasing concern.

Salt was extracted from briny wells on the east side of Middle Alkali Lake until 1943.

== Hydrology ==
The lakes form an endorheic (closed) drainage system in the western edge of the Great Basin. With a total combined surface area of 370 square miles (960 km^{2}), the lakes receive runoff from a drainage basin of 878 square miles (2,270 km^{2}) and are considered part of California's North Lahontan watershed. Despite the nomenclature, the direction of water flow is not from north to south. Middle Alkali Lake is actually the highest at 4,478 ft (1,365 m) above sea level. Water will either flow south to Lower Alkali Lake at 4,472 ft (1,363 m), or north to Upper Alkali Lake at 4,449 ft (1,356 m).

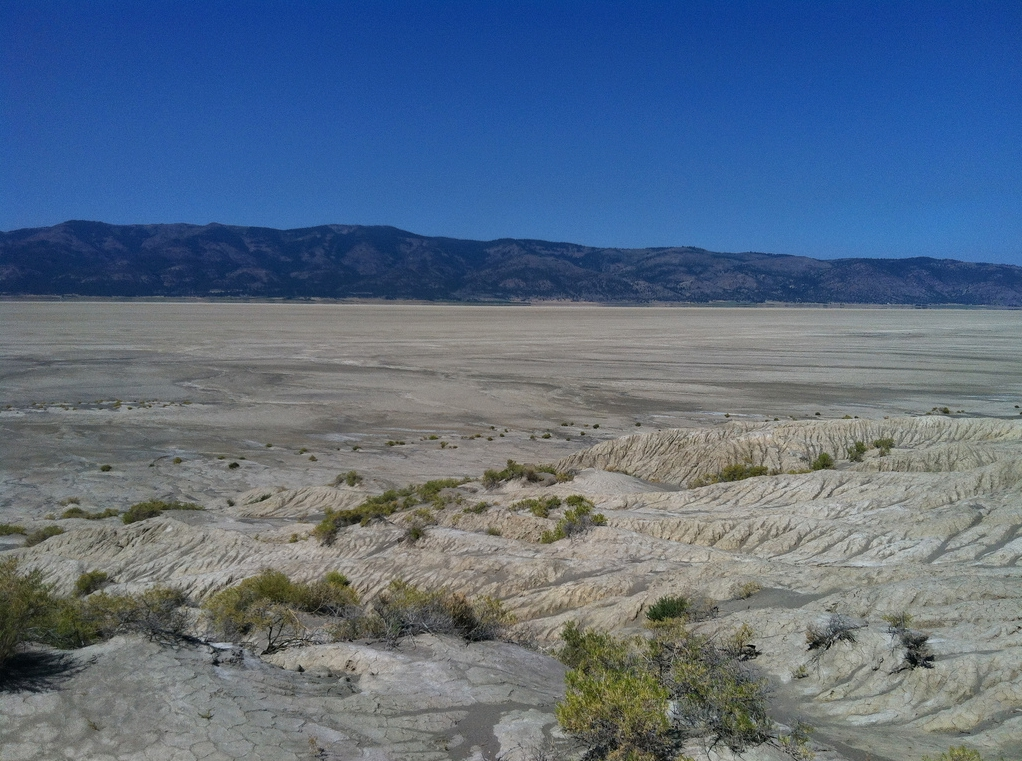
Dry lakebed in the Surprise Valley, looking west toward Warner Mountains

The lakes are seasonally flooded with alkaline water in most years, drying out in the summer. Annual precipitation in the basin ranges from 13 to 17 inches (330 to 430 mm). The average annual runoff is 160,000 acre-feet (200,000,000 m^{3}), which occurs mainly between March and June as snowmelt. This is enough to flood the lake beds 8 inches (200 mm) deep; however, most of the water is either appropriated for irrigation, or evaporates in the desert heat. Formed by erosion during the Pleistocene, the alluvial deposits that make up the lake beds are up to 5,000 feet (1,500 m) deep at Middle Alkali Lake and hold significant amounts of groundwater. The 228,460-acre (92,450 ha) Surprise Valley Groundwater Basin has an estimated volume of 4,000,000 acre⋅ft (4.9 km^{3}).

=== Upper Alkali Lake ===
The northernmost lake, Upper Alkali Lake has a drainage area of 318 square miles (820 km^{2}). The lake is fed by Bidwell, Second, Goose, Wilkinson, Mill, Releford and Soldier Creeks, as well as overflow from Middle Alkali Lake if the level of that lake is high enough.

=== Middle Alkali Lake ===
Middle Alkali Lake is the largest by both surface area and drainage area. The total catchment of Middle Alkali Lake is 376 square miles (970 km^{2}). Creeks flowing into the lake include Sand, Fortymile, Cedar, Deep, Granger, Milk, Cottonwood, Owl and Raider Creeks. Between Middle and Lower Alkali Lakes there is a smaller lake called Cambron Lake, fed by Highrock and Eagle Creeks.

=== Lower Alkali Lake ===
Lower Alkali Lake is the southernmost and smallest lake, draining 212 square miles (550 km^{2}). Streams feeding the lake include Emerson, Barber, and Bare Creeks, as well as occasional overflow from Middle Alkali Lake.

== See also ==
- List of lakes of California
