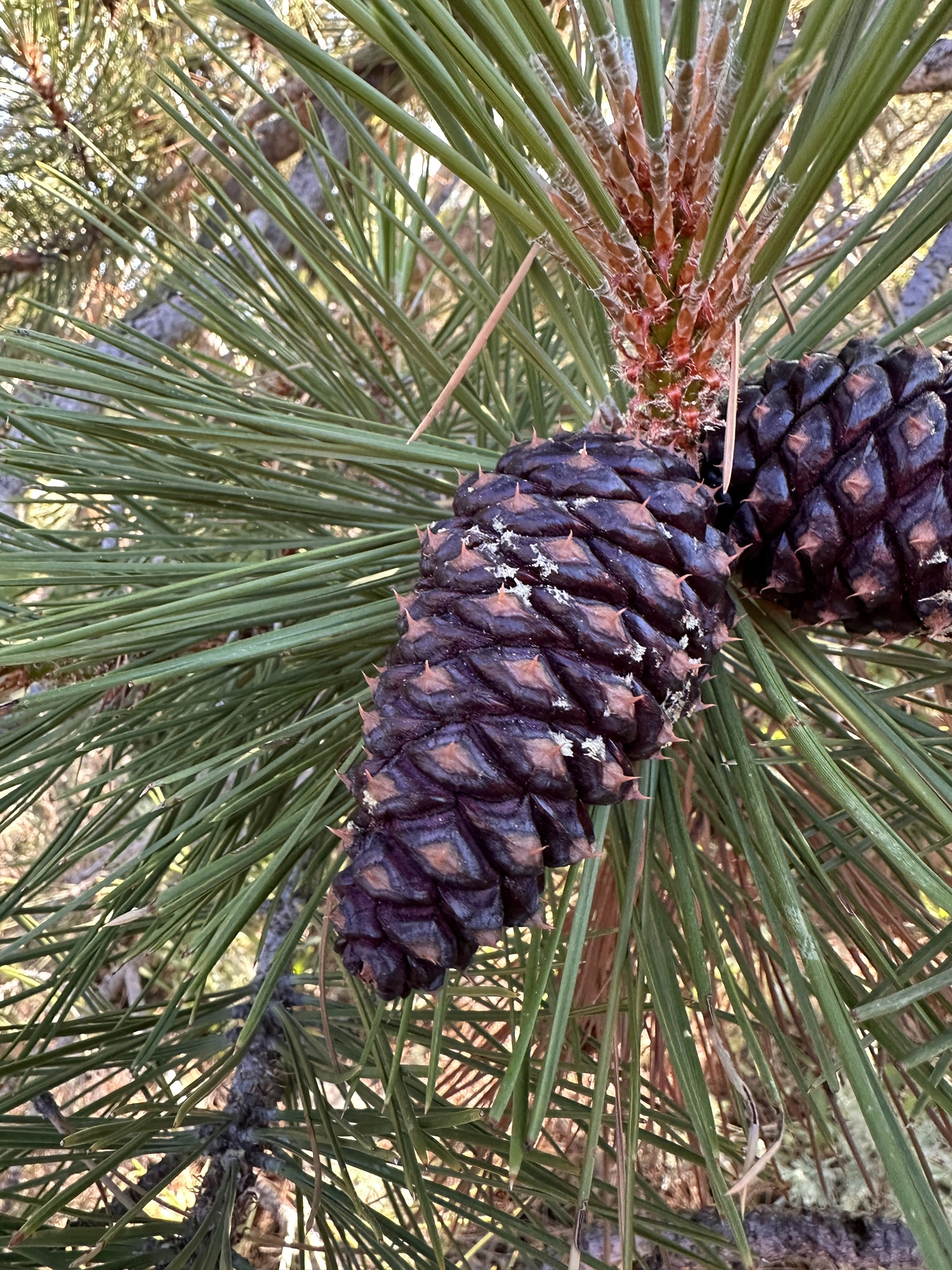
- Pinuswashoensis needles and cones

Conservation status
- Vulnerable (NatureServe)

Scientific classification (disputed)
- Kingdom: Plantae
- Clade: Tracheophytes
- Clade: Gymnospermae
- Division: Pinophyta
- Class: Pinopsida
- Order: Pinales
- Family: Pinaceae
- Genus: Pinus
- Subgenus: P. subg. Pinus
- Section: P. sect. Trifoliae
- Subsection: P. subsect. Ponderosae
- Species: P. washoensis

Binomial name
- Pinus washoensis Mason & Stockwell, 1945
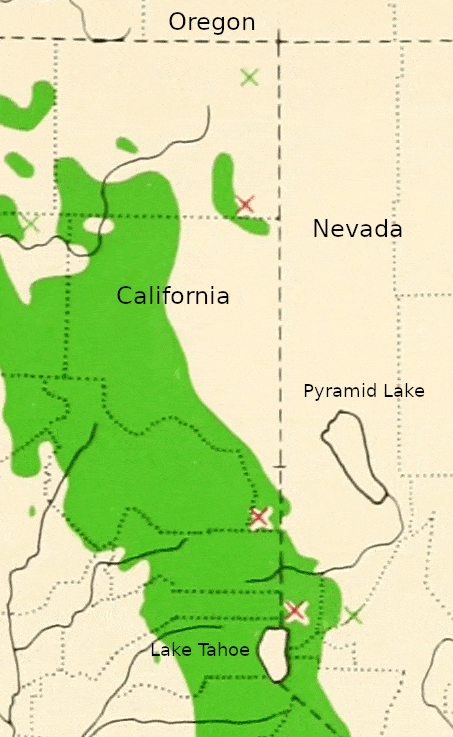
- Pinus washoensis range marked with red X, P. jeffreyi in green

Synonyms
- Pinus ponderosa subsp. washoensis (Mason & Stockwell) A.E.Murray, 1982; Pinus ponderosa var. washoensis (Mason & Stockwell) W.S.Ting, 1966

= Pinus washoensis =

Species of conifer

Pinus washoensis, the Washoe pine, is a rare, semi-disputed species of large-sized conifer in the family Pinaceae. The species was described by Herbert Louis Mason and William Palmer Stockwell in 1945. It is in the Pinus subsect. Ponderosae with the Ponderosa pine.

== Etymology ==
Pinus washoensis was named for the Washoe people, who inhabited the lands around Lake Tahoe and surrounding areas; not for Washoe County, Nevada (also named after the Washoe people).

== Taxonomy ==
The Washoe pine has a disputed taxonomic rank, for some believe it should be a subspecies or variety of Pinus ponderosa. Other sources list it as a synonym of Pinus ponderosa var. ponderosa (or Pinus ponderosa subsp. ponderosa), with no recollection of the Washoe pine at all. This is a result of misclassification and distribution errors brought about by similar structures, and general similarities between the Ponderosa pine and the Washoe pine. Its taxonomic status has not been decided on though, for every source supports a different classification than a compared other. Most recently in 1982, the botanist Albert Edward Murray, listed it as a subspecies of the Ponderosa pine, which is still partially accepted today. The U.S. Forest Service recognizes it as a variety of the Ponderosa pine but also lists every subspecies of the Ponderosa pine as a variety (with previous varieties included too). They believe that the Washoe pine evolved through a hybrid between Pinus ponderosa subsp. ponderosa and Pinus ponderosa var. scopulorum, which may be valid because of seen similarities. The United States Department Of Agriculture (USDA) also recognizes it as a variety. The IUCN Red List lists it as a synonym of Pinus ponderosa subsp. ponderosa. NatureServe recognizes it as a true species, but the United States Geographical Survey (USGS) recognizes it as a variety; hence its taxonomic status is unknown, but likely to either be a species, or a variety.

== Description ==
On average, trees reach a height of 60 m (196.85 ft), and 100 cm (3.28 ft) DBH. Height differs between individuals though; some being taller and more robust. Trunk is straight and cylindrical, with a layered, pyramidal crown. Bark can be from a yellow-brown to a red-brown, fissured, with scaly plates. Branches are spreading and ascending, rough textured, with stout twigs that are an orange-grey color. Tree buds are a red-brown color, 1.5-2.0 cm (0.59-0.78 in) long, and not resinous. Needles or leaves are 10–15 cm (3.93-5.90 in) long, grey-green, partially twisted, with 2-3 leaves per fascicle. Pollen cones are red-purple, and 10–20 mm (0.39-0.78 in) long. Seed cones (conifer cones) are ovoid, 7–10 cm (2.75-3.93 in) long, tan to a pale red-brown color, and pyramidal. Seed cones mature within a span of two years. Seeds are ellipsoid-like, 0.8 cm (0.31 in) long, gray to a brown color, with wings up to 16 cm (6.29 in) long.

It can be differentiated from Pinus jeffreyi and Pinus ponderosa (from which it closely resembles) by its mature seed cones, for they are less prickly than either species. Pinus washoensis also has shorter needles than Pinus ponderosa and Pinus jeffreyi. It is similar in the fact that it produces a vanilla odor only seen in two species: Pinus jeffreyi, and Pinus ponderosa (subsp. bethamiana). The cones are also 7–10 cm (2.75-3.93 in) long, compared to Pinus ponderosa (subsp. benthamiana) which has 7–15 cm (2.75-5.90 in) cones.

== Distribution and habitat ==
Pinus washoensis is native to a small portion of Washoe County, Nevada, and two other separate locations in northeastern California. Its range is located within dry-montane forests and mixed-conifer forests at upward elevations of 2100–2500 m (6889–8202 ft) in the Sierra Nevada. The United States Department Of Agriculture (USDA) and the United States Geographical Survey (USGS) claim that populations in the Warner Mountains may reach elevations of 8,000 ft (2,400 m); most likely being the case. Pinus washoensis prefers west or south-facing slopes (although this is still partially disputed). The largest population is located in the southern Warner Mountains of California. There is a potential population in upper Hayfork Creek, Trinity Mountains, California, that has incredibly tall individuals which may be its own distinct taxon. Populations have been recorded from far southern Oregon too, but are limited to an extent. It is seen growing beside Pinus ponderosa subsp. ponderosa, Pinus ponderosa subsp. benthamiana, Pinus jeffreyi, Pinus monticola, and Pinus contorta. Pinus washoensis also has its own distinct alliance with Pinus jefferyi, being the Jeffrey Pine - Washoe Pine Mixed Conifer Woodland Alliance, that is limited due to the Washoe pine's small range. It includes the following species: Pinus ponderosa, Calocedrus decurrens, Chrysolepis chrysophylla, Pseudotsuga menziesii, Pinus monticola, Pinus monophylla, Abies magnifica, Abies concolor subsp. lowiana, Arbutus menziesii, Quercus kelloggii, Quercus chrysolepis, Quercus wislizeni, Chamaecyparis lawsoniana, Artemisia tridentata subsp. vaseyana, Arctostaphylos nevadensis, Arctostaphylos patula, Arctostaphylos canescens, Ceanothus pumilus, Ceanothus cuneatus, Ceanothus cordulatus, Ceanothus velutinus, Cercocarpus ledifolius, Chrysolepis sempervirens, Ericameria ophitidis, Purshia tridentata, Quercus vacciniifolia, Rhus trilobata, and Symphoricarpos longiflorus.

== Conservation ==
Pinus washoensis is currently listed as "Vulnerable" or "G3" by NatureServe, for its small range makes the species susceptible to deforestation, logging, and wildfires. The IUCN Red List does not recognize it as a distinct species, instead listing it as a synonym of Pinus ponderosa subsp. ponderosa.

== Recorded specimens ==
The tallest specimen was recorded to be 50.6 m (166.01 ft) tall, and 160 cm (5.24 ft) DBH. One specimen (the oldest recorded), is over 300 years old and is currently standing up upon Mt. Rose in Washoe County, Nevada.
