= New Year Lake =

Lake in Nevada, United States

- Location in Nevada
- Location: Washoe County, Nevada
- Coordinates: 41°45′13.7″N 119°57′1.61″W
- Surface elevation: 5,948 ft (1,813 m)
- References: GNIS ID: 863317

New Year Lake is a lake in the Hays Canyon Range of northwestern Washoe County, Nevada, US, at elevation 5,948 feet (1,813 metres). Explorer John C. Frémont passed New Year Lake on December 26, 1843 during his second expedition; it was included, unnamed, on the map he created after the expedition in 1845. The name of New Year Lake was changed into Crook's Lake in the Geographic Names Information System (GNIS) in 1966 after a local rancher sent a note to the Board on Geographic Names, in which he wrote that the lake was called "Crooks Lake" ever since a battle took place in 1867 near the lake between General George Crook and the Northern Paiute. However, no reference to a battle at this location was noted in a history about the Snake War, though Crook was at the Battle of Steen's Mountain. The name change was reversed in 1989 because the name "New Year Lake" was used historically. "Crooks Lake" is listed as a variant name together with Roops Lake.
