= Lookout, California =

Lookout
- census-designated place
- Location in California
- Coordinates: 41°12′29″N 121°09′19″W
- Country: United States
- State: California
- County: Modoc

Area
  - Total: 5.589 sq mi (14.475 km^{2})
  - Land: 5.464 sq mi (14.152 km^{2})
  - Water: 0.125 sq mi (0.323 km^{2}) 2.23%
- Elevation: 4,144 ft (1,263 m)

Population (2020)
  - Total: 68
  - Density: 12/sq mi (4.8/km^{2})
- Time zone: UTC-8 (Pacific (PST))
  - Summer (DST): UTC-7 (PDT)
- ZIP Code: 96054
- Area code: 530
- GNIS feature IDs: 262896; 2583062

Lookout (formerly, Whitley's Ford) is a census-designated place in Modoc County, California, United States. It is located 11 miles (18 km) west of Adin, at an elevation of 4144 feet (1263 m). Its population is 68 as of the 2020 census, down from 84 from the 2010 census. Lookout's ZIP Code is 96054.

The Whitley's Ford post office operated from 1874 to 1875. The Lookout post office opened in 1880. The original name honors James W. Whitley, a local hotelier. The name Lookout recalls how Native Americans used nearby hills as observation points.

== The lynching of 1901 ==
On May 31, 1901, a group of masked men rushed the guards who were watching over five members of an extended family who were being held in custody in the town's hotel as Lookout, California did not have a jail. The men, Daniel Yantes, Martin Wilson, and Frank, Jim and Calvin Hall were taken to the Pitt River Bridge, and hung from the railings. Three had terrorized the locals for years; robbing, stealing, cattle rustling, vandalizing property and livestock. Martin Wilson was 13 years old and completely innocent of any crime. Calvin the step father, also was innocent and was hung for fear of being able to name the members of the lynch mob. He was in his late 70s. The family also ran a safe house at their ranch for criminals on the run. When arrested for their crimes, the clan always hired attorneys who used their skills or bribery to get the charges dropped. On May 30, 1901, the men were taken into custody for cattle rustling, but knowing that there would only be more trouble once the men were given bail, local citizens formed a vigilante committee and lynched them. On June 10, 1901, a grand jury indicted R.E. Leventon, Isom Eades and James Brown and held them for trial. Lookout was suddenly full of reporters, bounty hunters, attorneys and state officials. The men were acquitted in January 1902. The trial cost Modoc County $40,000. The overwhelming evidence of their guilt was discovered by John Boessenecker and published in his book Badge and Buckshot: Lawlessness in Old California (1988).

== Geography ==
According to the United States Census Bureau, the CDP covers an area of 5.6 square miles (14.5 km^{2}), of which 97.77% is land and 2.23% water.

=== Climate ===
This region experiences warm (but not hot) and dry summers, with no average monthly temperatures above 71.6 °F. According to the Köppen Climate Classification system, Lookout has a warm-summer Mediterranean climate, abbreviated "Csb" on climate maps. Winters are very harsh, with dry cold snow with temperatures sometimes around or below zero.

== Demographics ==
Historical population
Census	Pop.	Note	%±
2010	84		—
2020	68		−19.0%
U.S. Decennial Census; 2010

Lookout first appeared as a census designated place in the 2010 U.S. census.

The 2020 United States census reported that Lookout had a population of 68. The population density was 12.4 inhabitants per square mile (4.8/km^{2}). The racial makeup of Lookout was 60 (88%) White, 0 (0%) African American, 1 (1%) Native American, 0 (0%) Asian, 0 (0%) Pacific Islander, 1 (1%) from other races, and 6 (9%) from two or more races. Hispanic or Latino of any race were 6 persons (9%).

The whole population lived in households. There were 24 households, out of which 10 (42%) had children under the age of 18 living in them, 8 (33%) were married-couple households, 0 (0%) were cohabiting couple households, 12 (50%) had a female householder with no partner present, and 4 (17%) had a male householder with no partner present. 10 households (42%) were one person, and 7 (29%) were one person aged 65 or older. The average household size was 2.83. There were 12 families (50% of all households).

The age distribution was 20 people (29%) under the age of 18, 1 people (1%) aged 18 to 24, 11 people (16%) aged 25 to 44, 11 people (16%) aged 45 to 64, and 25 people (37%) who were 65 years of age or older. The median age was 51.0 years. There were 40 males and 28 females.

There were 45 housing units at an average density of 8.2 units per square mile (3.2 units/km^{2}), of which 24 (53%) were occupied. Of these, 13 (54%) were owner-occupied, and 11 (46%) were occupied by renters.

== Politics ==
In the state legislature, Lookout is in the 1st senatorial district, represented by Republican Megan Dahle, and the 1st Assembly district, represented by Republican Heather Hadwick.

Federally, Lookout is in California's 1st congressional district, represented by Republican James Gallagher.

== Education ==
Big Valley Joint Unified School District is the local school district.
