= Cedarville Airport =

- IATA: none; ICAO: none; FAA LID: O59

Summary
- Airport type: County of Modoc
- Operator: Cedarville, California
- Location: Cedarville, California
- Elevation AMSL: 4,623 ft (1,409 m)
- Coordinates: 41°33′10″N 120°09′59″W
- Interactive map of Cedarville Airport

Runways
Direction	Length		Surface
Direction	ft	m	Surface
1/19	4,415	1,346	Asphalt

Cedarville Airport (FAA LID: O59) is a public airport located two miles (3.2 km) north of Cedarville, serving Modoc County, California, United States. It is mostly used for general aviation.

== Facilities ==
Cedarville Airport covers 76 acres (310,000 m^{2}) and has one runway:

- Runway 1/19: 4,415 x 50 ft (1,346 x 15 m), surface: asphalt
