= Daphnedale Park, California =

Daphnedale Park
- census-designated place
- Location of Daphnedale Park in Modoc County, California.

- Location in California
- Coordinates: 41°30′33″N 120°32′42″W
- Country: United States
- State: California
- County: Modoc

Area
  - Total: 0.83 sq mi (2.15 km^{2})
  - Land: 0.83 sq mi (2.14 km^{2})
  - Water: 0 sq mi (0.00 km^{2}) 0.22%
- Elevation: 4,449 ft (1,356 m)

Population (2020)
  - Total: 129
  - Density: 155.9/sq mi (60.21/km^{2})
- Time zone: UTC-8 (Pacific (PST))
  - Summer (DST): UTC-7 (PDT)
- Area code: 530
- GNIS feature IDs: 1658375; 2582990

Daphnedale Park is a census-designated place in Modoc County, California, United States. It is located 1.5 miles (2.4 km) north of Alturas, at an elevation of 4449 feet (1356 m). Its population is 129 as of the 2020 census, down from 184 from the 2010 census.

== Geography ==
Two parallel primary streets, Saralane and Lucilane, access the Daphnedale subdivision from the northern boundary of the city of Alturas at W. 19th St.

According to the United States Census Bureau, the CDP covers an area of 0.8 square mile (2.1 km^{2}), of which 99.78% is land, and 0.22% is water. At the 2010 census, the CDP was larger, covering 1.3 square miles (3.4 km^{2}).

== Demographics ==
Historical population
Census	Pop.	Note	%±
2010	184		—
2020	129		−29.9%
U.S. Decennial Census; 1850–1870 1880-1890; 1900 1910 1920; 1930 1940 1950; 1960 1970 1980; 1990 2000 2010

Daphnedale Park first appeared as a census designated place in the 2010 U.S. census.

The 2020 United States census reported that Daphnedale Park had a population of 129. The population density was 156.0 inhabitants per square mile (60.2/km^{2}). The racial makeup of Daphnedale Park was 99 (76.7%) White, 6 (4.7%) African American, 4 (3.1%) Native American, 0 (0.0%) Asian, 0 (0.0%) Pacific Islander, 5 (3.9%) from other races, and 15 (11.6%) from two or more races. Hispanic or Latino of any race were 9 persons (7.0%).

The whole population lived in households. There were 56 households, out of which 20 (35.7%) had children under the age of 18 living in them, 32 (57.1%) were married-couple households, 10 (17.9%) were cohabiting couple households, 8 (14.3%) had a female householder with no partner present, and 6 (10.7%) had a male householder with no partner present. 7 households (12.5%) were one person, and 4 (7.1%) were one person aged 65 or older. The average household size was 2.3. There were 44 families (78.6% of all households).

The age distribution was 29 people (22.5%) under the age of 18, 1 people (0.8%) aged 18 to 24, 36 people (27.9%) aged 25 to 44, 34 people (26.4%) aged 45 to 64, and 29 people (22.5%) who were 65 years of age or older. The median age was 44.3 years. There were 55 males and 74 females.

There were 56 housing units at an average density of 67.7 units per square mile (26.1 units/km^{2}), which were all occupied, 47 (83.9%) by homeowners and 9 (16.1%) by renters.

== Politics ==
In the state legislature, Daphnedale Park is in the 1st senatorial district, represented by Republican Megan Dahle, and the 1st Assembly district, represented by Republican Heather Hadwick.

Federally, Daphnedale Park is in California's 1st congressional district, represented by Republican James Gallagher.

== Education ==
Modoc Joint Unified School District is the local school district.
