= Modoc County, California =

County in California, United States

Coordinates: 41.60°N 120.72°W

Modoc County
- County
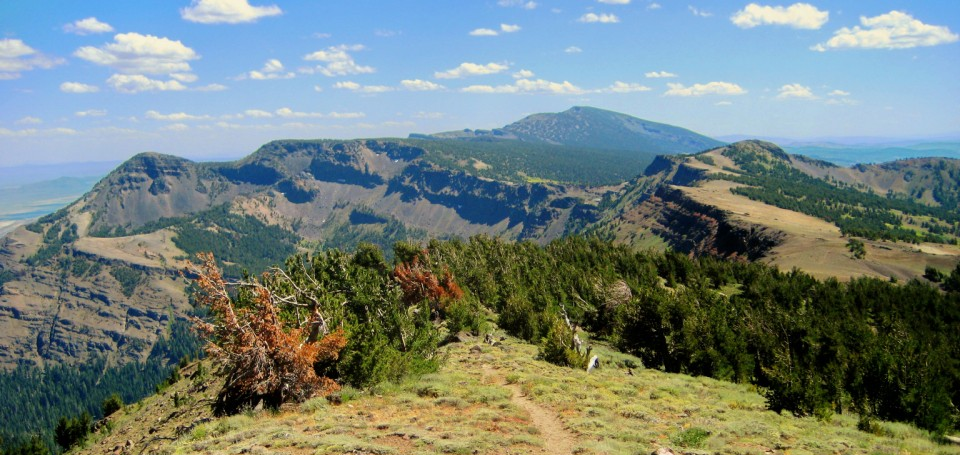
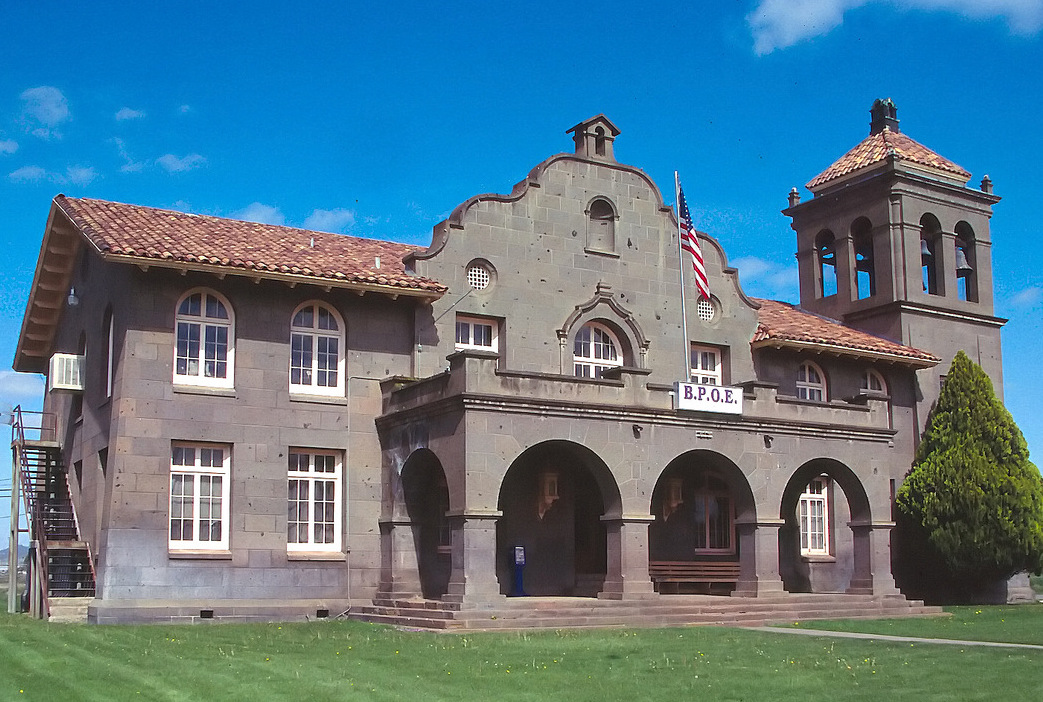
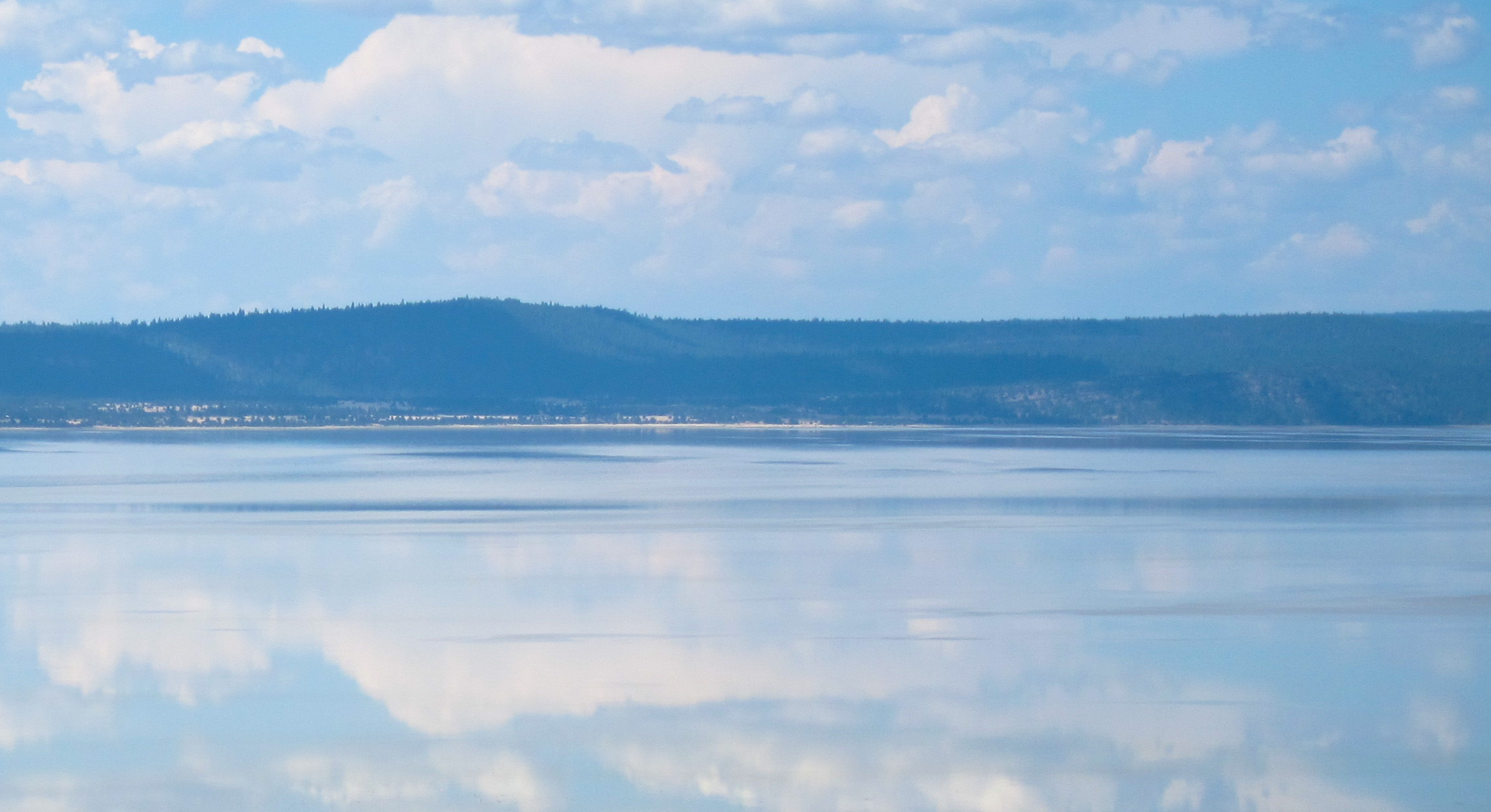
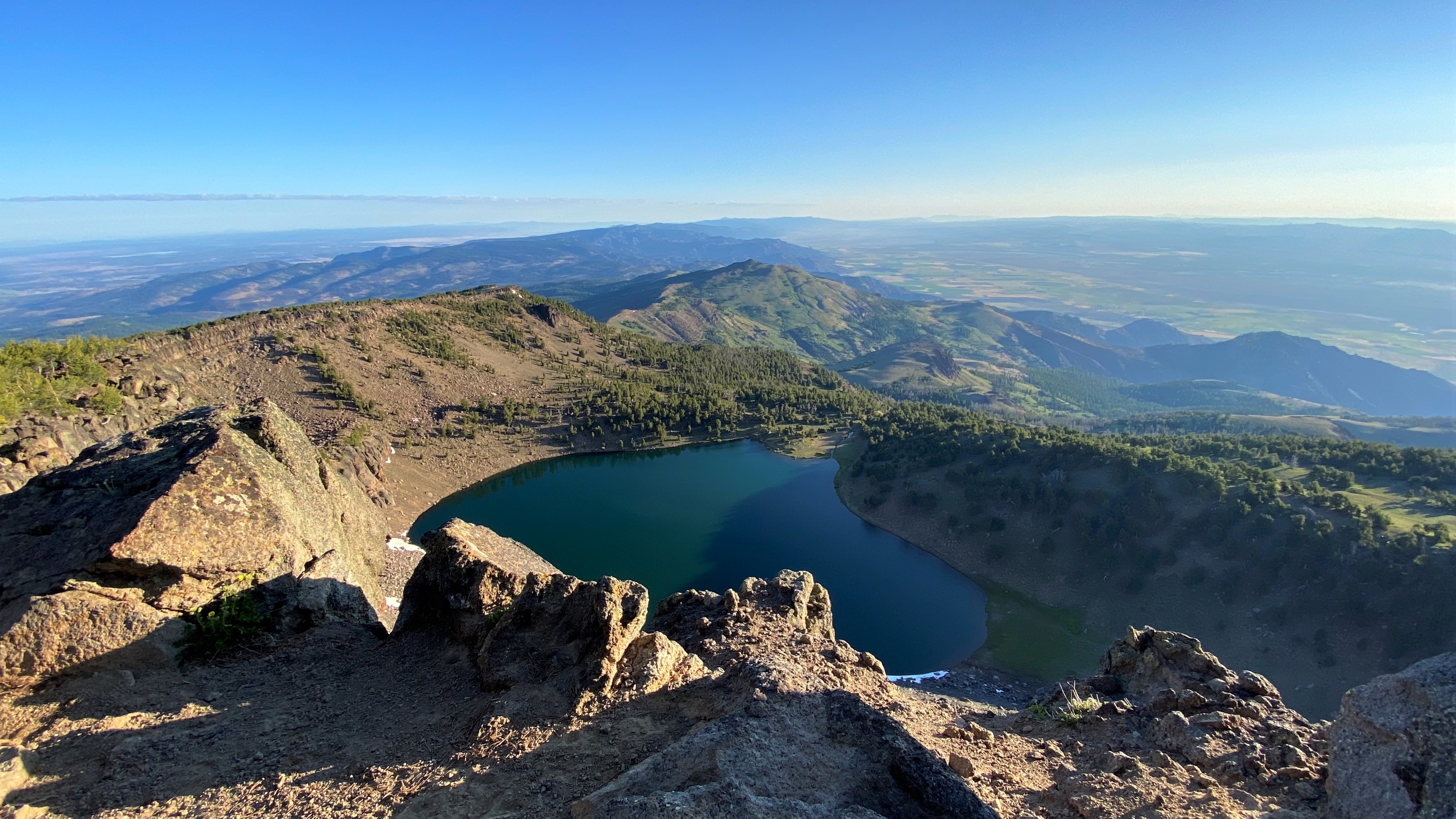
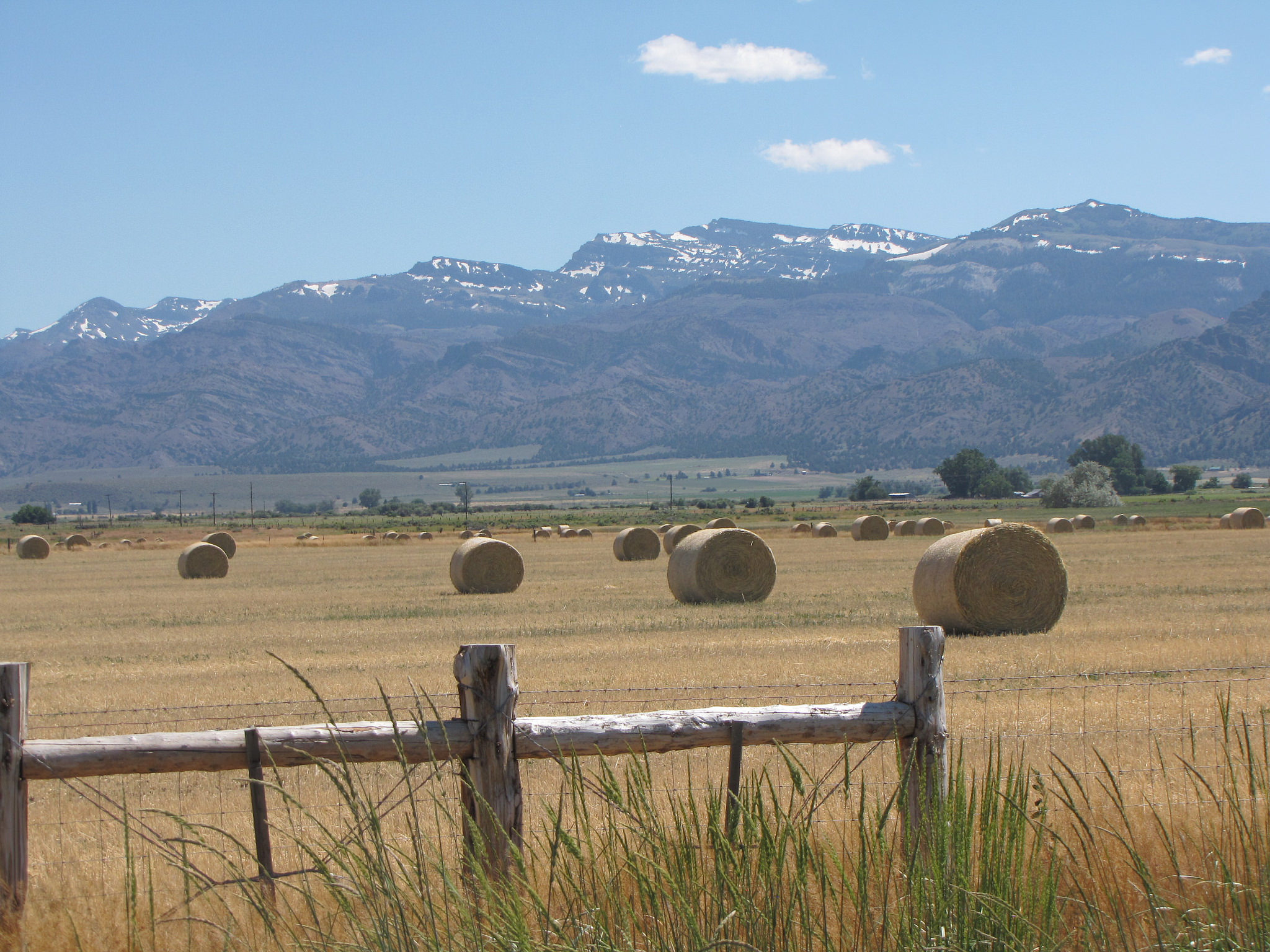
- Modoc National Forest Alturas Goose Lake Warren Peak Surprise Valley

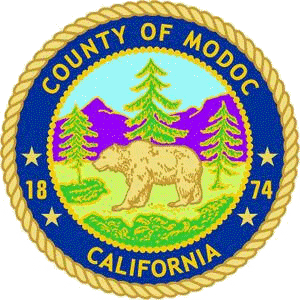
- Seal

- Location in the U.S. state of California
- Interactive map of Modoc County
- Country: United States
- State: California
- Region: Shasta Cascade
- Incorporated: February 17, 1874
- Named for: the Modoc people
- County seat: Alturas
- Largest city: Alturas

Government
  - Type: Council–manager
  - Chair: Geri Byrne
  - Vice Chair: Kathie Rhoads
  - Board of Supervisors: Supervisors: Ned Coe; Shane Starr; Kathie Rhoads; Casey Cockrell; Geri Byrne
  - County Administrative Officer: Chester Robertson

Area
  - Total: 4,203 sq mi (10,890 km^{2})
  - Land: 3,918 sq mi (10,150 km^{2})
  - Water: 286 sq mi (740 km^{2})
- Highest elevation: 9,892 ft (3,015 m)

Population (2020)
  - Total: 8,700
  - Estimate (2025): 8,426 ▼
  - Density: 2.2/sq mi (0.86/km^{2})

GDP
  - Total: $0.580 billion (2022)
- Time zone: UTC-08:00 (PST)
  - Summer (DST): UTC-07:00 (PDT)
- Congressional district: 1st
- Website: www.countyofmodoc.gov

Modoc County (/ˈmoʊdɒk/) is a county located in the far northeastern corner of the U.S. state of California. Its population was 8,700 as of the 2020 census, down from 9,686 from the 2010 census. This makes it California's third-least-populous county. The county seat and only incorporated city is Alturas. Previous County seats include Lake City and Centerville. The county borders Nevada and Oregon. Much of Modoc County is federal land. Several federal agencies, including the United States Forest Service, Bureau of Land Management, National Park Service, Bureau of Indian Affairs, and the United States Fish and Wildlife Service, have employees assigned to the area, and their operations are a significant part of its economy and services. The county's official slogans include "The last best place" and "Where the West still lives".

== History ==
Prior to the arrival of Europeans in the region, varying cultures of Native Americans inhabited the county for thousands of years. At the time of European encounter, the Modoc people lived in what is now northern California, near Lost River and Tule Lake. The county was named after them. The Achomawi (or Pit River Indians, for which the Pit River is named), and the Paiute also lived in the area. To the north were the Klamath in present-day Oregon.

The first European explorers to visit Modoc County were the American John C. Frémont and his traveling party (including Kit Carson) in 1846, who had departed from Sutter's Fort near the confluence of the American and Sacramento Rivers (where Sacramento stands today).

The northern boundary of California, and eventually Modoc County, had been established as the 42nd parallel since the time of Mexican possession. In the absence of a reliable survey of the 120th meridian, the eastern boundary of northern California was a subject of contention before Modoc County formed. The Territory of Utah requested jurisdiction to the summit of the Sierra Nevada. At the time, the Warner Mountains were believed to be a part of the Sierra Nevada, so this would have included Surprise Valley, but California denied the request.

In 1856, the residents of Honey Lake Valley reckoned the 120th meridian to be west of their valley, placing them in Utah territory, and attempted to secede and form a territory they called Nataqua. Nataqua would have included Modoc County. In 1858, the Territory of Nevada, with its capital now in Carson City, seceded from Utah, and assumed jurisdiction to the summit of the Sierra Nevada until the 120th meridian was surveyed in 1863. After Nevada was granted statehood in 1864, the region of current Modoc County was placed within jurisdiction of Shasta County, California, and Siskiyou County was, in turn, generated from Shasta County in 1852.

Increasing traffic on the emigrant trail, unprovoked militia raids on innocent Modoc, and a cycle of retaliatory raids increased a cycle of violence between settlers and the tribes in the area. In 1864, the Klamath, Modoc and Yahooskin band of the Shoshone signed a treaty ceding lands in both Oregon and California, and the tribes were colocated on the Klamath Reservation. Harassed by the Klamath, traditional competitors, a band of Modoc led by Captain Jack returned to California and the Tule Lake area.

The Modoc War or Lava Beds War of 1872–73 brought nationwide attention to the Modoc. From strong defensive positions in the lava tubes, 52 Modoc warriors held off hundreds of US Army forces, who called in artillery to help. Peace talks in 1873 stalled when the Modoc wanted their own reservation in California. Warriors urged killing the peace commissioners, thinking the Americans would then leave, and Captain Jack and others shot and killed General Edward Canby and Rev. Eleazer Thomas, as well as wounding others. More Army troops were called in to lay siege to Captain Jack's Stronghold. Dissension arose, and some Modoc surrendered. Finally, most were captured, and those responsible for the assassinations were tried and executed. More than 150 Modoc were transported to Indian Territory as prisoners of war. The area has since been designated the Lava Beds National Monument.

Settlement of the county began in earnest in the 1870s, with the timber, gold, agriculture, and railroad industries bringing most of the settlers into the area. The county was a crossroads for the Lassen Applegate Trail, which brought settlers north from Nevada to the Oregon Trail and south to trails leading into California's central valley. Early settlers included the Dorris, Belli, Essex, Scherer, Trumbo, Flournoy, Polander, Rice and Campbell families.

Modoc County was formed when Governor Newton Booth signed an Act of the California Legislature on February 17, 1874, after residents of the Surprise Valley region lobbied for the creation of a new county from eastern Siskiyou County land. The county residents considered naming the newly formed county after Canby, whom the Modoc had killed the previous year in an ambush at peace talks. The name Summit was also considered, but the populace eventually settled on Modoc. The war was over and 153 of Captain Jack's band had been transported to Indian Territory as prisoners.

The Dorris Bridge post office opened in 1871 and was renamed Dorrisville in 1874. Due to its central location, it became the county seat when Modoc County formed that year, although both Adin and Cedarville were larger towns. In 1876, it was renamed Alturas, Spanish for "The Heights". The 1880 census showed a population of 148. Settlement continued for the next 20 years, until the city was officially incorporated on September 16, 1901 (the county's only incorporated city).

Tule Lake Segregation Center historical marker

During World War II, the US government developed several thousand acres just south of Newell as a Japanese American internment camp. Tule Lake War Relocation Center was the site of temporary exile for thousands of Japanese-American citizens, who lost most of their businesses and properties where they had formerly lived in coastal areas. A historical marker marks the site along California State Route 139 in Newell. Tule Lake was the largest of the "segregation camps." On November 8, 2005, Senator Dianne Feinstein called for the camp to be designated a National Historic Landmark. In December 2008 President George W. Bush designated it one of nine sites to be part of the new World War II Valor in the Pacific National Monument, now the Tule Lake National Monument.

== Geography ==
According to the U.S. Census Bureau, Modoc County spans a total area of 4,203 square miles (10,890 km^{2}), of which 3,918 square miles (10,150 km^{2}) is land, with 286 square miles (740 km^{2}) (6.8%) water. There are 2.25 persons per square mile, making Modoc one of the least-populated counties in the state of California. In terms of its county lines, Modoc is one of the only nearly-rectangular counties in California; a slight deviation occurs around the Tule Lake National Wildlife Refuge.

Geologically, Modoc County is quite unique. The area's tumultuous seismic past has set the stage for a productive, diverse regional ecology today; a rich soil composition, largely created by ancient volcanoes dispersing vast amounts of minerals, stands out from the typically bland, clay-heavy terrain common in the American west. To the northwest of the county lies Medicine Lake—the largest shield volcano on the U.S. West Coast—and Lava Beds National Monument. In west Modoc County is the massive Glass Mountain, another ancient lava flow. The southwestern quadrant of the county is a unique ecosystem of isolated hardwoods (oaks) and volcanic mountains with intermountain river valleys.

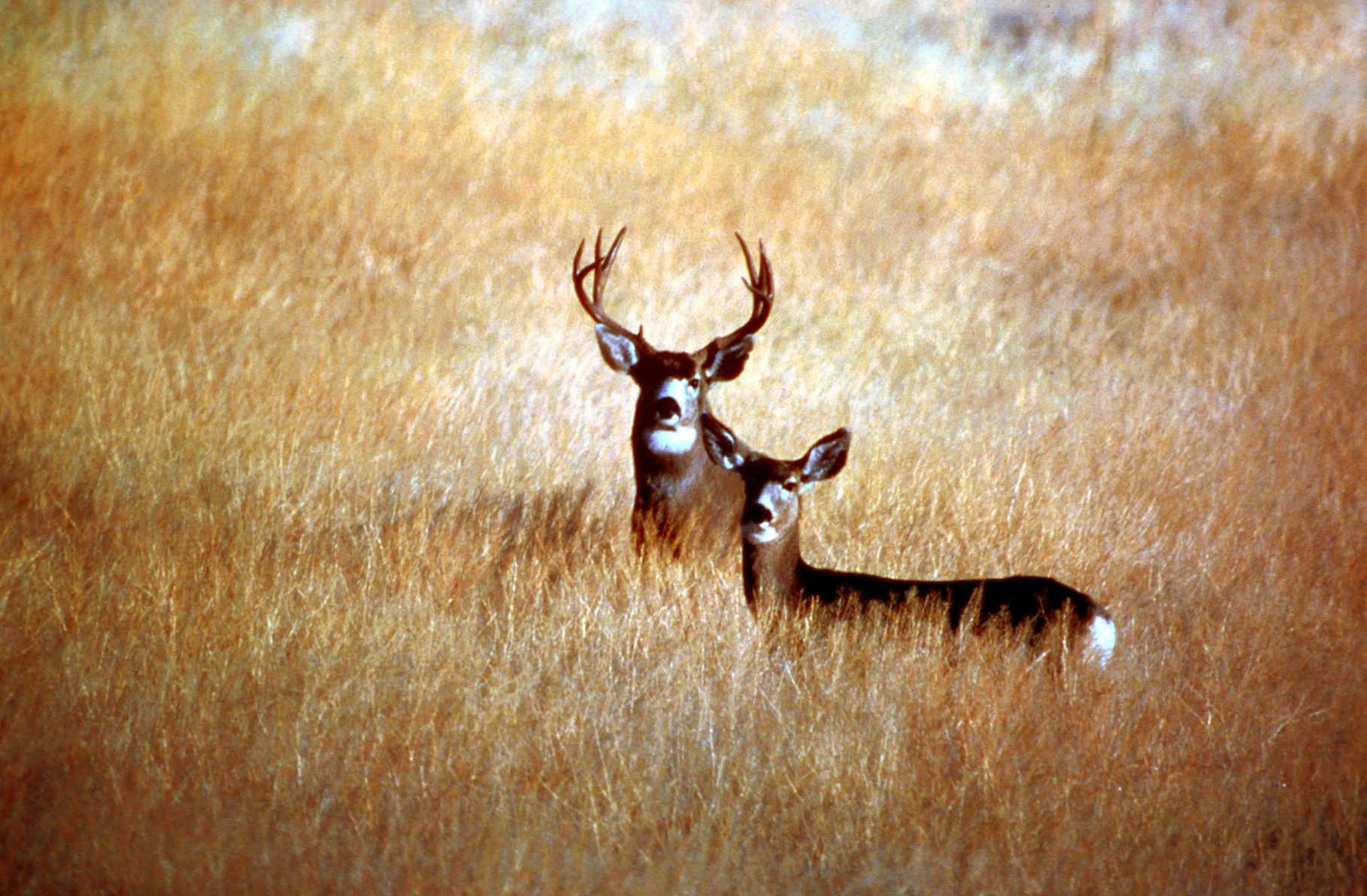
Mule deer in Modoc County

The northern half of the county is primarily the Modoc Plateau, a 1-mile-high (1.6 km) expanse of lava flows, cinder cones, juniper flats, pine forests and seasonal lakes, including the alkaline waters of Goose Lake. Nearly 1 million acres (4,000 km^{2}) of the Modoc National Forest lie on the plateau between Medicine Lake, to the west, and the Warner Mountains, to the east.

A great diversity of plants are found in Modoc County. As it is situated within the biodiverse California Floristic Province, many native trees are found in the county, including Garry oak (Quercus garryana) and Washoe pine (Pinus washoensis). Pinus jeffreyi and P. ponderosa (the Jeffrey and ponderosa pines, respectively) are also found in substantial groves. The rich plant life supports substantial populations of mule deer (Odocoileus hemionus), Rocky Mountain elk (Cervus canadensis) and pronghorn (Antilocapra americana), as well as several herds of feral horses (Equus ferus). Clear Lake National Wildlife Refuge and Long Bell State Game Refuge are located on the plateau, as well. The Lost River, which later drains into the Klamath River basin, drains the northern part of the plateau; southern watersheds either collect in basin reservoirs or flow into the Big Sage Reservoir, in the center of the county (which later flows into the Pit River).

Below the rim of the plateau, in the extreme southwest corner of the county, are Big Valley and Warm Springs Valley, which form the bottom of the Pit River watershed that flows through the county. The Pit River's northern and southern forks come together just south of Alturas; the river collects hundreds of other small creeks on its trajectory south towards Shasta Lake, where it joins the Sacramento River and ultimately drains into San Francisco Bay. The eastern edge of the county is dominated by the Warner Mountains. The Pit River originates in this mountain range. Hundreds of alpine lakes dot the range, all of which are fed by snowmelt and natural springs. East of the Warner Range is Surprise Valley and the western edge of the Great Basin.

Hot springs and lava caves are unique to Modoc County. There is potential for some geothermal energy resources in the county, though the viability is highly variable.

=== Adjacent counties ===
- Klamath County, Oregon - north
- Lake County, Oregon - north
- Washoe County, Nevada - east
- Lassen County - south
- Shasta County - southwest
- Siskiyou County - west

=== National protected areas ===
- Clear Lake National Wildlife Refuge
- Lava Beds National Monument (part)
- Modoc National Forest (part)
- Shasta National Forest (part)
- Modoc National Wildlife Refuge (part)
- Tule Lake National Wildlife Refuge (part)
- Tule Lake Unit, World War II Valor in the Pacific National Monument (part)

== Demographics ==
=== Racial and ethnic composition ===
Modoc County, California – Racial and ethnic composition Note: the US Census treats Hispanic/Latino as an ethnic category. This table excludes Latinos from the racial categories and assigns them to a separate category. Hispanics/Latinos may be of any race.
Race / Ethnicity (NH = Non-Hispanic)	Pop 1980	Pop 1990	Pop 2000	Pop 2010	Pop 2020	% 1980	% 1990	% 2000	% 2010	% 2020
White alone (NH)	7,854	8,479	7,663	7,649	6,446	91.22%	87.61%	81.10%	78.97%	74.09%
Black or African American alone (NH)	14	78	59	77	66	0.16%	0.81%	0.62%	0.79%	0.76%
Native American or Alaska Native alone (NH)	346	378	340	293	387	4.02%	3.91%	3.60%	3.02%	4.45%
Asian alone (NH)	24	35	58	70	61	0.28%	0.36%	0.61%	0.72%	0.70%
Native Hawaiian or Pacific Islander alone (NH)	x	x	7	21	13	0.07%	0.22%	0.07%	0.22%	0.15%
Other race alone (NH)	16	7	26	14	56	0.19%	0.07%	0.28%	0.14%	0.64%
Mixed race or Multiracial (NH)	x	x	208	220	412	x	x	2.20%	2.27%	4.74%
Hispanic or Latino (any race)	356	701	1,088	1,342	1,259	4.13%	7.24%	11.51%	13.86%	14.47%
Total	8,610	9,678	9,449	9,686	8,700	100.00%	100.00%	100.00%	100.00%	100.00%

=== American Community Survey 2025 data ===
The United States Census Bureau estimated that in 2025, Modoc County’s population was 8.426. It was also estimated that the county's population was 70,00% Non-Hispanic White, 17,85% Hispanic or Latino, 0,89% Non-Hispanic Black, 1,14% Asian, 4,57% Native American, 0,42% Pacific Islander, and 5,14% Multiracial.

Total	Population	Percentage
Non-Hispanic White	5.898	70,00%
Hispanic or Latino	1.504	17,85%
Non-Hispanic Black	75	0,89%
Asian	96	1,14%
Native American	385	4,57%
Pacific Islander	35	0,42%
Non-Hispanic Multiracial	433	5,14%

Historical population
Census	Pop.	Note	%±
1880	4,399		—
1890	4,986		13.3%
1900	5,076		1.8%
1910	6,191		22.0%
1920	5,425		−12.4%
1930	8,038		48.2%
1940	8,713		8.4%
1950	9,678		11.1%
1960	8,308		−14.2%
1970	7,469		−10.1%
1980	8,610		15.3%
1990	9,678		12.4%
2000	9,449		−2.4%
2010	9,686		2.5%
2020	8,700		−10.2%
2025 (est.)	8,426	▼	−3.1%
U.S. Decennial Census; 1790–1960 1900–1990; 1990–2000 2010–2015

=== 2020 census ===
As of the 2020 census, the county had a population of 8,700. The median age was 48.7 years. 20.6% of residents were under the age of 18 and 26.7% of residents were 65 years of age or older. For every 100 females there were 99.9 males, and for every 100 females age 18 and over there were 99.9 males age 18 and over.

0.0% of residents lived in urban areas, while 100.0% lived in rural areas.

There were 3,732 households in the county, of which 26.5% had children under the age of 18 living with them and 26.2% had a female householder with no spouse or partner present. About 31.4% of all households were made up of individuals and 17.0% had someone living alone who was 65 years of age or older.

There were 4,752 housing units, of which 21.5% were vacant. Among occupied housing units, 69.5% were owner-occupied and 30.5% were renter-occupied. The homeowner vacancy rate was 2.8% and the rental vacancy rate was 6.9%.

=== 2010 census ===
The 2010 United States census reported that Modoc County had a population of 9,686. The racial makeup of Modoc County was 8,084 (83.5%) White, 82 (0.8%) African American, 370 (3.8%) Native American, 78 (0.8%) Asian, 21 (0.2%) Pacific Islander, 680 (7.0%) from other races, and 371 (3.8%) from two or more races. Hispanic or Latino of any race were 1,342 persons (13.9%).

Population reported at 2010 United States census
The County	Total; Population	White	African; American	Native; American	Asian	Pacific; Islander	other races	two or more races	Hispanic or Latino (of any race)
Modoc County	9,686	8,084	82	370	78	21	680	371	1,342
Incorporated city	Total; Population	White	African; American	Native; American	Asian	Pacific; Islander	other races	two or more races	Hispanic or Latino (of any race)
Alturas	2,827	2,430	15	81	45	7	118	131	347
Census-designated place	Total; Population	White	African; American	Native; American	Asian	Pacific; Islander	other races	two or more races	Hispanic or Latino (of any race)
Adin	272	240	2	8	0	0	9	13	32
California Pines	520	416	11	16	6	2	33	36	83
Canby	315	292	2	7	1	0	9	4	24
Cedarville	514	422	1	15	0	0	59	17	86
Daphnedale Park	184	166	2	6	0	4	2	4	18
Eagleville	59	58	0	0	0	0	1	0	2
Fort Bidwell	173	75	2	76	0	0	10	10	23
Lake City	61	58	0	0	0	0	0	3	0
Likely	63	57	0	5	0	0	0	1	6
Lookout	84	76	0	2	0	0	5	1	14
New Pine Creek	98	89	0	0	0	1	0	8	4
Newell	449	199	2	23	1	5	193	26	271
Other unincorporated areas	Total; Population	White	African; American	Native; American	Asian	Pacific; Islander	other races	two or more races	Hispanic or Latino (of any race)
All others not CDPs (combined)	4,067	3,506	45	131	25	2	241	117	432

=== 2000 census ===
As of the census of 2000, there were 9,449 people, 3,784 households, and 2,550 families residing in the county. The population density was 2 people per square mile (0.77 people/km^{2}). There were 4,807 housing units at an average density of 1 units per square mile (0.39 units/km^{2}). The racial makeup of the county was 85.9% White, 0.7% Black or African American, 4.2% American Indian, 0.6% Asian, 0.1% Pacific Islander, 5.7% from other races, and 2.8% from two or more races. 11.5% of the population were Hispanic or Latino of any race. The largest ethnicity/ancestry groups in Modoc county include: 15% English, 14% Irish and 13% German of whom 90.4% spoke English and 8.8% Spanish as their first language.

There were 3,784 households, out of which 29.1% had children under the age of 18 living with them, 54.6% were married couples living together, 8.8% had a female householder with no husband present, and 32.6% were non-families. 28.1% of all households were made up of individuals, and 12.7% had someone living alone who was 65 years of age or older. The average household size was 2.39 and the average family size was 2.91. In the county, the population was spread out, with 25.6% under the age of 18, 5.7% from 18 to 24, 23.3% from 25 to 44, 27.7% from 45 to 64, and 17.6% who were 65 years of age or older. The median age was 42 years. For every 100 females, there were 102.4 males. For every 100 females age 18 and over, there were 98.7 males.

The median income for a household in the county was $27,522, and the median income for a family was $35,978. Males had a median income of $30,538 versus $23,438 for females. The per capita income for the county was $17,285. About 16.4% of families and 21.5% of the population were below the poverty line, including 29.7% of those under age 18 and 8.6% of those age 65 or over. Modoc County has the lowest median household income of any county in California. In 2005, the median home price reached $100,000 for the first time ever, over a 40% increase since 2000. Much of this can be traced to an influx of residents from other parts of the state, who find the housing bargains attractive. Some of these are retirees who have sold their houses for large profits in other parts of the state, using the proceeds to live on, while others are remote workers. This sudden rise in housing prices become unaffordable for locals, who find themselves unable to purchase homes given their limited incomes.

== Politics ==
Federally, Modoc County is in California's 1st congressional district, represented by Republican James Gallagher. In the state legislature Modoc is in the 1st senatorial district, represented by Republican Megan Dahle, and the 1st Assembly district, represented by Republican Heather Hadwick. For much of the 20th century, Modoc County was a bellwether county for statewide elections in California, voting for the statewide winner in every election between 1912 and 1990 with the exception of Jerry Brown's 2 statewide victories (the county's dislike of Brown is attributable to his environmental policies negatively affecting the county's logging industry).

Recently, though, Modoc County has trended Republican, becoming one of the most conservative counties in the state. On November 4, 2008, Modoc County delivered the most lopsided vote in favor of John McCain of any county in California, with 67.4% of voters opting for the Republican. The county also voted 74.2% in favor of Proposition 8 which amended the California Constitution to ban same-sex marriages; only Kern and Tulare counties voted in higher proportion, both opting for the Proposition with 75.4% of the vote. In the 2021 California gubernatorial recall election, Modoc and neighboring Lassen County voted the most strongly in favor of recalling Newsom of any counties in the state. On September 24, 2013, the Modoc County Board of Supervisors voted 4–0 in favor of secession from California to form a proposed state named Jefferson.

=== Voter registration ===
Population and registered voters
Total population	9,587	
Registered voters (Note: Percentage of registered voters with respect to total population. Percentages of party members with respect to registered voters follow.)	5,273	55.0%
Democratic	1,364	25.9%
Republican	2,634	50.0%
Democratic–Republican spread	-1,270	-24.1%
Independent	262	5.0%
Green	21	0.4%
Libertarian	45	0.9%
Peace and Freedom	6	0.1%
Americans Elect	0	0.0%
Other	10	0.2%
No party preference	931	17.7%

==== Cities by population and voter registration ====
Cities by population and voter registration
City	Population	Registered voters	Democratic	Republican	D–R spread	Other	No party preference
Alturas	2,813	54.7%	31.0%	42.4%	-11.4%	12.9%	19.5%

=== Historical election results ===
United States presidential election results for Modoc County, California
Year	Republican		Democratic		Third party(ies)	
Year	No.	%	No.	%	No.	%
1892	406	35.46%	596	52.05%	143	12.49%
1896	300	33.00%	588	64.69%	21	2.31%
1900	446	44.78%	532	53.41%	18	1.81%
1904	559	53.91%	444	42.82%	34	3.28%
1908	620	49.92%	574	46.22%	48	3.86%
1912	1	0.06%	941	54.90%	772	45.04%
1916	768	36.61%	1,222	58.25%	108	5.15%
1920	992	62.59%	535	33.75%	58	3.66%
1924	731	43.72%	374	22.37%	567	33.91%
1928	942	56.75%	711	42.83%	7	0.42%
1932	655	27.45%	1,643	68.86%	88	3.69%
1936	968	34.19%	1,828	64.57%	35	1.24%
1940	1,371	37.77%	2,232	61.49%	27	0.74%
1944	1,288	45.40%	1,540	54.28%	9	0.32%
1948	1,480	46.54%	1,607	50.53%	93	2.92%
1952	2,634	61.36%	1,633	38.04%	26	0.61%
1956	1,981	53.21%	1,729	46.44%	13	0.35%
1960	1,839	51.80%	1,691	47.63%	20	0.56%
1964	1,386	41.27%	1,972	58.73%	0	0.00%
1968	1,713	52.43%	1,264	38.69%	290	8.88%
1972	2,085	58.49%	1,271	35.65%	209	5.86%
1976	1,917	51.20%	1,733	46.29%	94	2.51%
1980	2,579	64.47%	1,046	26.15%	375	9.38%
1984	2,995	69.49%	1,219	28.28%	96	2.23%
1988	2,518	62.68%	1,416	35.25%	83	2.07%
1992	1,803	38.98%	1,489	32.19%	1,333	28.82%
1996	2,285	53.10%	1,368	31.79%	650	15.11%
2000	2,969	72.29%	945	23.01%	193	4.70%
2004	3,235	72.42%	1,149	25.72%	83	1.86%
2008	2,981	67.44%	1,313	29.71%	126	2.85%
2012	2,777	69.67%	1,111	27.87%	98	2.46%
2016	2,696	71.17%	877	23.15%	215	5.68%
2020	3,109	71.59%	1,150	26.48%	84	1.93%
2024	2,884	71.81%	1,008	25.10%	124	3.09%

== Crime ==
The following table includes the number of incidents reported and the rate per 1,000 persons for each type of offense:

Population and crime rates
Population	9,587	
Violent crime	10	1.04
Homicide	0	0.00
Forcible rape	1	0.10
Robbery	0	0.00
Aggravated assault	9	0.94
Property crime	76	7.93
Burglary	44	4.59
Larceny-theft	69	7.20
Motor vehicle theft	7	0.73
Arson	1	0.10

=== Cities by population and crime rates ===
Cities by population and crime rates
City	Population	Violent crimes	Violent crime rate per 1,000 persons	Property crimes	Property crime rate per 1,000 persons
Alturas	2,802	36	12.85	62	22.13

== Transportation ==
=== Major highways ===
- U.S. Route 395
- State Route 139
- State Route 299

Additionally, the eastern Modoc County communities of Eagleville, Cedarville, Lake City, and Fort Bidwell are connected via Surprise Valley Road, which runs from the southern county line to the Oregon border.

=== Public transportation ===
The Sage Stage is a dial-a-ride service providing trips within Modoc County. It also provides service to Klamath Falls, Oregon and Reno, Nevada, as well as connections to and from Reno International Airport, outside of Door D.

=== Airports ===
There are general aviation airports near Alturas (Alturas Municipal Airport and California Pines Airport). Other airports include Cedarville Airport, Eagleville Airport, Fort Bidwell Airport, and Tulelake Municipal Airport. The closest major airport is in Reno.

== Communities ==
=== City ===
- Alturas (county seat)

=== Census-designated places ===
- Adin
- California Pines
- Canby
- Cedarville
- Daphnedale Park
- Eagleville
- Fort Bidwell
- Lake City
- Likely
- Lookout
- Newell
- New Pine Creek

=== Other unincorporated places ===
- Davis Creek
- Tionesta

=== Population ranking ===
The population ranking of the following table is based on the 2020 census of Modoc County.

† county seat

Rank	City/Town/etc.	Municipal type	Population (2020 Census)
1	† Alturas	City	2,715
2	California Pines	CDP	473
3	Cedarville	CDP	437
4	Newell	CDP	301
5	Adin	CDP	205
6	Canby	CDP	183
7	Fort Bidwell	CDP	180
8	Daphnedale Park	CDP	129
9	XL Ranch Rancheria	AIAN	117
10	Fort Bidwell Reservation	AIAN	97
11	New Pine Creek	CDP	87
12	Lake City	CDP	71
13	Lookout	CDP	68
14	Likely	CDP	53
15	Eagleville	CDP	45
16	Cedarville Rancheria	AIAN	19
17	Lookout Rancheria	AIAN	11
18	Alturas Indian Rancheria	AIAN	3
19	Likely Rancheria	AIAN	0

== Education ==
School districts include:

- Big Valley Joint Unified School District
- Fall River Joint Unified School District
- Modoc Joint Unified School District
- Surprise Valley Joint Unified School District
- Tulelake Basin Joint Unified School District

== See also ==
- Modoc County Historical Museum
- List of school districts in Modoc County, California
- National Register of Historic Places listings in Modoc County, California
