= California Pines, California =

- census-designated place
- Location of California Pines in Modoc County, California.

- Location in California
- Coordinates: 41°24′36″N 120°40′45″W
- Country: United States
- State: California
- County: Modoc

Area
  - Total: 7.57 sq mi (19.60 km^{2})
  - Land: 7.43 sq mi (19.24 km^{2})
  - Water: 0.14 sq mi (0.37 km^{2}) 1.87%
- Elevation: 4,406 ft (1,343 m)

Population (2020)
  - Total: 473
  - Density: 63.7/sq mi (24.59/km^{2})
- Time zone: UTC-8 (Pacific (PST))
  - Summer (DST): UTC-7 (PDT)
- ZIP code: 96101
- Area codes: 530, 837
- GNIS feature ID: 1947700; 2582955

California Pines is a census-designated place in Modoc County, California, United States. It lies at an elevation of 4406 feet (1343 m). Its population is 473 as of the 2020 census, down from 520 from the 2010 census.

== Geography ==
According to the United States Census Bureau, the CDP covers an area of 7.6 square miles (19.6 km^{2}), of which 98.13% is land and 1.87% is water.

== Demographics ==
Historical population
| Census | Pop. | Note | %± |
|---|---|---|---|
| 2010 | 520 | | — |
| 2020 | 473 | | −9.0% |
U.S. Decennial Census; 1850–1870 1880-1890; 1900 1910 1920; 1930 1940 1950; 1960 1970 1980; 1990 2000 2010

=== 2020 census ===
As of the 2020 census, California Pines had a population of 473, with a population density of 63.7 inhabitants per square mile (24.6/km^{2}). 0.0% of residents lived in urban areas, while 100.0% lived in rural areas.

The age distribution was 101 people (21.4%) under the age of 18, 28 people (5.9%) aged 18 to 24, 104 people (22.0%) aged 25 to 44, 130 people (27.5%) aged 45 to 64, and 110 people (23.3%) who were 65 years of age or older. The median age was 46.5 years. For every 100 females, there were 116.0 males, and for every 100 females age 18 and over, there were 116.3 males age 18 and over.

Racial composition as of the 2020 census
| Race | Number | Percent |
|---|---|---|
| White | 384 | 81.2% |
| Black or African American | 0 | 0.0% |
| American Indian and Alaska Native | 11 | 2.3% |
| Asian | 3 | 0.6% |
| Native Hawaiian and Other Pacific Islander | 2 | 0.4% |
| Some other race | 31 | 6.6% |
| Two or more races | 42 | 8.9% |
| Hispanic or Latino (of any race) | 74 | 15.6% |

There were 192 households in California Pines, of which 30.7% had children under the age of 18 living in them. Of all households, 52.1% were married-couple households, 11 (5.7%) were cohabiting couple households, 25.5% were households with a male householder and no spouse or partner present, and 16.7% were households with a female householder and no spouse or partner present. About 28.1% of all households were made up of individuals and 16.7% had someone living alone who was 65 years of age or older. The average household size was 2.46. There were 123 families (64.1% of all households).

There were 241 housing units at an average density of 32.4 units per square mile (12.5 units/km^{2}), of which 192 (79.7%) were occupied. Of these, 152 (79.2%) were owner-occupied, and 40 (20.8%) were occupied by renters. The homeowner vacancy rate was 3.8% and the rental vacancy rate was 0.0%.

=== 2010 census ===
California Pines first appeared as a census designated place in the 2010 U.S. census.

== Politics ==
In the state legislature, California Pines is in the 1st senatorial district, represented by Republican Megan Dahle, and the 1st Assembly district, represented by Republican Heather Hadwick.

Federally, California Pines is in California's 1st congressional district, represented by Republican James Gallagher.

== Education ==
Modoc Joint Unified School District is the local school district.
