= Fort Bidwell, California =

Fort Bidwell
- Census-designated place
- Location of Fort Bidwell in Modoc County, California.

- Location in California
- Coordinates: 41°51′38″N 120°09′05″W
- Country: United States
- State: California
- County: Modoc

Area
  - Total: 3.221 sq mi (8.343 km^{2})
  - Land: 3.204 sq mi (8.299 km^{2})
  - Water: 0.017 sq mi (0.044 km^{2}) 0.52%
- Elevation: 4,564 ft (1,391 m)

Population (2020)
  - Total: 180
  - Density: 56/sq mi (22/km^{2})
- Time zone: UTC-8 (Pacific (PST))
  - Summer (DST): UTC-7 (PDT)
- ZIP Code: 96112
- Area codes: 530, 837
- GNIS feature IDs: 1656026; 2583014

California Historical Landmark
- Reference no.: 430

Fort Bidwell (Northern Paiute: yammussu) is a census-designated place in Modoc County, California, United States. It is located 32 miles (51 km) northeast of Alturas, at an elevation of 4564 feet (1391 m). Its population is 180 as of the 2020 census, up from 173 from the 2010 census.

== History ==
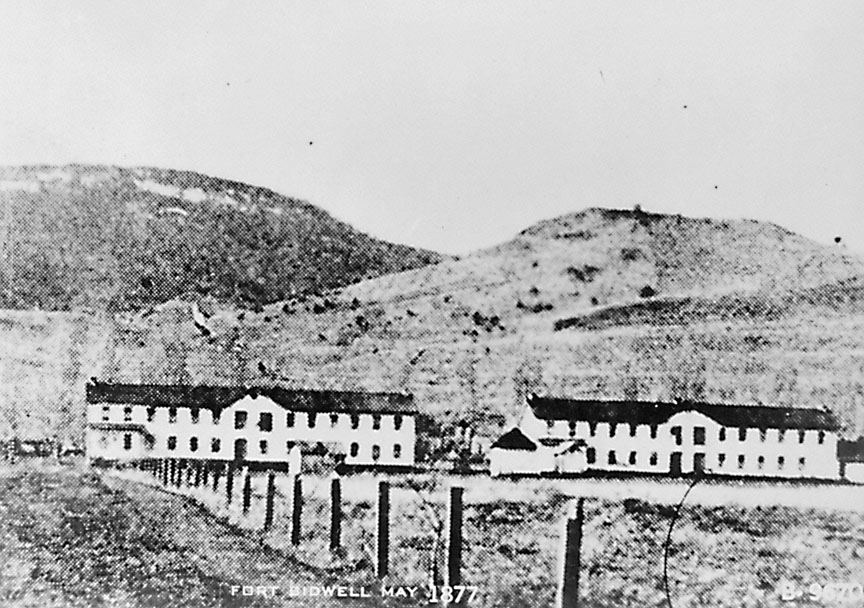
Fort Bidwell in 1877

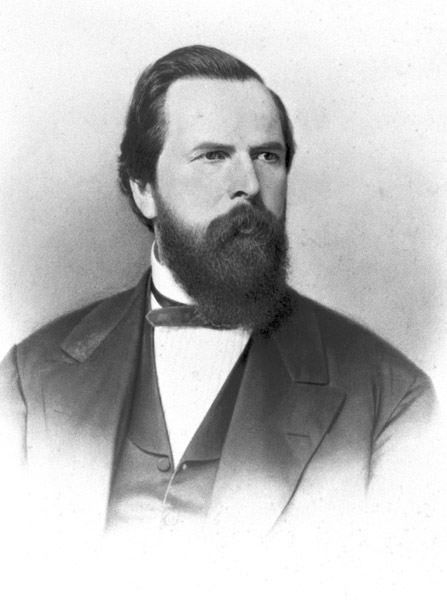
John Bidwell in 1860

In 1865, General John Bidwell backed a petition from settlers at Red Bluff, California to protect Red Bluff's trail to the Owhyhee Mines of Idaho. The U.S. Army commissioned seven forts for this purpose, and dispatched a Major Williamson in April to explore a site for a fort in either Goose Lake Valley or Surprise Valley, from which he selected a site near Fandango Pass at the base of the Warner Mountains in the north end of Surprise Valley, and orders to build the fort were issued on June 10, 1865. Although Surprise Valley settlers desired Army protection, ranchers dispossessed of lands for the fort complained, and claimed damages from the Army.

The fort was built in 1865 amid escalating fighting with the Snake Indians of eastern Oregon and southern Idaho. It was a base for operations in the Snake War that lasted until 1868, the Battle of Infernal Caverns in 1867 with General George Crook, the Modoc War of 1872–73 and the Bannock and Nez Perce campaigns. Although traffic dwindled on the Red Bluff route once the Central Pacific Railroad extended into Nevada in 1868, the Army staffed Fort Bidwell to quell various uprisings and disturbances until 1890.

Both Fort Bidwell and Camp Bidwell, near Chico were named for General John Bidwell. However, Camp Bidwell was commissioned in 1863, renamed Camp Chico by the time Fort Bidwell was commissioned in 1865, and was decommissioned in 1865. Observing confusion between the two, Robert W. Pease explained that such a transfer of name between outposts was a common Army practice of the time.

The Fort Bidwell post office opened in 1868. A 1913 book described Fort Bidwell as having a population of about 200, and containing a school and reservation for the Northern Paiute Kidütökadö band (Gidu Ticutta - ‘Yellow-bellied marmot-Eaters’, also called "Northern California Paiute").

Fort Bidwell is now registered as California Historical Landmark #430.

== Geography ==
Fort Bidwell is located near the north end of the Surprise Valley. The community's ZIP Code is 96112 and elevation is about 4,564 feet (1,391 m). The coordinates for the town are 41°51′38″N 120°09′05″W. The airport, (FAA identifier: A28), is about 1-mile (1.6 km) north of the center of the community at 41°52′34″N 120°08′48″W. The Fort Bidwell Indian Community is affiliated with the Paiute nation.

According to the United States Census Bureau, the CDP covers an area of 3.2 square miles (8.3 km^{2}), of which 99.48% is land and 0.52% is water.

=== Climate ===
This region experiences warm (but not hot) and dry summers, with no average monthly temperatures above 71.6 °F. According to the Köppen Climate Classification system, Fort Bidwell has a warm-summer Mediterranean climate, abbreviated "Csb" on climate maps.

Climate data for Ft. Bidwell (1991–2020 normals, extremes 1870–1893, 1911–present)
Month	Jan	Feb	Mar	Apr	May	Jun	Jul	Aug	Sep	Oct	Nov	Dec	Year
Record high °F (°C)	75 (24)	76 (24)	87 (31)	85 (29)	97 (36)	105 (41)	106 (41)	105 (41)	102 (39)	95 (35)	78 (26)	79 (26)	106 (41)
Mean daily maximum °F (°C)	39.8 (4.3)	44.3 (6.8)	50.9 (10.5)	57.2 (14.0)	66.4 (19.1)	75.1 (23.9)	85.8 (29.9)	84.6 (29.2)	77.0 (25.0)	63.9 (17.7)	48.4 (9.1)	38.2 (3.4)	61.0 (16.1)
Daily mean °F (°C)	31.6 (−0.2)	34.9 (1.6)	40.4 (4.7)	45.2 (7.3)	53.3 (11.8)	60.6 (15.9)	69.6 (20.9)	68.0 (20.0)	60.9 (16.1)	49.9 (9.9)	38.4 (3.6)	30.3 (−0.9)	48.6 (9.2)
Mean daily minimum °F (°C)	23.3 (−4.8)	25.5 (−3.6)	29.8 (−1.2)	33.2 (0.7)	40.2 (4.6)	46.0 (7.8)	53.5 (11.9)	51.4 (10.8)	44.8 (7.1)	35.9 (2.2)	28.5 (−1.9)	22.4 (−5.3)	36.2 (2.3)
Record low °F (°C)	−26 (−32)	−22 (−30)	−6 (−21)	9 (−13)	19 (−7)	25 (−4)	27 (−3)	27 (−3)	17 (−8)	4 (−16)	−4 (−20)	−26 (−32)	−26 (−32)
Average precipitation inches (mm)	2.71 (69)	1.87 (47)	2.11 (54)	1.79 (45)	1.47 (37)	0.79 (20)	0.20 (5.1)	0.25 (6.4)	0.29 (7.4)	1.06 (27)	2.07 (53)	2.86 (73)	17.47 (444)
Average snowfall inches (cm)	15.1 (38)	11.0 (28)	6.2 (16)	3.2 (8.1)	0.5 (1.3)	0.0 (0.0)	0.0 (0.0)	0.0 (0.0)	0.2 (0.51)	0.3 (0.76)	6.5 (17)	12.9 (33)	55.9 (142)
Average precipitation days (≥ 0.01 in)	11.2	9.9	10.7	9.5	7.9	4.9	1.7	1.4	2.2	4.2	9.2	11.8	84.6
Average snowy days (≥ 0.1 in)	6.0	4.1	3.3	1.7	0.2	0.0	0.0	0.0	0.1	0.4	3.0	5.7	24.5
Source: NOAA

== Demographics ==
Historical population
Census	Pop.	Note	%±
2010	173		—
2020	180		4.0%
U.S. Decennial Census; 1850–1870 1880-1890; 1900 1910 1920; 1930 1940 1950; 1960 1970 1980; 1990 2000 2010

Fort Bidwell first appeared as a census designated place in the 2010 U.S. census.

The 2020 United States census reported that Fort Bidwell had a population of 180. The population density was 56.2 inhabitants per square mile (21.7/km^{2}). The racial makeup of Fort Bidwell was 89 (49.4%) White, 81 (45.0%) Native American, and 10 (5.6%) from two or more races. Hispanic or Latino of any race were 18 persons (10.0%).

The whole population lived in households. There were 94 households, out of which 34 (36.2%) had children under the age of 18 living in them, 34 (36.2%) were married-couple households, 12 (12.8%) were cohabiting couple households, 31 (33.0%) had a female householder with no partner present, and 17 (18.1%) had a male householder with no partner present. 25 households (26.6%) were one person, and 16 (17.0%) were one person aged 65 or older. The average household size was 1.91. There were 59 families (62.8% of all households).

The age distribution was 35 people (19.4%) under the age of 18, 9 people (5.0%) aged 18 to 24, 42 people (23.3%) aged 25 to 44, 44 people (24.4%) aged 45 to 64, and 50 people (27.8%) who were 65 years of age or older. The median age was 47.5 years. There were 97 males and 83 females.

There were 123 housing units at an average density of 38.4 units per square mile (14.8 units/km^{2}), of which 94 (76.4%) were occupied. Of these, 57 (60.6%) were owner-occupied, and 37 (39.4%) were occupied by renters.

== Politics ==
In the state legislature, Fort Bidwell is in the 1st senatorial district, represented by Republican Megan Dahle, and the 1st Assembly district, represented by Republican Heather Hadwick.

Federally, Fort Bidwell is in California's 1st congressional district, represented by Republican James Gallagher.

== Education ==
Surprise Valley Joint Unified School District is the local school district.

== See also ==
- Fort Bidwell Indian Community of the Fort Bidwell Reservation of California
