= Eagleville, California =

Eagleville
- census-designated place
- Location in California
- Coordinates: 41°18′59″N 120°06′57″W
- Country: United States
- State: California
- County: Modoc

Area
  - Total: 0.975 sq mi (2.525 km^{2})
  - Land: 0.975 sq mi (2.525 km^{2})
  - Water: 0 sq mi (0 km^{2}) 0%
- Elevation: 4,642 ft (1,415 m)

Population (2020)
  - Total: 45
  - Density: 46/sq mi (18/km^{2})
- Time zone: UTC-8 (Pacific (PST))
  - Summer (DST): UTC-7 (PDT)
- ZIP Code: 96110
- Area codes: 530, 837
- GNIS feature IDs: 1655985; 2628727

Eagleville is a census-designated place in Modoc County, California, United States. It is located 25 miles (40 km) east-southeast of Alturas, at an elevation of 4642 feet (1415 m). Its population is 45 as of the 2020 census, down from 59 from the 2010 census.

Located in Surprise Valley, Eagleville is a small community south of Cedarville. The ZIP code is 96110.

Wired telephone numbers in the community follow the format (530) 279-2xxx or 279-6xxx and appear to be served out of the Cedarville exchange. Wired telephone service is provided by Citizens Utilities. The Eagleville Airport, (FAA identifier: A22), is closed indefinitely as of winter 2000. FAA coordinates for the airport are 41°18′27″N 120°02′31″W. Elevation above mean sea level for the area was listed as roughly 4,640 feet (1,410 m).

== History ==
The first post office at Eagleville opened in 1868. A 1913 book described Eagleville as being in Modoc County, on one of the Alkali Lakes, and having a population of 150.

== Geography ==
According to the United States Census Bureau, the CDP covers an area of 1.0 square mile (2.5 km^{2}), all land.

== Demographics ==
Historical population
Census	Pop.	Note	%±
2010	59		—
2020	45		−23.7%
U.S. Decennial Census; 1850–1870 1880-1890; 1900 1910 1920; 1930 1940 1950; 1960 1970 1980; 1990 2000 2010

Eagleville first appeared as a census designated place in the 2010 U.S. census.

The 2020 United States census reported that Eagleville had a population of 45. The population density was 46.2 inhabitants per square mile (17.8/km^{2}). The racial makeup of Eagleville was 37 (82%) White, 3 (7%) Pacific Islander, and 5 (11%) from two or more races. Hispanic or Latino of any race were 3 persons (7%).

The whole population lived in households. There were 26 households, out of which 0 (0%) had children under the age of 18 living in them, 9 (35%) were married-couple households, 3 (12%) were cohabiting couple households, 12 (46%) had a female householder with no partner present, and 2 (8%) had a male householder with no partner present. 13 households (50%) were one person, and 11 (42%) were one person aged 65 or older. The average household size was 1.73. There were 10 families (38.5% of all households).

The age distribution was 3 people (7%) under the age of 18, 2 people (4%) aged 18 to 24, 5 people (11%) aged 25 to 44, 10 people (22%) aged 45 to 64, and 25 people (56%) who were 65 years of age or older. The median age was 65.8 years. There were 15 males and 30 females.

There were 47 housing units at an average density of 48.2 units per square mile (18.6 units/km^{2}), of which 26 (55.3%) were occupied. All of these were occupied by the homeowners, and none by renters.

== Notable person ==
Joseph Floyd "Arky" Vaughan (March 9, 1912 – August 30, 1952), an American professional baseball player. He played 14 seasons in Major League Baseball between 1932 and 1948 for the Pittsburgh Pirates and Brooklyn Dodgers, primarily as a shortstop. After his retirement from baseball, Vaughan owned a ranch near Eagleville; he drowned in an accident while fishing with a friend. Vaughan was elected to the National Baseball Hall of Fame in 1985.

== Education ==
Surprise Valley Joint Unified School District is the local school district.

== Politics ==
In the state legislature, Eagleville is in the 1st senatorial district, represented by Republican Megan Dahle, and the 1st Assembly district, represented by Republican Heather Hadwick.

Federally, Eagleville is in California's 1st congressional district, represented by Republican James Gallagher.
