= Fort Bidwell Indian Community of the Fort Bidwell Reservation of California =

Coordinates: 41°51′39″N 120°11′14″W

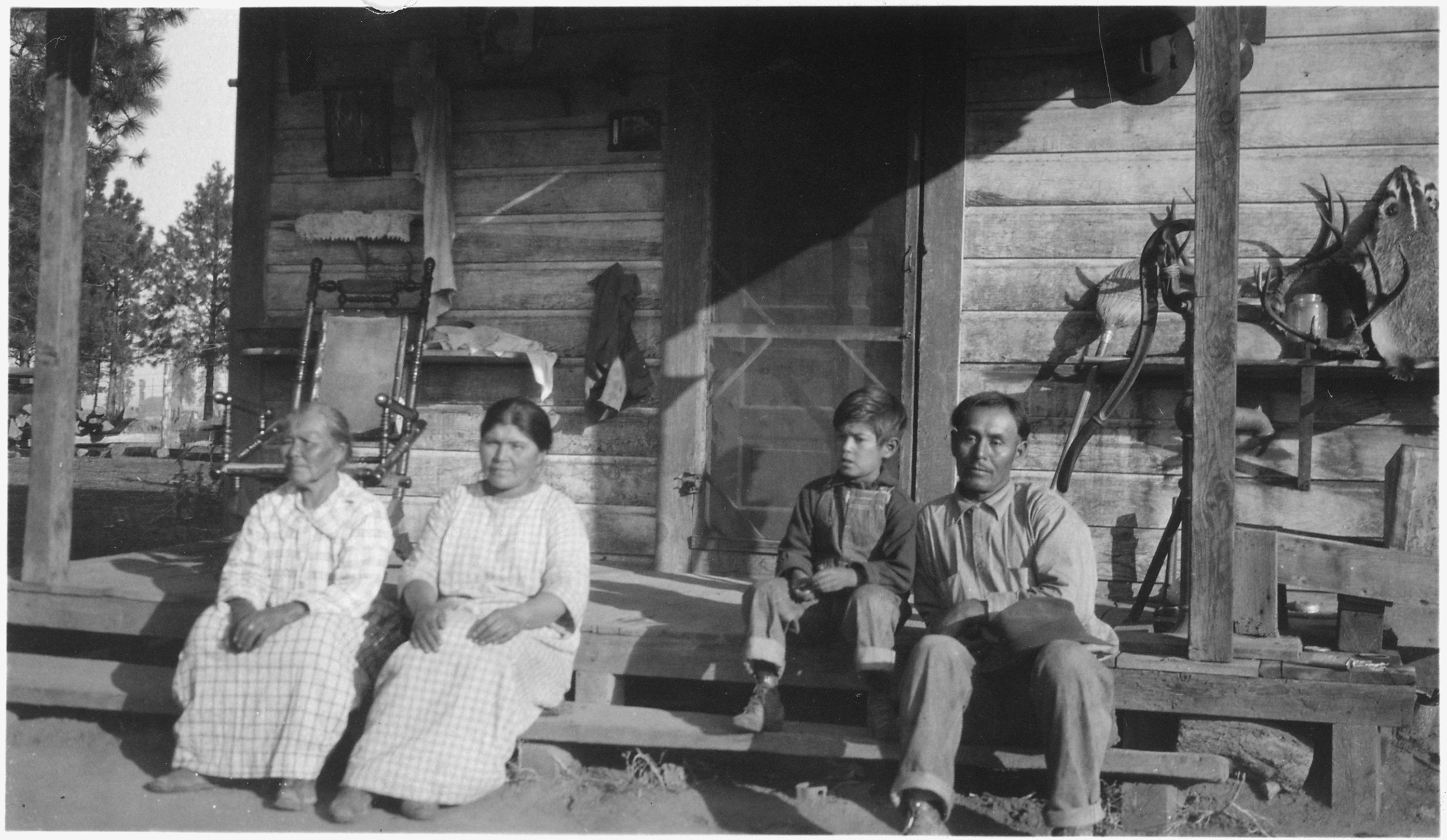
Group photograph sitting on the porch, at Fort Bidwell Reservation, c. 1924

The Fort Bidwell Indian Community of the Fort Bidwell Reservation of California (Northern Paiute: kidɨtɨkadɨ) is a federally recognized tribe of Northern Paiute Indians in Modoc County in the northeast corner of California.

== Background ==
The population as of 1969 was 112. The agency is the Northern California agency. The principal tribe is Paiute. They had laws and regulations, in order to establish a legal community organization and secure certain privileges and powers offered to us by the Indian Reorganization Act, they established a constitution and by-laws for the Fort Bidwell Indian Community. There were various laws placed on membership, territory, land as well as amendments.

== Reservation ==
Location of Fort Bidwell Reservation

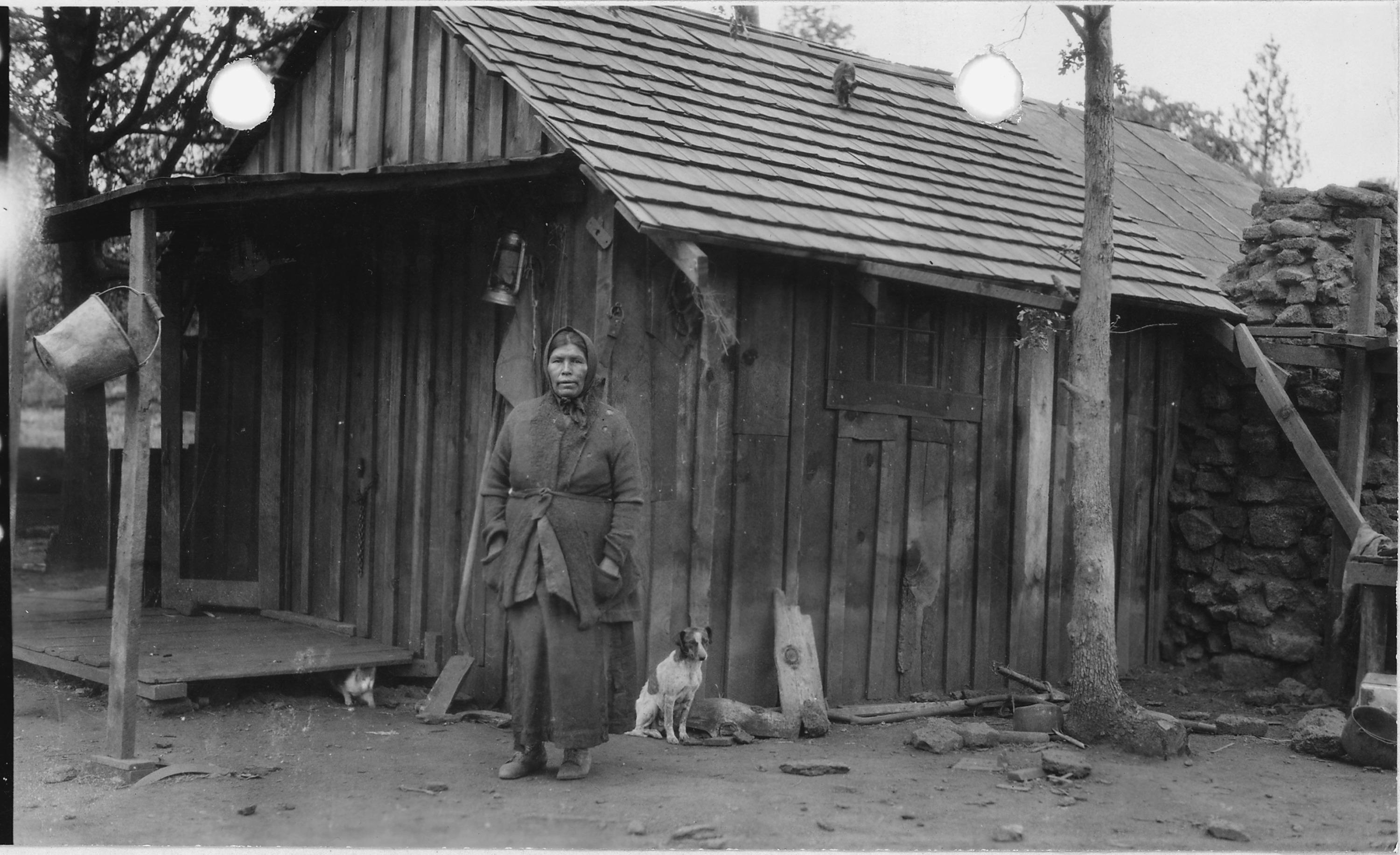
Grace Wolfin, c. 1924, Fort Bidwell Agency

The Fort Bidwell Indian Community has a federal reservation, the Fort Bidwell Reservation, in Modoc County, near the town of Fort Bidwell, California. The reservation is 3,335 acres (13.50 km^{2}) large. Approximately 108 tribal members live on the reservation. The reservation was established in 1897. In 1990 only 6 tribal members lived on the reservation. In 1992, 22 people were enrolled in the tribe. The tribal members are members the Northern Paiute Kidütökadö band (or kidɨtɨkadɨ, or Gidu Ticutta - ‘Yellow-bellied marmot-Eaters’, also called "Northern California Paiute").

== Language ==
The Fort Bidwell Indian Community traditionally spoke the Northern Paiute language, which is part of the Western Numic branch of the Uto-Aztecan language family. The language family is Numic, and the language phylum is Aztec-Tanoan. The word Numic comes from the cognate word in all Numic languages for "person". This language is still in use and also spoken fluently by the people of Fort Bidwell. This language is most closely related to the Mono language of California.

== Activities ==
For this tribe the activities include occasional marksmanship, which sometimes was played as competition. They have large areas of land which are used for farming, so that is another activity for the people of Fort Bidwell, California. Drumming, and family fun were the highlights of the celebrations held at the Fort Bidwell Indian reservation. The vendors sold food items, art work, and beading supplies at these celebrations. Dancing was also a common activity, in which women wore fancy shawls when dancing.

== Politics ==
In the state legislature, Fort Bidwell is in the 1st Senate District, represented by Republican Ted Gaines, and the 1st Assembly District, represented by Republican Brian Dahle. Federally, Fort Bidwell is in California's 1st congressional district, represented by Republican Doug LaMalfa. Fort Bidwell is now registered as California Historical Landmark #430. The tribal affiliation is Paiute Reservation. The Fort Bidwell Reservation Population within the reservation is around 124. Adjacent to the reservation there about 39 people. The land base is 1350 ha (3,335 acres). The tribal office is at PO Box 129, Fort Bidwell, CA 96112. A joint resolution of January 30, 1879, authorized the secretary of the interior to use the abandoned Fort Bidwell Military Reserve for an Indian Training School.

An act of January 27, 1913, granted land to the People's Church for a cemetery and right-of-way over the Fort Bidwell Indian School Reservation, the Indians to have right of interment therein. The Reservation was established by Executive Order on October 9, 1866. The Fort Bidwell community is of the Modoc County, California. The Tribal government was established on January 28, 1936, under the Indian Reorganization Act of 1934. The Tribe has approximately 350 members, although only about 160 currently reside on the Reservation.

== Today ==
The tribe's headquarters is located in Fort Bidwell, California. The tribe is governed by nine tribal council members that include a chairman, vice chairman, treasurer, secretary, and communications officer.

== Education ==
The reservation is served by the Surprise Valley Joint Unified School District.
