= Lake City, Modoc County, California =

Lake City
- census-designated place
- Location in California
- Coordinates: 41°38′34″N 120°13′01″W
- Country: United States
- State: California
- County: Modoc

Area
  - Total: 5.820 sq mi (15.074 km^{2})
  - Land: 5.817 sq mi (15.066 km^{2})
  - Water: 0.0031 sq mi (0.008 km^{2}) 0.05%
- Elevation: 4,630 ft (1,410 m)

Population (2020)
  - Total: 71
  - Density: 12/sq mi (4.7/km^{2})
- Time zone: UTC-8 (Pacific (PST))
  - Summer (DST): UTC-7 (PDT)
- ZIP Code: 96115
- Area codes: 530, 837
- GNIS feature IDs: 262284; 2583049

Lake City (formerly, Tri-Lake City) is a census-designated place in Modoc County, California, United States. It is located 8.5 miles (14 km) north-northwest of Cedarville, at an elevation of 4,626 feet (1,410 m). Its population is 71 as of the 2020 census, up from 61 from the 2010 census.

The first post office at Lake City opened in 1868. Lake City's ZIP Code is 96115.

A 1913 book described Lake City as being near Upper Alkali Lake and having a population of about 150.

The city is mentioned in the 1995 travel novel California Fault by author Thurston Clarke, when he referenced the area of Modoc County by his great-grandfather's travels in the 1850s in the Fandango Pass.

== Geography ==
According to the United States Census Bureau, the CDP covers an area of 5.8 square miles (15.1 km^{2}), 99.95% of it land, and 0.05% of it water.

== Demographics ==
Historical population
Census	Pop.	Note	%±
2010	61		—
2020	71		16.4%
U.S. Decennial Census; 2010

Lake City first appeared as a census designated place in the 2010 U.S. census.

The 2020 United States census reported that Lake City had a population of 71. The population density was 12.2 inhabitants per square mile (4.7/km^{2}). The racial makeup of Lake City was 65 (92%) White, 0 (0%) African American, 1 (1%) Native American, 0 (0%) Asian, 0 (0%) Pacific Islander, 0 (0%) from other races, and 5 (7%) from two or more races. Hispanic or Latino of any race were 4 persons (6%).

The whole population lived in households. There were 41 households, out of which 9 (22%) had children under the age of 18 living in them, 19 (46%) were married-couple households, 1 (2%) were cohabiting couple households, 11 (27%) had a female householder with no partner present, and 10 (24%) had a male householder with no partner present. 14 households (34%) were one person, and 11 (27%) were one person aged 65 or older. The average household size was 1.73. There were 24 families (59% of all households).

The age distribution was 15 people (21%) under the age of 18, 3 people (4%) aged 18 to 24, 12 people (17%) aged 25 to 44, 16 people (23%) aged 45 to 64, and 25 people (35%) who were 65 years of age or older. The median age was 53.2 years. There were 41 males and 30 females.

There were 44 housing units at an average density of 7.6 units per square mile (2.9 units/km^{2}), of which 41 (93%) were occupied. Of these, 27 (66%) were owner-occupied, and 14 (34%) were occupied by renters.

== Politics ==
In the state legislature, Lake City is in the 1st senatorial district, represented by Republican Megan Dahle, and the 1st Assembly district, represented by Republican Heather Hadwick.

Federally, Lake City is in California's 1st congressional district, represented by Republican James Gallagher.

== Education ==
Surprise Valley Joint Unified School District is the local school district.

== Notable people ==
- Former United States Army staff sergeant Clinton Romesha, a recipient of the Medal of Honor for actions during the Battle of Kamdesh in 2009 during the war in Afghanistan.
