= Buffalo Hills =

Mountain range in Nevada, United States

- Location within Nevada

Highest point
- Elevation: 1,902 m (6,240 ft)

Geography
- Country: United States
- State: Nevada
- District: Washoe County
- Range coordinates: 40°51′7.638″N 119°40′50.711″W
- Topo map: USGS Poodle Mountain

The Buffalo Hills are a mountain range in Washoe County, Nevada.
