= Cedarville, California =

Cedarville
- census-designated place
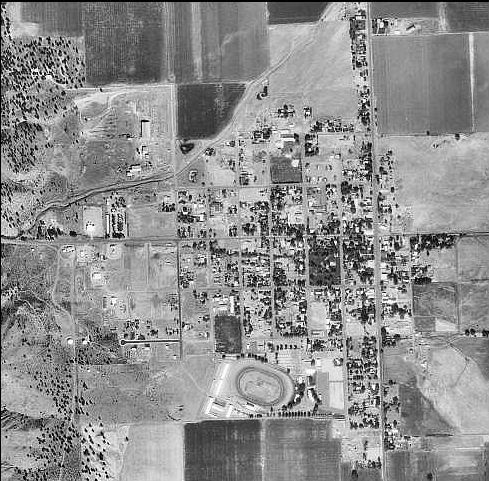
- Satellite Imagery of Cedarville, California. Taken on September 29, 1999.

- Location of Cedarville in Modoc County, California

- Location in the United States
- Coordinates: 41°31′45″N 120°10′24″W
- Country: United States
- State: California
- County: Modoc

Area
  - Total: 5.44 sq mi (14.10 km^{2})
  - Land: 5.44 sq mi (14.10 km^{2})
  - Water: 0.0039 sq mi (0.01 km^{2}) 0.08%
- Elevation: 4,652 ft (1,418 m)

Population (2020)
  - Total: 437
  - Density: 80/sq mi (31/km^{2})
- Time zone: UTC−8 (Pacific (PST))
  - Summer (DST): UTC−7 (PDT)
- ZIP Code: 96104
- Area codes: 530, 837
- GNIS feature ID: 220805; 2582971

Cedarville (formerly Surprise Valley and Deep Creek)(Northern Paiute: pasɨɨbi) is a census-designated place located 20 miles (32 km) east of Alturas, at an elevation of 4,652 feet (1,418 m), in Modoc County, California. Its population is 437 as of the 2020 census, down from 514 at the 2010 census.

== Geography ==
Cedarville is located at 41°31' North, 120°10' West (41.31, -120.17).

According to the United States Census Bureau, the CDP covers an area of 5.4 square miles (14 km^{2}), of which 99.92% is land and 0.08% is water.

The largest town in Surprise Valley, Cedarville is located on the alluvial apron at the mouth of Cedar Canyon, on the eastern base of the Warner Mountains, near the western shore of Middle Alkali Lake.

== History ==
Originally known as Deep Creek, Cedarville was founded around 1864 as a stopping place for wagon trains. In 1867 a trading post was being run by William Cressler and John Bonner, who later also built the first road over Cedar Pass, which connected Surprise Valley to Alturas and the rest of Modoc County.

The first post office opened in 1869. The current name is derived from Cedarville, Ohio. As branch county seat of Siskiyou County, nearby Lake City was the population center of Surprise Valley until Modoc County formed in 1874. However, by 1880 Cedarville was the largest town in the valley, with a population of around 220, and once Fort Bidwell, 20 miles (32 km) to the north, was demilitarized Cedarville's central location and access to Cedar Pass made it the natural population and business center of the valley.

A 1913 book described Cedarville as being on Middle Alkali Lake and having a population of about 500. The Laxague Lumber Company mill was located in Cedarville, and employed from 18 to 60 residents.

== California Historical Landmarks ==
Six miles (9.7 km) west of the city center on California State Route 299 is Bonner Grade, a California Historical Landmark.

California Historical Landmark number 15 reads:

NO. 15 BONNER GRADE - The first road from Cedarville to Alturas followed the course of the present highway over Warner Mountains from Surprise Valley. It was named in honor of John H. Bonner, who was instrumental in securing the construction of the road over Bonner Grade in 1869. The pass is a 6% grade between Bear Mountain and Payne Peak.

In Cedarville Park is California Historical Landmark number 14.

California Historical Landmark number 14 reads:

NO. 14 CRESSLER AND BONNER TRADING POST, 1865 - Cressler and Bonner started the first mercantile establishment in Modoc County here, in the first building erected in the town of Cedarville. They carried on a thriving business with emigrants en route to California and Oregon, and later with Surprise Valley settlers.

== Demographics ==
Historical population
Census	Pop.	Note	%±
2010	514		—
2020	437		−15.0%
U.S. Decennial Census; 1850–1870 1880-1890; 1900 1910 1920; 1930 1940 1950; 1960 1970 1980; 1990 2000 2010

Cedarville first appeared as a census designated place in the 2010 U.S. census.

=== 2020 census ===
As of the 2020 census, Cedarville had a population of 437. The median age was 56.1 years. 18.3% of residents were under the age of 18 and 34.6% of residents were 65 years of age or older. For every 100 females there were 83.6 males, and for every 100 females age 18 and over there were 77.6 males age 18 and over.

0.0% of residents lived in urban areas, while 100.0% lived in rural areas.

There were 214 households in Cedarville, of which 11.2% had children under the age of 18 living in them. Of all households, 42.1% were married-couple households, 24.8% were households with a male householder and no spouse or partner present, and 25.2% were households with a female householder and no spouse or partner present. About 42.0% of all households were made up of individuals and 25.3% had someone living alone who was 65 years of age or older.

There were 274 housing units, of which 21.9% were vacant. The homeowner vacancy rate was 8.1% and the rental vacancy rate was 0.0%.

Racial composition as of the 2020 census
Race	Number	Percent
White	335	76.7%
Black or African American	0	0.0%
American Indian and Alaska Native	18	4.1%
Asian	0	0.0%
Native Hawaiian and Other Pacific Islander	0	0.0%
Some other race	38	8.7%
Two or more races	46	10.5%
Hispanic or Latino (of any race)	76	17.4%

=== 2010 ===
The 2010 United States census reported that Cedarville had a population of 514. The population density was 94.4 inhabitants per square mile (36.4/km^{2}). The racial makeup of Cedarville was 422 (82.1%) White, 1 (0.2%) African American, 15 (2.9%) Native American, 0 (0.0%) Asian, 0 (0.0%) Pacific Islander, 59 (11.5%) from other races, and 17 (3.3%) from two or more races. Hispanic or Latino of any race were 86 persons (16.7%).

The Census reported that 490 people (95.3% of the population) lived in households, 2 (0.4%) lived in non-institutionalized group quarters, and 22 (4.3%) were institutionalized.

There were 237 households, out of which 55 (23.2%) had children under the age of 18 living in them, 98 (41.4%) were opposite-sex married couples living together, 21 (8.9%) had a female householder with no husband present, 13 (5.5%) had a male householder with no wife present. There were 19 (8.0%) unmarried opposite-sex partnerships, and 1 (0.4%) same-sex married couples or partnerships. 92 households (38.8%) were made up of individuals, and 51 (21.5%) had someone living alone who was 65 years of age or older. The average household size was 2.07. There were 132 families (55.7% of all households); the average family size was 2.71.

The population was spread out, with 94 people (18.3%) under the age of 18, 31 people (6.0%) aged 18 to 24, 104 people (20.2%) aged 25 to 44, 149 people (29.0%) aged 45 to 64, and 136 people (26.5%) who were 65 years of age or older. The median age was 49.5 years. For every 100 females, there were 89.0 males. For every 100 females age 18 and over, there were 94.4 males.

There were 294 housing units at an average density of 54.0 per square mile (20.8/km^{2}), of which 146 (61.6%) were owner-occupied, and 91 (38.4%) were occupied by renters. The homeowner vacancy rate was 1.3%; the rental vacancy rate was 12.5%. 296 people (57.6% of the population) lived in owner-occupied housing units and 194 people (37.7%) lived in rental housing units.

=== 2000 ===
At the United States 2000 Census, there were 849 people, 374 households, and 236 families residing with a population density of 3.2 per 1 square mile (2.6 km^{2}) within Zip Code 96104, not all of which is within Cedarville. There were 465 housing units at an average density of 1.6 per 1 square mile (2.6 km^{2}). The racial makeup of the city was 90.3% White, 0.1% African American, 3.8% Native American, 0.7% Asian, 0.0% Pacific Islander, 3.1% from other races, and 2.0% from two or more races. 8.5% of the population were Hispanic or Latino of any race.

There were 374 households, out of which 23.8% had children under the age of 18 living with them, 50.5% were married couples living together, 8.6% had a female householder with no husband present, and 36.9% were non-families. The average household size was 2.21.

The median age was 46.6, of which 50.1% were men and 49.9% were women. For both sexes, the age distribution was: less than 5 years, 4.8%; 5 to 9 years, 6.7%; 10 to 14 years, 5.7%; 15 to 19 years, 6.2%; 20 to 24 years, 3.1%; 25 to 34 years, 8.2%; 35 to 44 years, 12.5%; 45 to 54 years, 18.1%; 55 to 59 years, 6.8%; 60 to 64 years, 4.1%; 65 to 74 years, 11.7%; 75 to 84 years, 9.1%; and 85 years and over, 2.9%.

The average income for a household in the town was $34,265. Males had a median income of $37,136 versus $19,083 for females. The per capita income for the town was $20,412. 18.5% of the population and 14.1% of families were below the poverty line.

== Climate ==
Cedarville has a steppe climate (BSk) according to the Köppen climate classification system.

Climate data for Cedarville, California (1991–2020 normals, extremes 1894–present)
Month	Jan	Feb	Mar	Apr	May	Jun	Jul	Aug	Sep	Oct	Nov	Dec	Year
Record high °F (°C)	69 (21)	72 (22)	80 (27)	88 (31)	98 (37)	105 (41)	110 (43)	111 (44)	106 (41)	96 (36)	79 (26)	66 (19)	111 (44)
Mean daily maximum °F (°C)	43.5 (6.4)	47.5 (8.6)	53.6 (12.0)	59.6 (15.3)	68.9 (20.5)	79.4 (26.3)	90.5 (32.5)	89.3 (31.8)	81.2 (27.3)	67.3 (19.6)	51.5 (10.8)	42.0 (5.6)	64.5 (18.1)
Daily mean °F (°C)	32.7 (0.4)	35.7 (2.1)	40.9 (4.9)	46.1 (7.8)	54.8 (12.7)	63.6 (17.6)	73.0 (22.8)	70.9 (21.6)	62.7 (17.1)	50.8 (10.4)	39.0 (3.9)	31.4 (−0.3)	50.1 (10.1)
Mean daily minimum °F (°C)	21.9 (−5.6)	23.9 (−4.5)	28.2 (−2.1)	32.6 (0.3)	40.8 (4.9)	47.9 (8.8)	55.5 (13.1)	52.5 (11.4)	44.2 (6.8)	34.3 (1.3)	26.5 (−3.1)	20.9 (−6.2)	35.8 (2.1)
Record low °F (°C)	−23 (−31)	−17 (−27)	−2 (−19)	10 (−12)	19 (−7)	22 (−6)	31 (−1)	27 (−3)	21 (−6)	1 (−17)	−7 (−22)	−28 (−33)	−28 (−33)
Average precipitation inches (mm)	1.71 (43)	1.16 (29)	1.48 (38)	1.41 (36)	1.35 (34)	0.67 (17)	0.24 (6.1)	0.23 (5.8)	0.34 (8.6)	0.94 (24)	1.55 (39)	2.04 (52)	13.12 (333)
Average snowfall inches (cm)	6.1 (15)	3.3 (8.4)	2.3 (5.8)	0.8 (2.0)	0.0 (0.0)	0.0 (0.0)	0.0 (0.0)	0.0 (0.0)	0.0 (0.0)	0.3 (0.76)	2.8 (7.1)	6.6 (17)	22.2 (56)
Average precipitation days (≥ 0.01 in)	9.3	8.3	9.3	9.2	8.5	4.8	1.6	1.9	2.5	5.3	8.8	10.1	79.6
Average snowy days (≥ 0.1 in)	2.2	1.7	0.9	0.5	0.1	0.0	0.0	0.0	0.0	0.1	1.2	2.4	9.1
Source: NOAA

== Economy ==
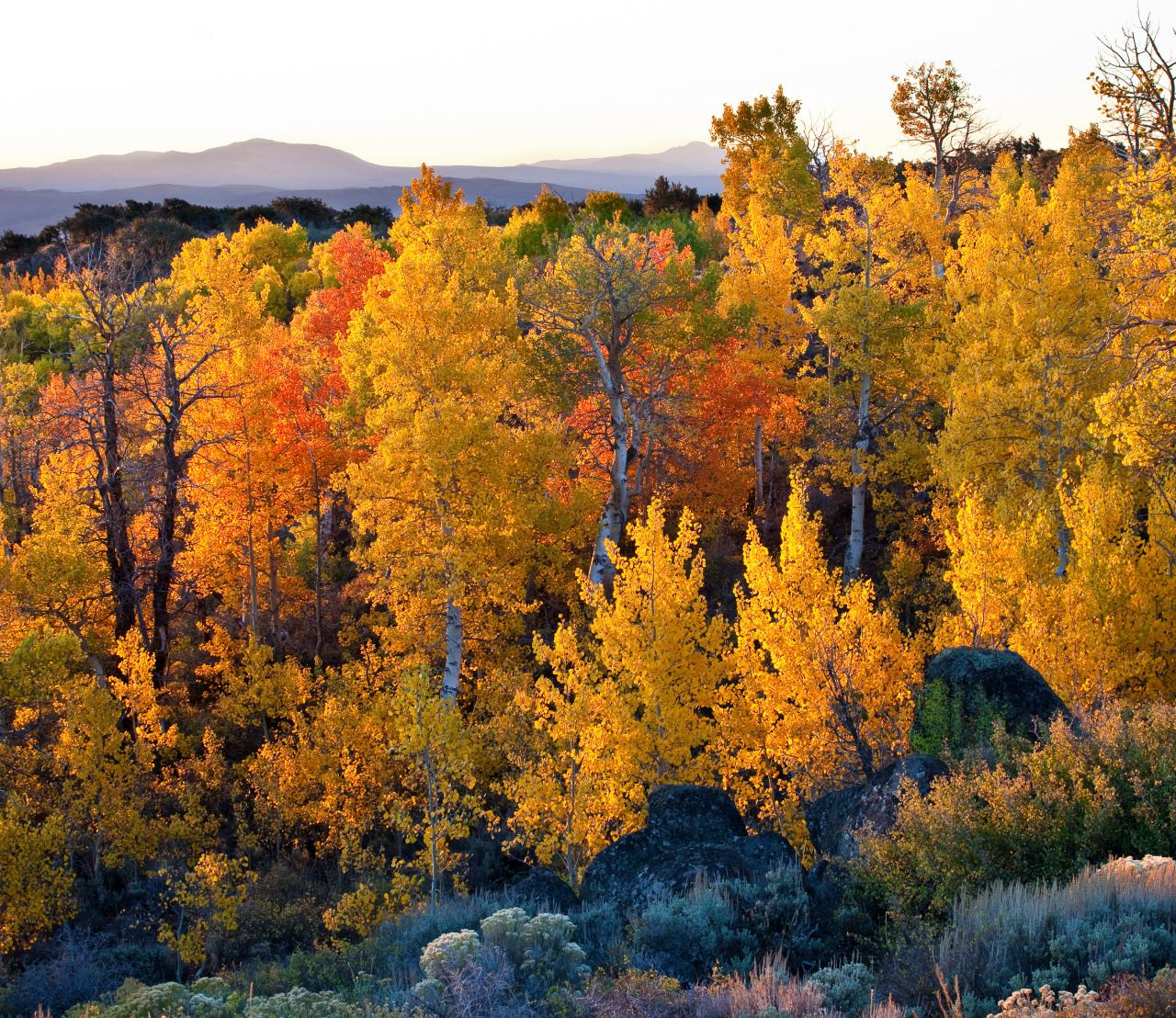
The Wall Canyon Wilderness Study Area, about 25 miles (40 km) SE in Nevada, features a fine fall color display in mid-October.

The town hosts an annual Last Frontier Fair in August. Tourist services, such as bed and breakfast accommodations, are available in the community. One area attraction is the Warner Mountains, most of which are inside Modoc National Forest, and the headquarters of the Warner Mountain Ranger District is in downtown Cedarville.

== Government ==
In the state legislature, Cedarville is in the 1st senatorial district, represented by Republican Megan Dahle, and the 1st Assembly district, represented by Republican Heather Hadwick.

Federally, Cedarville is in California's 1st congressional district, represented by Republican James Gallagher.

== Education ==
Public schools in Cedarville are administered the Surprise Valley Joint Unified School District and include Surprise Valley High School as well as Surprise Valley Elementary and Middle School.

== Infrastructure ==
The ZIP code for Cedarville is 96104. Wired telephone numbers in Cedarville follow the format (530) 279-2xxx or 279-6xxx. Wired telephone service is provided by Frontier Communications. Cedarville Hospital, operated by the Surprise Valley Hospital District, is located on Main Street at Washington. Cedarville Airport is located along Surprise Valley Road, 1.5 miles (2.4 km) north of California State Route 299.

== Notable people ==
- Steven Kistler, the scientist and engineer who invented aerogel, was born in the town in 1900.
- Clinton Romesha, Medal of Honor recipient, graduated Surprise Valley High School.

== See also ==
- California Historical Landmarks in Modoc County
