= Warner Mountains =

Mountain range in California and Oregon, United States

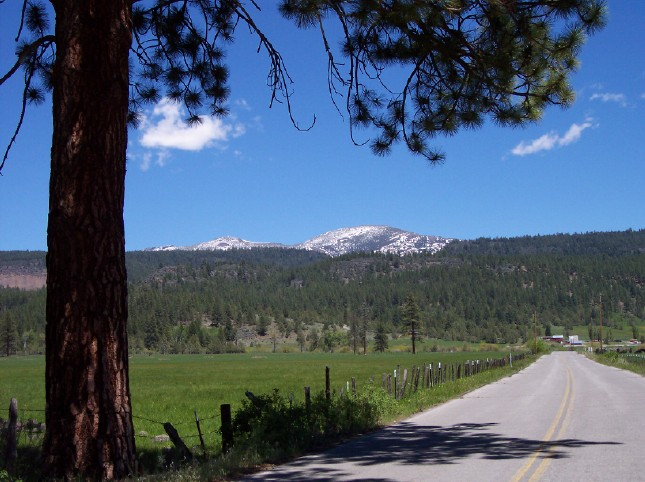
- The Jess Valley and the Warner Mountains in northeastern California

Highest point
- Peak: Eagle Peak
- Elevation: 9,892 ft (3,015 m)

Geography
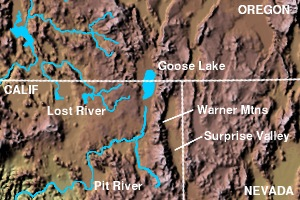
- Warner Mountains in California and Oregon
- Country: United States
- States: California; Oregon
- Districts: Modoc County; Lassen County; Lake County
- Range coordinates: 41°26′59.619″N 120°15′3.807″W
- Topo map: USGS Davis Creek

The Warner Mountains are an 85-mile-long (137 km) mountain range running north–south through northeastern California and extending into southern Oregon in the United States. The range lies within the northwestern corner of the Basin and Range Province, extending from the northeastern corner of Lassen County, California, through eastern Modoc County, California (east of Alturas), and northward into Lake County, Oregon (east of Lakeview).

The highest peak in the range is Eagle Peak with an elevation of 9,892 feet (3,015 m). The range is part of the Modoc National Forest in California and Fremont National Forest in Oregon. The southern portion of the range includes Eagle Peak and Warren Peak, within the South Warner Wilderness.

== Geography ==
The Warner Range is not part of the Sierra Nevada range or the Cascade Range, but part of the Great Basin Ranges. It is in the semi-arid, sparsely populated northeastern corner of California and the south-central portion of Oregon. The range is a classic example of horst and graben (fault-block) topography with pluvial (ephemeral) lakes occupying the graben basins.

The eastern escarpment of the range overlooks the Surprise Valley in California and Warner Valley in Oregon, enclosed basins that contain Upper Alkali Lake, Middle Alkali Lake, and Lower Alkali Lake along the California–Nevada border, and the Warner Lakes (Crump and Hart lakes) in Oregon. The western side of the range overlooks a ranching and farming region drained by the forks of the Pit River, a tributary of the Sacramento River. Goose Lake is a 28-mile (45 km) long closed-basin lake located in the Goose Lake Valley along the west side of the range, straddling the California–Oregon border. Goose Lake drained into the Pit River only twice in recorded history: in 1868 and 1881. The lake dried up in 1926 and from 1929 to 1934.

== Climate ==
Here is climate data gathered from Dismal Swamp near the California-Oregon border at around 7300 feet which shows typical climate patterns that are common for the region.

== History ==
The Fandango Pass in the Warner Mountains was on the Lassen-Applegate Trail used by emigrants from 1846 to 1850 as an alternate route to the Willamette Valley in Oregon and the gold fields of California. After reaching Goose Lake, the emigrant trains often split, with some continuing to the Willamette Valley and others continuing to the gold fields.

A gold-mining rush occurred in the Warner Mountains in 1912. A number of mines were developed briefly in what was known as the High Grade Mining District just adjacent to the Oregon border in Modoc County, California.

Great quantities of lumber were removed from the Warner Mountains beginning as early as 1920. Ponderosa pine logs were used to supply active sawmills and box factories at Lakeview, Oregon; Alturas, California; and Willow Ranch, California. The sawmill and box factory at Willow Ranch near the Oregon–California border was a company town with a population over 1,000 during the 1930s and 1940s. The operation closed in 1958.

== Namesake ==
The range was named after explorer Captain William H. Warner, of the U.S. Army Corps of Topographical Engineers, who was killed in the range by Native Americans on September 26, 1849, while exploring a route for potential railroad crossings of the Sierra Nevada. His remains were never found and his name appeared on maps of the range in 1866.

Camp Warner was established in the northern portion of the Warner Range in Oregon in 1867 by General George Crook to "pacify" the Indians. The post was abandoned in 1874. Crook Peak, elevation 7,834 feet (2,388 m) in the Warner Range near Camp Warner, is named after Crook.

== See also ==
- Crane Creek Lumber Company
- Infernal Caverns
- Oregon Outback
- Paiute
