= Alturas station (Nevada–California–Oregon Railway) =

- Nevada—California—Oregon Railway Depot
- U.S. National Register of Historic Places
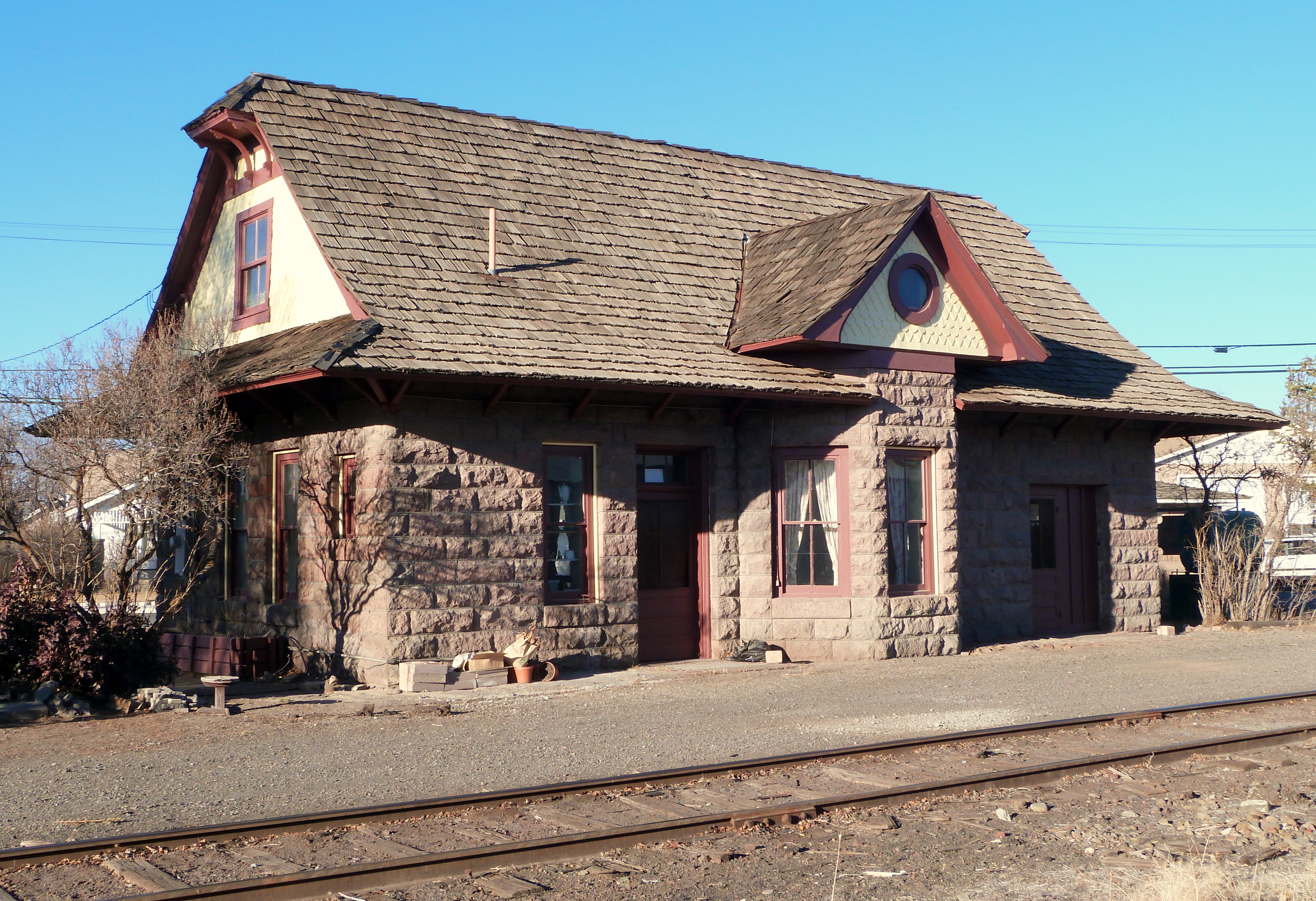
- Building in January 2014

- Location within California Location within the United States
- Location: 304 N East St; Alturas, California
- Coordinates: 41°29′12″N 120°32′23″W
- Built: 1908
- Architectural style: Queen Anne
- NRHP reference No.: 85000357
- Added to NRHP: February 28, 1985

The Nevada—California—Oregon Railway Co. Depot, commonly known as the N.C.O. Depot or The Whistle Stop, is a historic site in Alturas, California, listed on the National Register of Historic Places. It was built 1908 to serve as the passenger station for Alturas on the Nevada–California–Oregon Railway. It has been home to the Alturas Garden Club since at least 1962.

== History ==
In 1880, the Nevada and Oregon Railroad was founded; it was sold in 1884 and renamed the Nevada–California–Oregon Railway (N.C.O.). N.C.O. began regular rail service for Alturas on December 1, 1908. The N.C.O. depot was initially located at the intersection of Twelfth and Oak Streets, near the railyard, but was disassembled and moved, stone by stone, to its current location in 1915 to be closer to the central business district of Alturas.

In 1926, the Southern Pacific Transportation Company purchased the N.C.O., converting the line to standard gauge starting in 1927. Passenger service to Alturas was discontinued on January 1, 1938, and the depot was converted for use as railroad crew housing. The Alturas Garden Club acquired the depot in 1962.

== Design ==
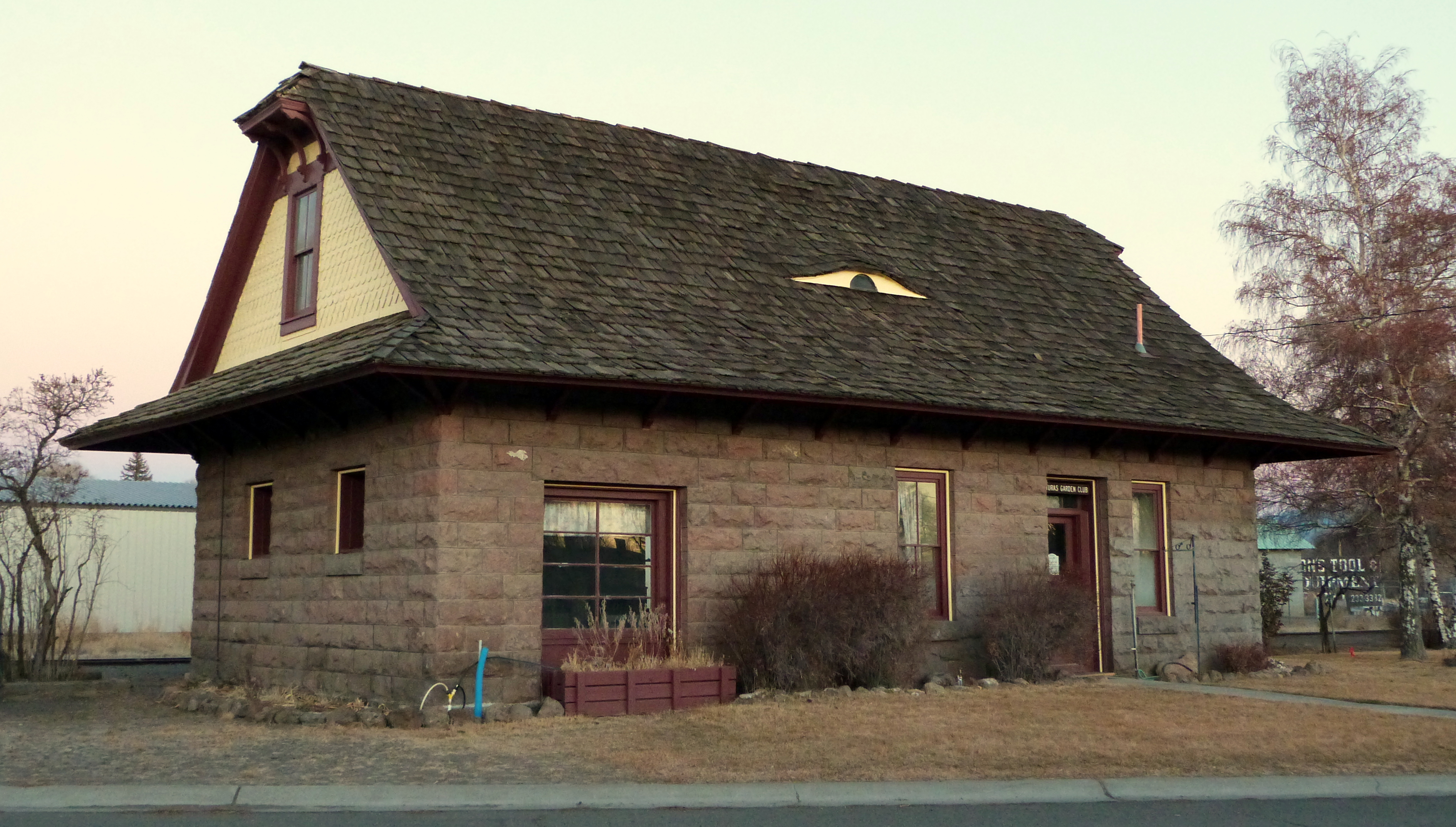
The depot seen from the street

The depot was constructed from stone blocks from a local quarry and is placed with its longest side parallel to the railroad tracks. The eastern facade, which overlooks the tracks, has a centrally located operator's bay, with the former baggage room to the north and the former waiting room to the south. It is largely unmodified from its days as a passenger depot, and is built in the late Queen Anne style, with an appearance more in common with contemporary stations in the eastern United States than other stations in California.

Preceding station	Nevada–California–Oregon Railway	Following station
Surprise toward Lakeview	Main Line	Likely toward Reno

== See also ==
- National Register of Historic Places listings in Modoc County, California
