= Nevada-California-Oregon Railway Co. General Office Building =

- U.S. National Register of Historic Places
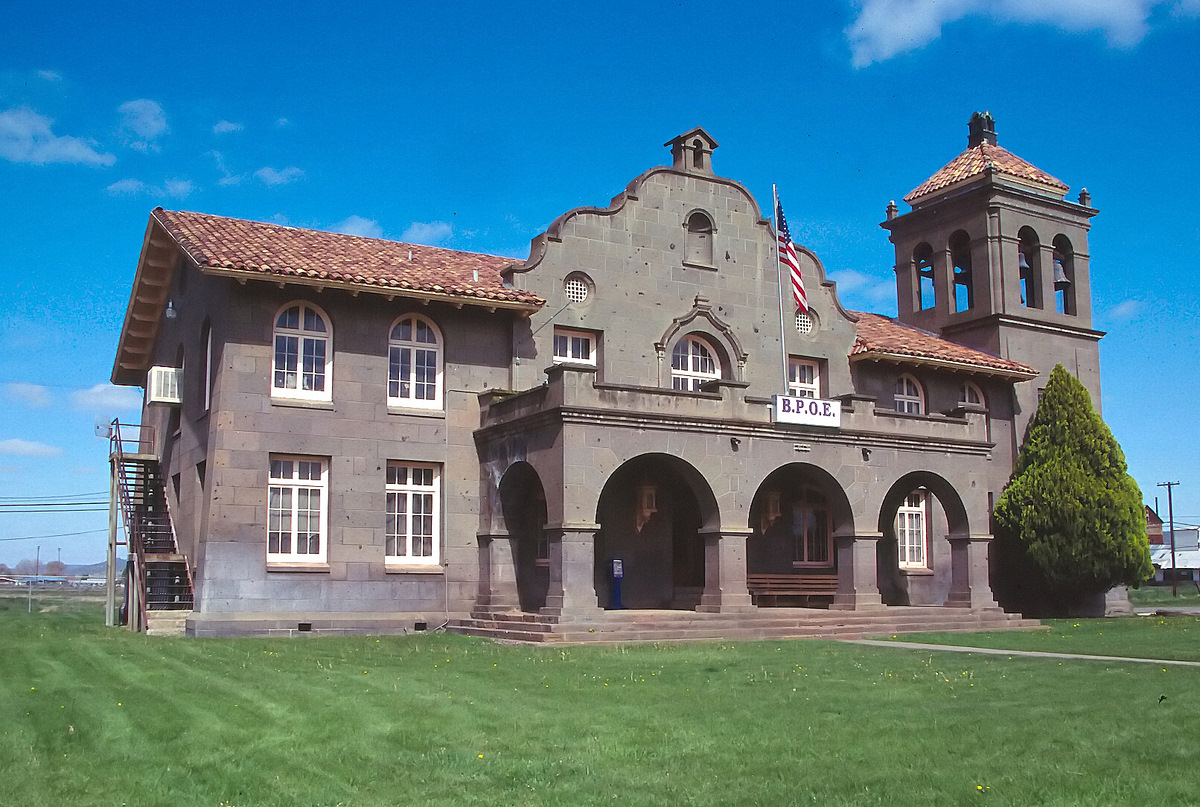
- Building in May 2003

- Location within California Location within the United States
- Location: 619 N. Main Street; Alturas, California
- Coordinates: 41°29′23″N 120°32′35″W
- Built: 1917–1918
- NRHP reference No.: 74000529
- Added to NRHP: September 6, 1974

The Nevada-California-Oregon Railway Co. General Office Building, commonly known as the N.C.O. Building, is a historic site in Alturas, California, listed on the National Register of Historic Places. It was built 1917–1918 to serve as the headquarters of the Nevada-California-Oregon Railway. It has been an Elks Lodge since at least 1974.

== History ==
In 1880, the Nevada and Oregon Railroad was founded; it was sold in 1884 and renamed the Nevada–California–Oregon Railway (N.C.O.). N.C.O. began regular rail service for Alturas began on December 1, 1908. In 1917, N.C.O. sold part of its line, extending from Reno, Nevada, to Hackstaff, California, to Western Pacific Railroad for $700,000. Since N.C.O. based its headquarters in Reno, the company needed a new location along its remaining lines. Alturas offered $10,000 and 20 acres (8.1 ha) of land to N.C.O. to move to the town; the offer was accepted.

On August 24, 1917, the Alturas Plaindealer ran a feature on the proposed headquarters with an architect's drawing. The project was estimated at $40,000, and stone would be sourced from a quarry in Sisson, California. Construction began sometime shortly after. On January 30, 1918, N.C.O. staff arrived in Alturas; because the new building was not yet completed, they worked in offices in the Fitzgerald House. It is not apparent when construction was completed, but it was probably later in 1918.

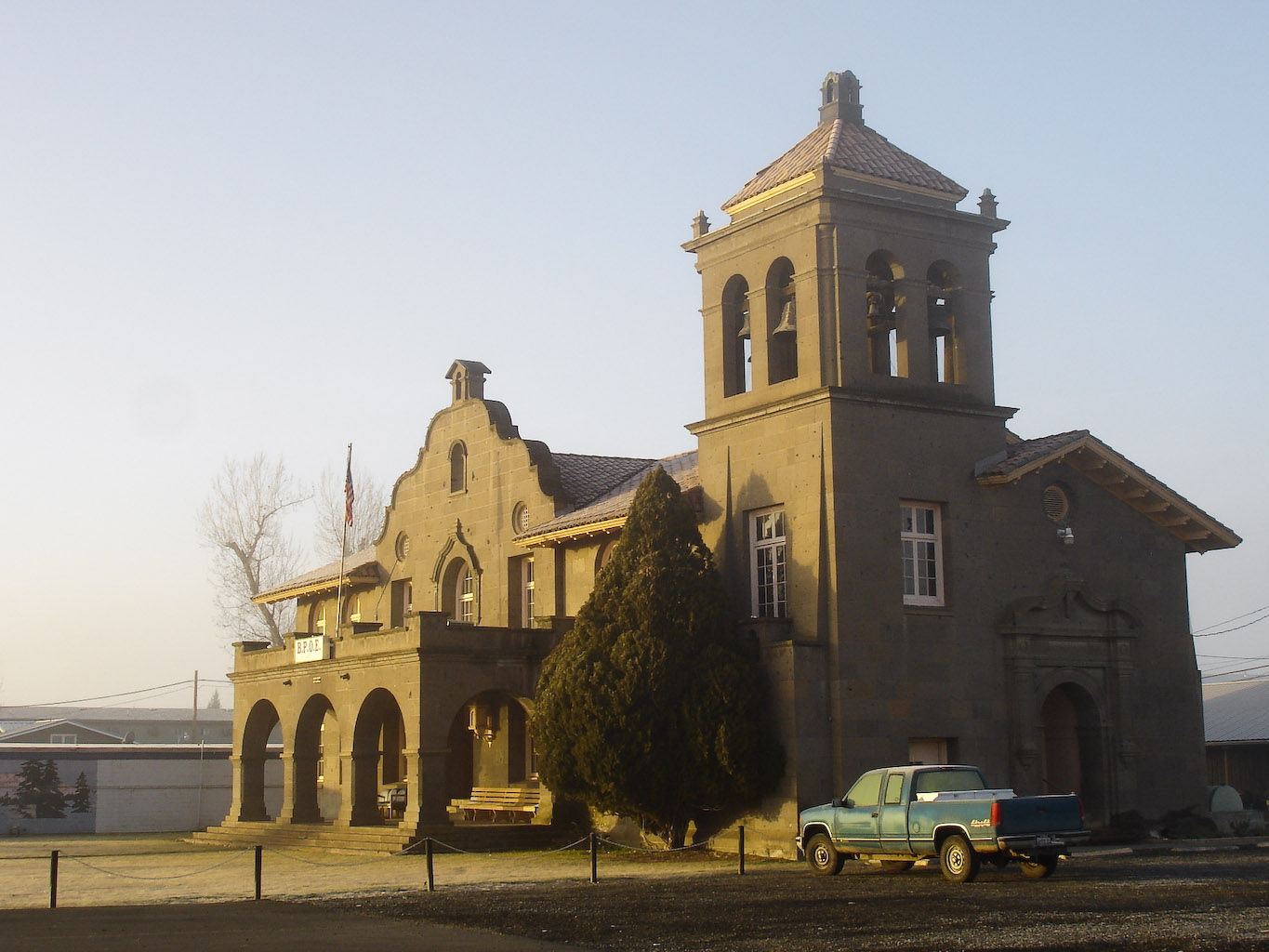
Building in November 2008

In 1967, the N.C.O. Building was included in a California survey of historic sites in the state. The building was added to the National Register of Historic Places on September 6, 1974. Since at least 1974, the building has served as an Elks Lodge. The main exterior modifications to the building have been the addition of a BPOE (Benevolent and Protective Order of Elks) sign over the porch and a bulletin board.

== Design ==
The design of the building is transitional between the older Mission Revival style and the newer Spanish Colonial Revival style. The building's Mission Revival elements are its arches and curved gable; Churrigueresque ornamentation at the side entrance shows Spanish Colonial Revival influence. The roof is tile and at the corner is a bell tower. At the time of construction, the belfry was in need of a set of bells; a single one is metal, but the rest are wooden dummies turned by the company. The building is fronted with a well maintained lawn along the east face.

Preceding station	Nevada–California–Oregon Railway	Following station
Surprise toward Lakeview	Main Line	Likely toward Reno

== See also ==
- National Register of Historic Places listings in Modoc County, California
