= National Register of Historic Places listings in Modoc County, California =

Location of Modoc County in California

This is a list of the National Register of Historic Places listings in Modoc County, California.

This is intended to be a complete list of the properties and districts on the National Register of Historic Places in Modoc County, California, United States. Latitude and longitude coordinates are provided for many National Register properties and districts; these locations may be seen together in a Google map.

There are 18 properties and districts listed on the National Register in the county, including 1 National Historic Landmark.

This National Park Service list is complete through NPS recent listings posted September 4, 2026.

== Current listings ==
	Name on the Register	Image	Date listed	Location	City or town	Description
1	Adin Supply Company	Adin Supply Company	February 7, 1997 (#97000028)	W side of Main St. between Center and McDowell Sts. 41°11′50″N 120°56′40″W	Adin	
2	Anklin Village Archeological Site		June 3, 1976 (#76000500)	Address Restricted	Canby	
3	Black Cow Spring		July 9, 1974 (#74000341)	Address Restricted	Canby	
4	Core Site		April 8, 1974 (#74000531)	Address Restricted	Canby	
5	Cuppy Cave		July 12, 1974 (#74000342)	Address Restricted	Canby	
6	Fern Cave Archeological Site	Fern Cave Archeological Site	May 29, 1975 (#75000224)	Address Restricted	Tulelake	
7	Jess Valley Schoolhouse	Jess Valley Schoolhouse	May 20, 1999 (#99000582)	Cty. Rd. 64; 41°15′59″N 120°18′39″W	Likely	
8	Lava Beds National Monument Archeological District	Lava Beds National Monument Archeological District	March 21, 1991 (#75002182)	Address Restricted	Tulelake	
9	Mildred Ann Archeological Site		June 3, 1976 (#76000501)	Address Restricted	Canby	
10	NCO Railway Depot	NCO Railway Depot	February 28, 1985 (#85000357)	East and 3rd Sts. 41°29′12″N 120°32′23″W	Alturas	
11	Nelson Springs		November 21, 2002 (#02001393)	Address Restricted	Likely	
12	Nevada-California-Oregon Railway Co. General Office Building	Nevada-California-Oregon Railway Co. General Office Building	September 6, 1974 (#74000529)	619 N. Main St. 41°29′23″N 120°32′35″W	Alturas	
13	Petroglyph Point Archeological Site	Petroglyph Point Archeological Site	May 29, 1975 (#75000178)	Address Restricted	Tulelake	
14	Sacred Heart Catholic Church	Sacred Heart Catholic Church	June 30, 1983 (#83001209)	507 E. 4th St. 41°29′14″N 120°32′13″W	Alturas	
15	Seven Mile Flat Site		December 24, 1974 (#74000340)	Address Restricted	Devil's Garden Ranger District	
16	Skull Ridge		July 9, 1974 (#74000287)	Address Restricted	Canby	
17	Skull Spring		July 9, 1974 (#74000288)	Address Restricted	Canby	
18	Tule Lake Segregation Center	Tule Lake Segregation Center	February 17, 2006 (#06000210)	NE side CA 139; 41°53′07″N 121°22′29″W	Newell	

== See also ==
- List of National Historic Landmarks in California
- National Register of Historic Places listings in California
- California Historical Landmarks in Modoc County, California
