= National Register of Historic Places listings in Lava Beds National Monument =

This is a list of the National Register of Historic Places listings in Lava Beds National Monument.

This is intended to be a complete list of the properties and districts on the National Register of Historic Places in Lava Beds National Monument, California, United States. The locations of National Register properties and districts for which the latitude and longitude coordinates are included below, may be seen in a Google map.

There are ten properties and districts listed on the National Register in the park.

This National Park Service list is complete through NPS recent listings posted June 20, 2025.

== Current listings ==
	Name on the Register	Image	Date listed	Location	City or town	Description
1	Captain Jack's Stronghold	Captain Jack's Stronghold	September 20, 1973 (#73000259)	S of Tulelake, Lava Beds National Monument; 41°49′18″N 121°30′18″W	Tulelake	
2	Hospital Rock Army Camp Site	Hospital Rock Army Camp Site	October 2, 1973 (#73000227)	S of Tulelake, Lava Beds National Monument; 41°49′45″N 121°28′31″W	Tulelake	
3	Lava Beds National Monument Archeological District	Lava Beds National Monument Archeological District	March 21, 1991 (#75002182)	Address Restricted	Tulelake	
4	Petroglyph Point Archeological Site	Petroglyph Point Archeological Site	May 29, 1975 (#75000178)	Address Restricted	Tulelake	
5	Schonchin Butte Fire Lookout	Schonchin Butte Fire Lookout	September 5, 2017 (#100001559)	41°44′17″N 121°31′45″W	Tulelake	
6	Thomas-Wright Battle Site		November 15, 1978 (#78000366)	S of Tulelake in Lava Beds National Monument; 41°46′13″N 121°31′25″W	Tulelake	

== See also ==
- National Register of Historic Places listings in Modoc County, California
- National Register of Historic Places listings in Siskiyou County, California
- National Register of Historic Places listings in California
