= Nevada-California-Oregon Railway Locomotive House and Machine Shop =

- U.S. National Register of Historic Places
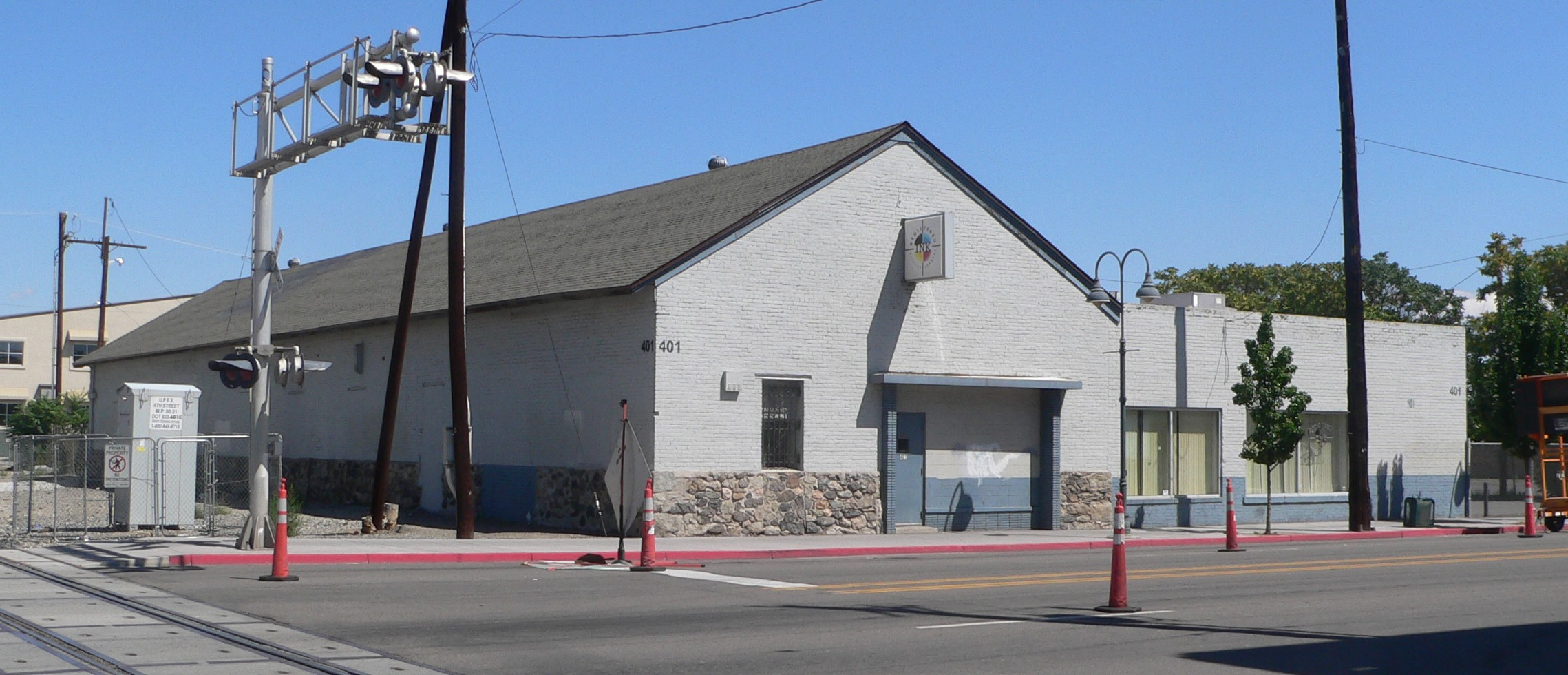
- View from the south-southwest, across 4th Street

- Location within Nevada
- Location: 401 E. 4th Street; Reno, Nevada
- Coordinates: 39°31′52″N 119°48′32″W
- Built: 1889
- NRHP reference No.: 83001120
- Added to NRHP: May 9, 1983

The Nevada-California-Oregon Railway Locomotive House and Machine Shop was built by the Nevada-California-Oregon Railway in 1889 in Reno, Nevada.

The railroad was organized in Reno in June 1880 as the Nevada and Oregon Railroad. It was decided that the best plan was to build north to the Columbia River to serve cattle ranches and farms in northeastern California and eastern Oregon. The company decided to lay narrow-gauge track because it was cheaper than standard gauge construction. It became one of the longest narrow-gauge railroads in the United States.

The building consists of the original locomotive house/machine shop and an addition. The locomotive house was built in 1889, and the addition was built in the 1940s. The building is one story, rectangular in shape and is built of brick.

The locomotive house was used to store the narrow-gauge steam locomotives. When the railroad built a new roundhouse in the mid-1910s, the locomotive house was converted into a machine shop.

In 1917, the railroad was sold to the Western Pacific Railroad (WP). Because the WP could not use the narrow-gauge terminal facilities such as the roundhouse and machine shop, it either sold them or leased them. The machine shop was leased to the Crane Plumbing Company for use as a warehouse and plumbing supply. The WP built the addition to the existing machine shop in the 1940s. In 1963, the Crane Company left and the WP leased the building to other tenants. In 1973, the WP sold the building. It has remained in private hands ever since.

The building was listed in the National Register of Historic Places due to its association with the Nevada-California-Oregon Railway and the railroad development in Nevada.
