= Sacred Heart Catholic Church (Alturas, California) =

Historic church in California, United States

- U.S. National Register of Historic Places
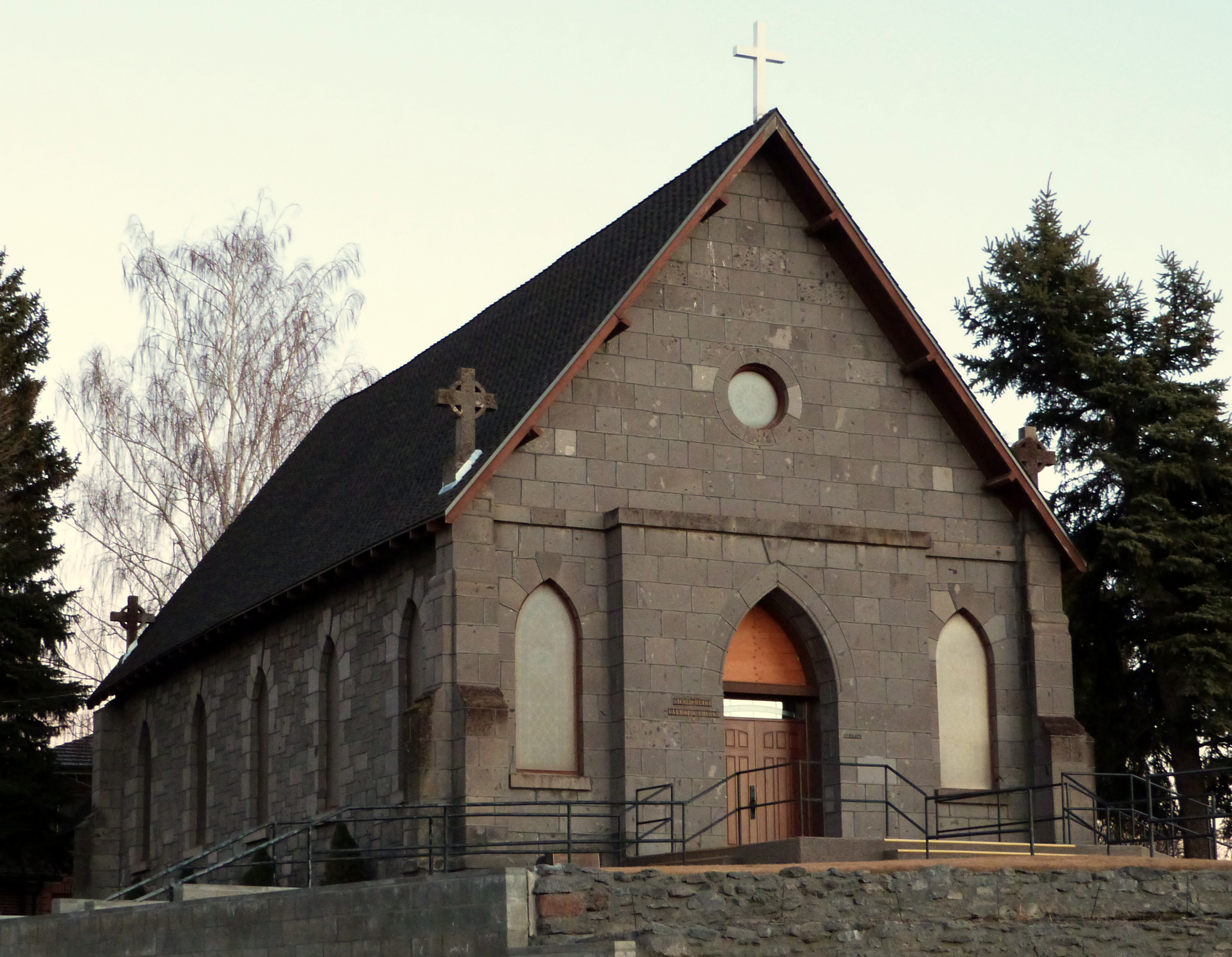
- Sacred Heart Catholic Church in 2014

- Location within California Location within the United States
- Location: 507 E. 4th Street; Alturas, California
- Coordinates: 41°29′14″N 120°32′13″W
- Area: 0.5 acres (0.20 ha)
- Built: 1883-1910, 1928
- Architectural style: Gothic Revival
- NRHP reference No.: 83001209
- Added to NRHP: June 30, 1983

The Sacred Heart Catholic Church in Alturas, California is a historic church at 507 E. 4th Street. It was listed on the National Register of Historic Places in 1983.

It was begun in 1883 but not completed until 1910. An addition was done in 1928.

A rectory was built in 1929.

== See also ==
- National Register of Historic Places listings in Modoc County, California
