= Rayl, California =

Extinct hamlet in California, U.S.

Coordinates: 40.1386°N 120.1214°W

Rayl (later Hackstaff) is a former town in Lassen County, California, United States. It was located 9 miles (14 km) north of Doyle, 4200 feet east-southeast of present-day Herlong. The town was named after Stanley Rayl, who built a hotel/store at the site in 1915.

The location was the junction between the Western Pacific Railway and the ill-fated narrow gauge Nevada-California-Oregon Railway (NCO). In addition to constructing the hotel, Rayl filed claims for 40 acres (16 ha) and persuaded the postal service to name the post office after himself rather than, as preferred by the railroad, Hackstaff (the family name of a relative of the company president). In 1917, Rayl tried to persuade the senators from California to establish a training base at the site, and while the proposal was supported by the surrounding states, it was not accepted. In 1918, he petitioned Lassen County to build a road about five miles in length through Rayl, but the road was never built. At about the same time, the NCO sold the right-of-way south of the junction to the Western Pacific, which took up the track and relaid it to standard gauge. In 1919, he proved up his claim on a homestead under the 1916 Stock-Raising Homestead Act.

By 1920, Rayl had closed his hotel. That train stop had been renamed Hackstaff and rail crews forced to eat there suffered food poisoning in July. Later that autumn, he leased his business to one Cyrus Helman, who also became assistant postmaster. This relationship led to strife in 1922, when Rayl found accounting discrepancies with the postal receipts; he also had sold the goods in the store to Helman, but had received only half of the payment due. A lawsuit ensued whose outcome is unclear: in the end, it was dismissed by the court in 1930 because a trial date had never been set. In the meantime, the post office was renamed to Hackstaff in 1922, but it closed the same year. This was also the year when the NCO ended service between Rayl and Wendel and the Western Pacific moved its crews to Doyle.

Rayl held on to the property until 1942, when it he sold it for $1,000 for the construction of the Sierra Army Depot.
