= Dorrisville =

Dorrisville may refer to:

- Dorrisville, California, former name of Alturas, California
- Dorrisville, Illinois, a neighborhood in Harrisburg, Illinois
