= Bloody Point Massacre, Modoc County =

Historical Landmark in Modoc County, United States

Bloody Point Massacre
- Location within California Location within the United States
- 41.95°N 121.35°W
- Location: Modoc County, California

California Historical Landmark
- Reference no.: 8

Bloody Point Massacre site is California Historical Landmark No. 8 in Modoc County, California on County Road 104 in Tulelake, California. The site is where the deadest massacres of emigrants on the Oregon Trail happened in 1850. On the trail 90 men, women, and children were killed by Modoc Tribe warriors. The historical spot is three miles South of Oregon California border. Later the conflict grew to the Modoc War (1872 to 1873), between the Modoc people and the United States Army in northeastern California and southeastern Oregon. After the attack only one person survived, the history of the attack is known by his escape and telling of the event. Hearing the news Colonel John E. Ross went to the site and found the remains of the dead, tortured and mutilated. There were other attacks along the trail there. In 1851 a Wagon train was saved the same fate, as Captain John F. Miller and some volunteers rode out to meet a Wagon train to escort them, at the same spot, Bloody Point, and they found the Wagon train about to be attacked. A Wagon train near Crooked Creek was attacked by the same warriors.

The Oregon Trail was a 2,170-mile (3,490 km) long trail used by Wagon trains traveling east to west, starting in 1836. The Oregon Trail was one of a few Westward Expansion Trails bring pioneers and gold seekers from the Missouri River, at Independence, Missouri to valleys in Oregon. Starting in 1843 the Oregon Trail was heavily used in what is called The Great Migration of 1843 and the Wagon Train of 1843. With more travelers at the start of the California Gold Rush starting in 1849. The first transcontinental railroad was completed in 1869, thus the decline in the use of the Oregon TrailOregon Trail.

== See also ==
- California Historical Landmarks in Modoc County
