= I'SOT =

Christian denomination in the United States

I'SOT, which stands for In Search of Truth, is a Christian group (a Pentecostal offshoot) founded in the late 1960s by E. Marie White (also known as E. Marie Tolbert) in Santa Cruz, California, United States. The group was named after a religious tract published by White in Gilroy, California.

The I'SOT community's main branch is in Canby, California, with a second branch in Coeur d'Alene, Idaho. Canby is known for the I'SOT's nativity scenes prominently displayed along the town's main street, California State Route 299. Several thousand one-time dedicated members have passed through the group and about 75 to 100 active members are living in the small rural town of Canby in Modoc County, California, in Coeur d'Alene, or in a few isolated places in the northwestern United States.

== Criticism ==
Allegations of physical and sexual abuse brought against members by clients of I'SOT's group home/foster home during the late 1980s prompted an investigation by California's Department of Social Services Community Care Licensing Division. The final report was filed on July 26, 1991. That investigation found a "preponderance of the evidence" that members of I'SOT had physically and sexually abused residents of the group home between 1978 and 1990. I'SOT's application for renewal of their license to operate the group home was denied, after which they appealed the decision and lost. The group home was sold to Environmental Alternatives; however, many I'SOT members still work there.
