= Canby, California =

Canby
- census-designated place
- Location of Canby in Modoc County, California.

- Location in California
- Coordinates: 41°26′38″N 120°52′13″W
- Country: United States
- State: California
- County: Modoc

Area
  - Total: 2.32 sq mi (6.01 km^{2})
  - Land: 2.29 sq mi (5.93 km^{2})
  - Water: 0.031 sq mi (0.08 km^{2}) 1.79%
- Elevation: 4,314 ft (1,315 m)

Population (2020)
  - Total: 183
  - Density: 79.9/sq mi (30.84/km^{2})
- Time zone: UTC-8 (Pacific (PST))
  - Summer (DST): UTC-7 (PDT)
- ZIP Code: 96015
- Area codes: 530, 837
- GNIS feature ID: 220535; 2582963

Canby is a census-designated place in Modoc County, California, United States. It is located 17 miles (27 km) west of Alturas, at an elevation of 4,314 feet (1,315 m). Its population is 183 as of the 2020 census, down from 315 from the 2010 census. The ZIP Code is 96015. The community is served by area code 530.

Canby is the location of the main branch of the I'SOT religious community, and is known for the I'SOT's nativity scenes prominently displayed along the town's main street, California State Route 299.

== History ==
The first post office opened at Canby in 1874. The town was named in honor of General Edward Canby, who was shot by the Modoc tribal leader Captain Jack at a peacemaking session as part of the Modoc War. This shooting lead to the siege at Captain Jack's Stronghold.

Until the late 1940s, Canby was the site of Big Lakes Box Company and the supply point for Big Lakes Logging Camp in the Adin Mountains about 10 miles (16 km) to the southeast, where conditions were primitive.

- California Historical Landmarks:

About 9.3 mi (15 km) northwest of Canby is a California Historical Landmark number #111 about the Old Emigrant Trail.

California Historical Landmark number 111 reads:

NO. 111 OLD EMIGRANT TRAIL - Near the present Pit River-Happy Camp Road this old pioneer trail, part of one of the earliest roads in northeastern California, is yet easily traced. Trees eight to ten inches in diameter are growing in the old road bed.

About 5 miles (8 km) southeast of Canby is California Historical Landmark number 125.

California Historical Landmark number 125 reads:

NO. 125 EVANS AND BAILEY FIGHT-1861 - S. D. Evans, Sr. and Joe Bailey, stockmen from Rogue River Valley, Oregon, and 16 of their employees were driving 900 head of beef cattle from Roseburg to the mines at Virginia City, Nevada when they were attacked by Indians and the two owners killed.

== Geography ==
According to the United States Census Bureau, the CDP covers an area of 2.3 square miles (6 km^{2}), of which 98.21% is land and 1.79% is water.

=== Climate ===
This region experiences hot and dry summers, with no average monthly temperatures above 71.6 °F. According to the Köppen Climate Classification system, Canby has a warm-summer Mediterranean climate, abbreviated "Csb" on climate maps.

Climate data for Canby
Month	Jan	Feb	Mar	Apr	May	Jun	Jul	Aug	Sep	Oct	Nov	Dec	Year
Record high °F (°C)	64 (18)	73 (23)	79 (26)	85 (29)	94 (34)	100 (38)	107 (42)	103 (39)	100 (38)	91 (33)	79 (26)	64 (18)	107 (42)
Mean daily maximum °F (°C)	43.3 (6.3)	46.7 (8.2)	54.0 (12.2)	60.4 (15.8)	69.5 (20.8)	78.9 (26.1)	87.2 (30.7)	86.8 (30.4)	79.5 (26.4)	68.2 (20.1)	50.9 (10.5)	42.8 (6.0)	64.0 (17.8)
Mean daily minimum °F (°C)	19.3 (−7.1)	21.7 (−5.7)	25.0 (−3.9)	29.4 (−1.4)	36.5 (2.5)	41.9 (5.5)	47.2 (8.4)	45.8 (7.7)	38.5 (3.6)	29.8 (−1.2)	23.9 (−4.5)	19.8 (−6.8)	31.6 (−0.2)
Record low °F (°C)	−23 (−31)	−33 (−36)	−6 (−21)	12 (−11)	19 (−7)	23 (−5)	29 (−2)	27 (−3)	17 (−8)	−3 (−19)	−20 (−29)	−26 (−32)	−33 (−36)
Average precipitation inches (mm)	1.67 (42)	1.62 (41)	1.68 (43)	1.27 (32)	1.40 (36)	0.93 (24)	0.22 (5.6)	0.36 (9.1)	0.58 (15)	1.17 (30)	2.00 (51)	2.11 (54)	15.01 (382.7)
Average snowfall inches (cm)	4.3 (11)	2.6 (6.6)	3.2 (8.1)	2.0 (5.1)	0.2 (0.51)	0.0 (0.0)	0.0 (0.0)	0.0 (0.0)	0.0 (0.0)	0.1 (0.25)	1.5 (3.8)	4.8 (12)	18.7 (47.36)
Source: NOAA

== Demographics ==
Historical population
Census	Pop.	Note	%±
2010	315		—
2020	183		−41.9%
U.S. Decennial Census; 1850–1870 1880-1890; 1900 1910 1920; 1930 1940 1950; 1960 1970 1980; 1990 2000 2010

=== 2020 census ===
As of the 2020 census, Canby had a population of 183. The population density was 79.9 inhabitants per square mile (30.8/km^{2}). 0.0% of residents lived in urban areas, while 100.0% lived in rural areas.

The census reported that 119 people (65.0% of the population) lived in households, 57 (31.1%) lived in non-institutionalized group quarters, and 7 (3.8%) were institutionalized.

There were 51 households, out of which 18 (35.3%) had children under the age of 18 living in them, 25 (49.0%) were married-couple households, 6 (11.8%) were cohabiting couple households, 15 (29.4%) had a female householder with no partner present, and 5 (9.8%) had a male householder with no partner present. 12 households (23.5%) were one person, and 7 (13.7%) were one person aged 65 or older. The average household size was 2.33. There were 34 families (66.7% of all households).

The age distribution was 25 people (13.7%) under the age of 18, 10 people (5.5%) aged 18 to 24, 41 people (22.4%) aged 25 to 44, 51 people (27.9%) aged 45 to 64, and 56 people (30.6%) who were 65 years of age or older. The median age was 55.5 years. There were 98 males and 85 females. For every 100 females there were 115.3 males, and for every 100 females age 18 and over there were 113.5 males age 18 and over.

There were 64 housing units at an average density of 27.9 units per square mile (10.8 units/km^{2}), of which 51 (79.7%) were occupied. Of these, 30 (58.8%) were owner-occupied, and 21 (41.2%) were occupied by renters. The homeowner vacancy rate was 0.0% and the rental vacancy rate was 0.0%.

Racial composition as of the 2020 census
Race	Number	Percent
White	144	78.7%
Black or African American	5	2.7%
American Indian and Alaska Native	2	1.1%
Asian	2	1.1%
Native Hawaiian and Other Pacific Islander	0	0.0%
Some other race	8	4.4%
Two or more races	22	12.0%
Hispanic or Latino (of any race)	12	6.6%

=== 2010 census ===
Canby first appeared as a census designated place in the 2010 U.S. census.

== Politics ==
In the state legislature, Canby is in the 1st senatorial district, represented by Republican Megan Dahle, and the 1st Assembly district, represented by Republican Heather Hadwick.

Federally, Canby is in California's 1st congressional district, represented by Republican James Gallagher.

== Education ==
Modoc Joint Unified School District is the local school district.

== See also ==
- California Historical Landmarks in Modoc County
