= California Historical Landmarks in Modoc County =

This list includes properties and districts listed on the California Historical Landmark listing in Modoc County, California. Click the "Map of all coordinates" link to the right to view a Google map of all properties and districts with latitude and longitude coordinates in the table below.

Image		Landmark name	Location	City or town	Summary
Battle of Land's Ranch	108	Battle of Land's Ranch	State Hwy. 139, 0.1 mi. S. of jct. with Old Alturas Hwy. (Co. Rd. 114); 41°50′32″N 121°18′30″W		
Bloody Point	8	Bloody Point	2.9 mi. S. of Oregon border on Old Alturas Hwy. (Co. Rd. 114), then 0.7 mi. W. on Co. Rd. 104 at J Canal crossing 41°57′25″N 121°21′17″W		
Bonner Grade	15	Bonner Grade	Cedar Pass, 6.2 mi. W. of Cedarville on State Hwy. 299; 41°33′38″N 120°16′06″W	Cedarville	
Chimney Rock	109	Chimney Rock	U.S. Hwy. 395; 41°35′46″N 120°25′26″W	Alturas	
Cressler and Bonner Trading Post	14	Cressler and Bonner Trading Post	Cedarville Park; 41°31′44″N 120°10′26″W	Cedarville	
Evans and Bailey Fight	125	Evans and Bailey Fight	Hilltop, 500 ft. S. of Centerville Rd., 4.9 mi. S.E. of Canby; 41°24′56″N 120°48′09″W	Canby	
Fandango Pass	546	Fandango Pass	3.8 mi. W. of Surprise Valley Rd. (Co. Rd. 1) on Fandango Pass Rd. (Co. Rd. 9); 41°48′08″N 120°12′25″W	Fort Bidwell	
Fort Bidwell	430	Fort Bidwell	Fort Bidwell Indian Community Center, W. end of Bridge St. 41°51′31″N 120°09′32″W	Fort Bidwell	
Fremont's Camp	6	Fremont's Camp	Old Alturas Hwy. (Co. Rd. 114), 0.7 mi. north of jct. with State Hwy. 139; 41°51′16″N 121°18′52″W	Copic	
Infernal Caverns Battleground	16	Infernal Caverns Battleground	Ferry Ranch; 41°16′20″N 120°34′34″W	Likely	
Old Emigrant Trail	111	Old Emigrant Trail	N.W. of Co. Rd. 84; 41°25′07″N 120°59′48″W	Canby	
Tule Lake War Relocation Center	850-2	Tule Lake War Relocation Center	State Hwy. 139 and Co. Rd. 176; 41°53′07″N 121°22′29″W	Newell	

== See also ==
- List of California Historical Landmarks
- National Register of Historic Places listings in Modoc County, California
