= Alturas Municipal Airport =

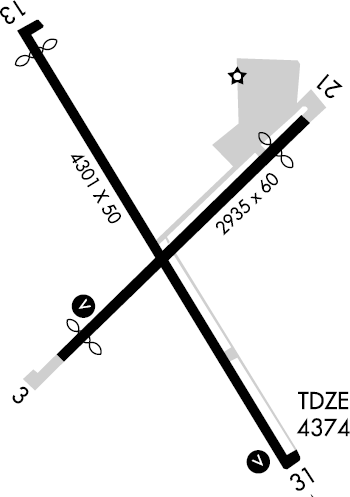
- FAA runway diagram
- IATA: none; ICAO: KAAT; FAA LID: AAT

Summary
- Airport type: Public
- Owner: City of Alturas
- Serves: Alturas, California
- Elevation AMSL: 4,378 ft (1,334 m)
- Coordinates: 41°28′59″N 120°33′55″W
- Interactive map of Alturas Municipal Airport

Runways
Direction	Length		Surface
Direction	ft	m	Surface
13/31	4,228	1,289	Asphalt
03/21	2,506	764	Asphalt

Statistics (2022)
- Aircraft operations: 19,750
- Source: Federal Aviation Administration

Alturas Municipal Airport (ICAO: KAAT, FAA LID: AAT formerly O00), is a city-owned public-use airport located one nautical mile (1.85 km) west of the central business district of Alturas, a city in Modoc County, California, United States. This airport is included in the FAA's National Plan of Integrated Airport Systems for 2009–2013, which categorizes it as a general aviation facility.

Although most U.S. airports use the same three-letter location identifier for the FAA and IATA, Alturas Municipal Airport is assigned AAT by the FAA but has no designation from the IATA (which assigned AAT to Altay Airport in Altay, Xinjiang, China).

== Facilities and aircraft ==
Alturas Municipal Airport covers an area of 160 acres (65 ha) at an elevation of 4,378 feet (1,334 m) above mean sea level. It has two asphalt paved runways: 13/31 is 4,228 by 50 feet (1,289 x 15 m) and 3/21 is 2,506 by 60 feet (764 x 18 m).

For the 12-month period ending December 31, 2022, the airport had 19,750 aircraft operations, an average of 54 per day: 96% general aviation and 4% air taxi.
