= Nevada–California–Oregon Railway =

Former railway line

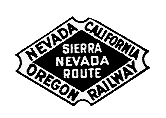

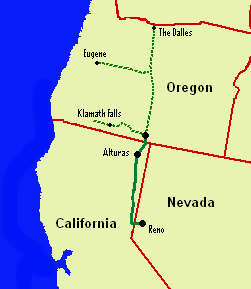
- Original plan for NCO rail network

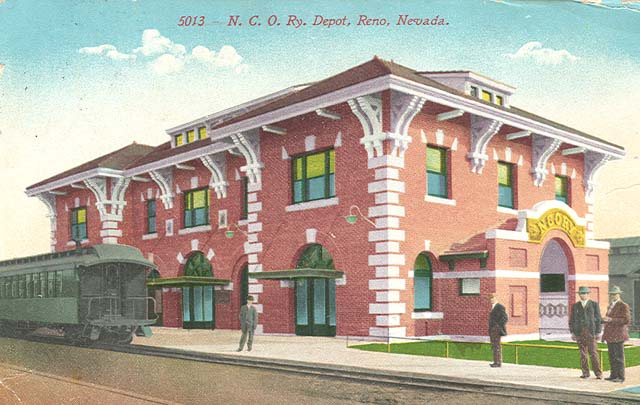
- NCO station in Reno, Nevada

Overview
- Headquarters: Reno, Nevada (1880–1918); Alturas, California (1918–1925)
- Reporting mark: NOCR
- Locale: California, Oregon, and Nevada
- Dates of operation: 1880–1925
- Successor: Southern Pacific Company

Technical
- Track gauge: 3 ft (914 mm)
- Length: 238 mi (383 km)

The Nevada–California–Oregon Railway (reporting mark NOCR) was a 3 ft (914 mm) narrow gauge railroad originally planned to connect Reno, Nevada, to the Columbia River. However, only 238 mi (383 km) of track were laid so service never extended beyond Lakeview, Oregon. Because of the company’s reputation for mismanagement, it was often called the "Narrow, Crooked & Ornery" railroad.

== History ==
The railroad was organized in Reno in June 1880 as the Nevada and Oregon Railroad. It was decided that the best plan was to build north to the Columbia River to service cattle ranches and farms in northeastern California and eastern Oregon. The northern terminus was to be The Dalles, Oregon, since that city was located on the Columbia River and had no eastern or southern rail connections at that time.

The company decided to lay 3 ft (914 mm) gauge track because it was cheaper than 4 ft 8 1/2 in (1,435 mm) standard gauge construction. Site survey and grading work for the railroad began in December 1880. The first spike was driven in Reno on May 28, 1881. However, the company was short of money so construction was slow. In addition, the board of directors was plagued by corruption and intrigue. One board meeting actually ended with a gun fight between two members, which killed the corporate secretary and wounded the man who became president. For a period of time, there were two separate boards of directors trying to run the company.

The railroad reached Oneida, California, 30 mi (48 km) north of Reno, on October 2, 1882. Regular service between the two cities began a month later. However, track construction remained slow, and the company’s business problems continued to grow. The Moran Brothers bank in New York was the company’s largest investor. In April 1884, the bank took full control of the railroad, purchasing the company at a court ordered auction for just over $372,000. The company spent the next few years improving existing lines and trying to build up local business.

On January 1, 1893, the name of the railroad was changed to the Nevada–California–Oregon.

The next northward extension commenced in 1899. In April 1902, the line reached Madeline, California. The tracks were extended to Likely, California, in October 1907; Alturas, California, in December 1908; and finally, Lakeview, Oregon, on January 10, 1912. The company planned to continue north through Prineville, Oregon, to The Dalles, with separate branches running west to Klamath Falls and on to the Rogue River Valley, and over the Cascade Mountains to Eugene, Oregon, in the Willamette Valley. However, no further construction ever took place.

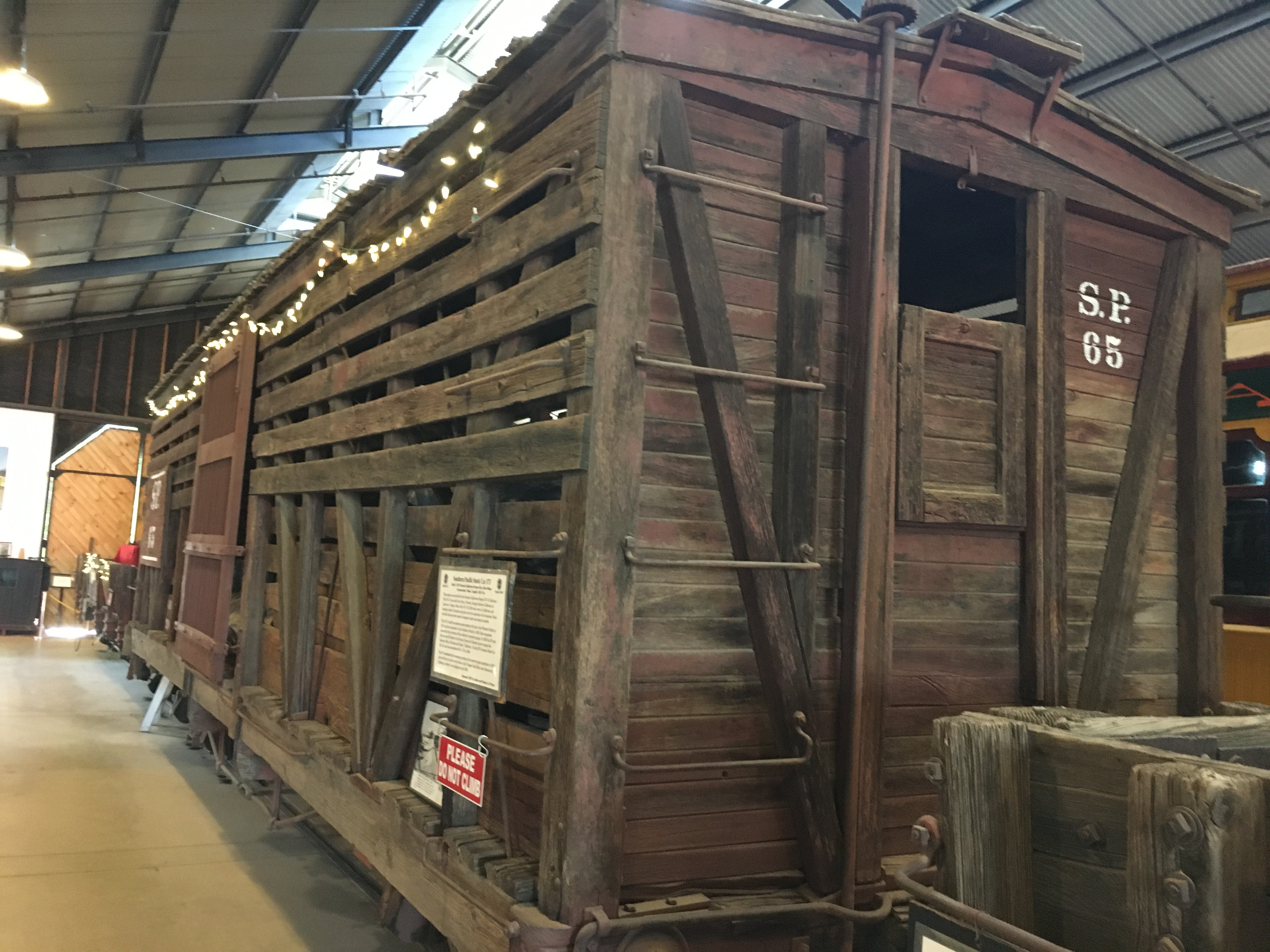
Nevada-California-Oregon Railway #159 (later, Southern Pacific #65), narrow-gauge stock car, at the Southern California Railway Museum. This car was built in the N-C-O shops in Reno, Nevada in 1912. Sold in 1926 to the Southern Pacific, the SP used it on its former Carson & Colorado Railroad line between Mina, Nevada and Keeler, California, until 1960, when it was retired.

Locomotives were converted from wood fuel to oil-burners by 1910. Financially, the railroad's best year was 1913, but decline followed quickly as traffic shifted to the recently completed standard-gauge Western Pacific Railroad and Southern Pacific branch to Susanville. The railroad's last rolling stock purchase was in 1915 when two locomotives, three passenger cars, two mail cars, and 78 freight cars from the dismantled Florence and Cripple Creek Railroad were obtained for the bargain price of $22,750. In 1917, the company began selling branch lines in California. The next year, the Reno station was closed, and the company headquarters and maintenance shop were relocated to Alturas. By 1922, the railroad was in serious financial trouble, and the Moran Bank wanted out of the business. On April 30, 1925, the Southern Pacific Company purchased the company. The line between Reno Junction and Reno was purchased by the Western Pacific Railroad while the segment between Reno Junction and Wendel was torn up.

Southern Pacific used the remaining line, as well as the Fernley and Lassen Railway and a new railway from Klamath Falls, to assemble its new Modoc Branch. This was intended to shut out any potential competition from the Great Northern Railway Oregon Trunk Line. By 1928, Southern Pacific had converted all the remaining Nevada–California–Oregon track to 4 ft 8 1/2 in (1,435 mm) standard gauge and sold its 3 ft (914 mm) gauge equipment. Several locomotives subsequently ran on the former Carson and Colorado Railroad. One was sold to the Pacific Coast Railway, and later passed to the Oahu Railway and Land Company during World War II.

On October 20, 1985, Southern Pacific abandoned the 54.45-mile (87.63 km) section between Lakeview, Oregon and Alturas, California, which is now operated by Lake County Oregon as the Lake County Railroad, running about 20 cars per week in two trips per week. At Alturas it joins with Union Pacific.

The line from south of Alturas to Wendel, California has been converted into the Modoc Line Rail Trail.

== Stations ==
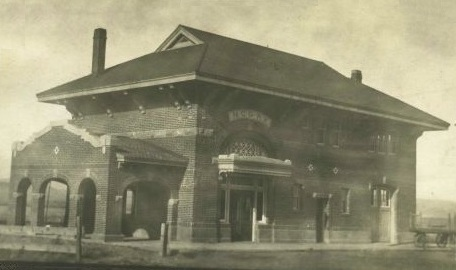
Lakeview station photographed in 1915

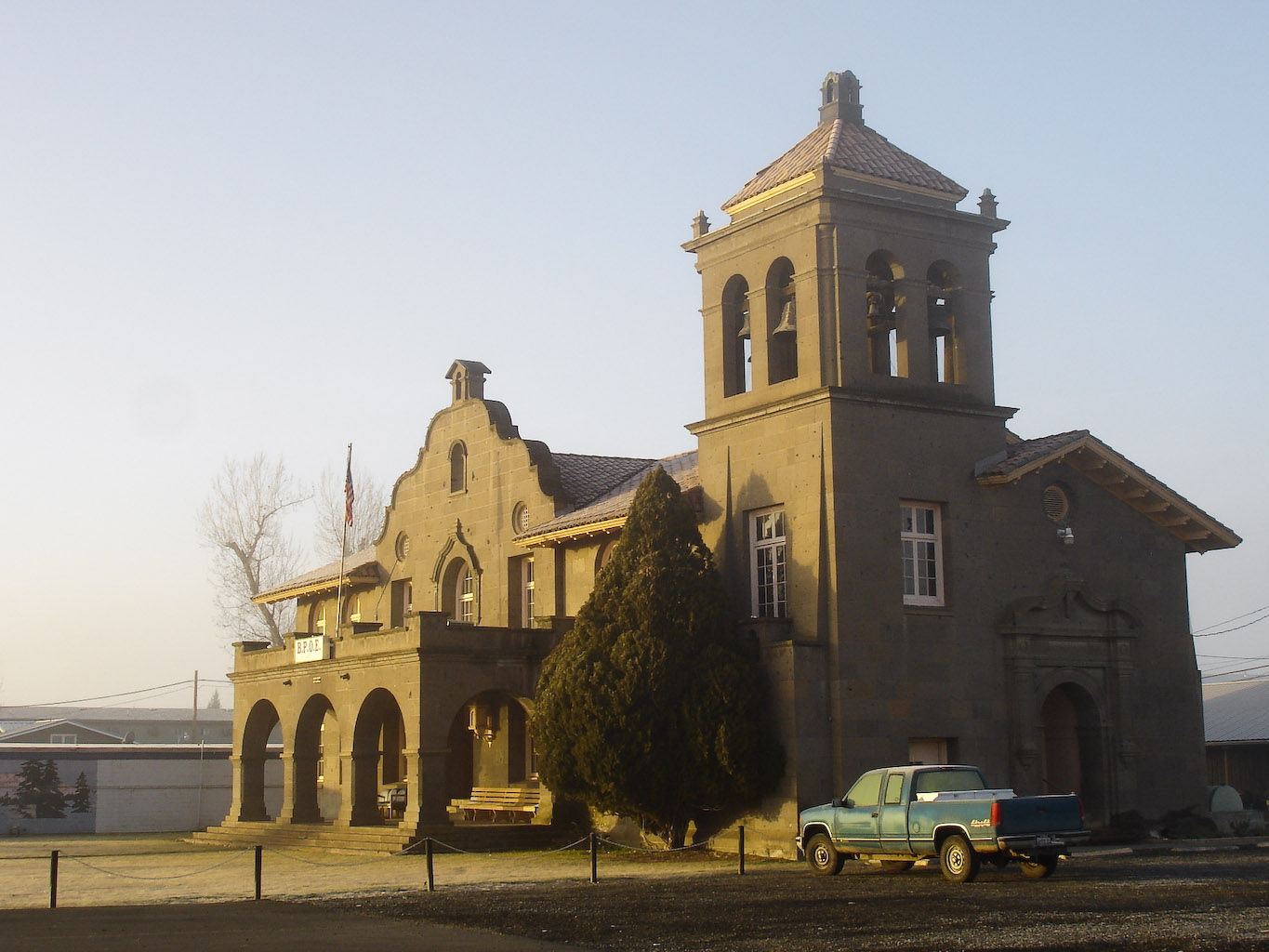
General Office Building

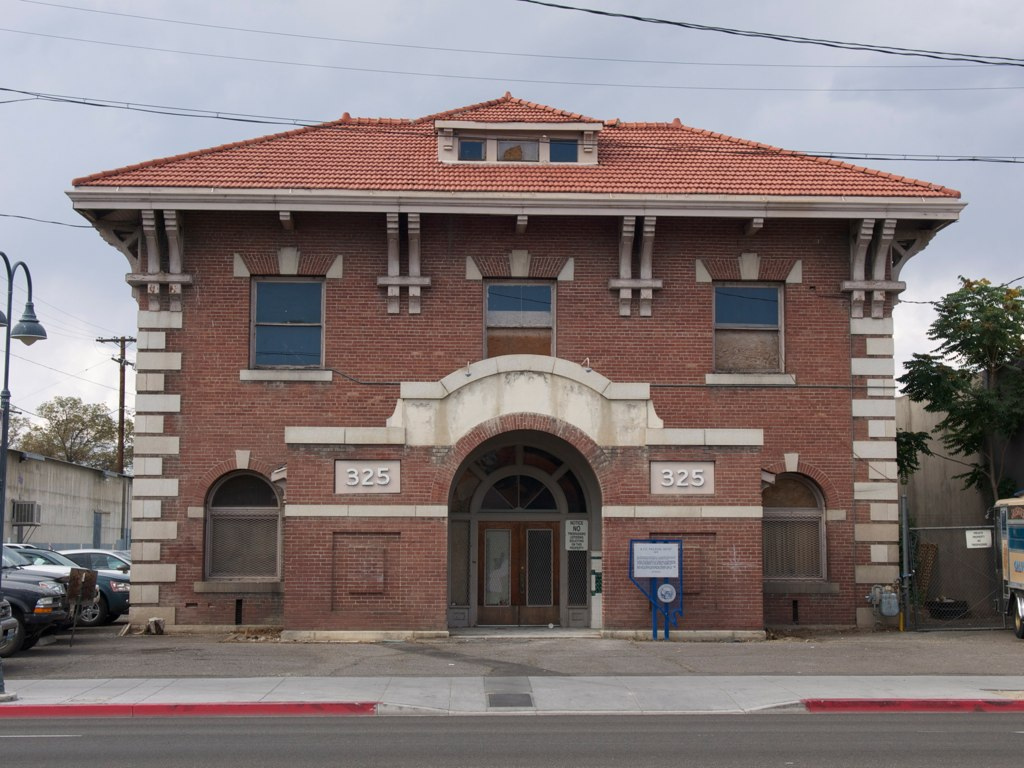
Reno Depot

The Nevada–California–Oregon Railroad built classic brick depots in Reno and Lakeview. A smaller stone masonry station was constructed in Alturas. All three passenger depots still exist, and are listed on the United States National Register of Historic Places along with the locomotive house and machine shop in Reno. The N-C-O railway office in Alturas and the depot at Lakeview are examples of the 1880s style of architecture known as Mission Revival. The features include solid massive walls with buttressing, broad unadorned wall surfaces, wide projecting eaves, low-pitched tile roofs, corridors with Roman aqueduct-like arches, terraced bell towers and mission belfry facades. (See The Journal of the Modoc County Historical Society, No. 11, 1989.) The style showed up at Stanford University, the Southern Pacific depot in Santa Barbara and the Mission Inn in Riverside. The architect for many N-C-O buildings was Carl Werner of San Francisco. However, he did not design the railroad's three main depots.

- Reno depot: The architect for the Reno depot was Frederick DeLongchamps.
- Alturas depot: The Alturas depot was built by Martin and Diamond, no architect is listed on the NRHP.
- Lakeview depot: The Lakeview depot was designed by Frederick DeLongchamps.

== Locomotives ==
Number	Builder	Type	Date	Works number	Notes
Santa Cruz	H.K. Porter, Inc.	0-6-0	1875		Built for the Santa Cruz and Felton Railroad; purchased in 1881 for use during construction; sold to Lake Valley Railroad in 1884
1	Baldwin Locomotive Works	4-4-0	December 1884	7527	purchased new; retired 1915
2	Baldwin Locomotive Works	4-4-0	December 1884	7528	purchased new; retired 1918
3	Baldwin Locomotive Works	4-4-0	August 1887	8791	purchased new as Erasmus Gest; moved to SP's Carson and Colorado Railway (C&C) in 1928. Not used by SP. Tender to SP #14.
1st #4	Baldwin Locomotive Works	2-8-0	September 1888	9518	purchased new as Charles Moran; sold to Tonopah Railroad in 1904
2nd #4	Baldwin Locomotive Works	4-6-0	October 1899	17124	purchased new as #6 Camya; renumbered in 1904; moved to C&C in 1928; not used by SP; tender to SP #14.
5	Baldwin Locomotive Works	4-6-0	November 1899	17123	purchased new as Amedee; rebuilt 1925; moved to C&C in 1928
2nd #6	Baldwin Locomotive Works	4-6-0	April 1903	22020	purchased new as #8; renumbered in 1904; moved to C&C in 1928
7	Baldwin Locomotive Works	4-6-0	April 1903	22012	purchased new; moved to C&C in 1928. Not used by SP. Tender to SP #17.
8	Baldwin Locomotive Works	4-6-0	August 1907	31445	purchased new; moved to C&C in 1928
9	Baldwin Locomotive Works	4-6-0	November 1909	34036	purchased new; moved to C&C in 1928
10	Baldwin Locomotive Works	4-6-0	1910	34528	purchased new; became Pacific Coast Railway #110 in 1929
11	Baldwin Locomotive Works	4-6-0	December 1911	37398	purchased new; became Pacific Coast Railway #111 in 1929
12	Baldwin Locomotive Works	4-6-0	December 1911	37394	purchased new; moved to C&C in 1928; renumbered SP #18
14	Baldwin Locomotive Works	2-8-0	April 1914	41300	purchased new; moved to C&C in 1928; renumbered SP #1; to Nevada County Narrow Gauge #9 in 1933.
22	Schenectady Locomotive Works	4-6-0	November 1899	5399	built as Florence and Cripple Creek Railroad #22; purchased 1915; moved to C&C in 1929
23	Schenectady Locomotive Works	4-6-0	January 1900	5420	built as Florence and Cripple Creek Railroad #23; purchased 1915; retired 1921
