= Adin Supply Company =

Historic building in Adin, California, US

- U.S. National Register of Historic Places
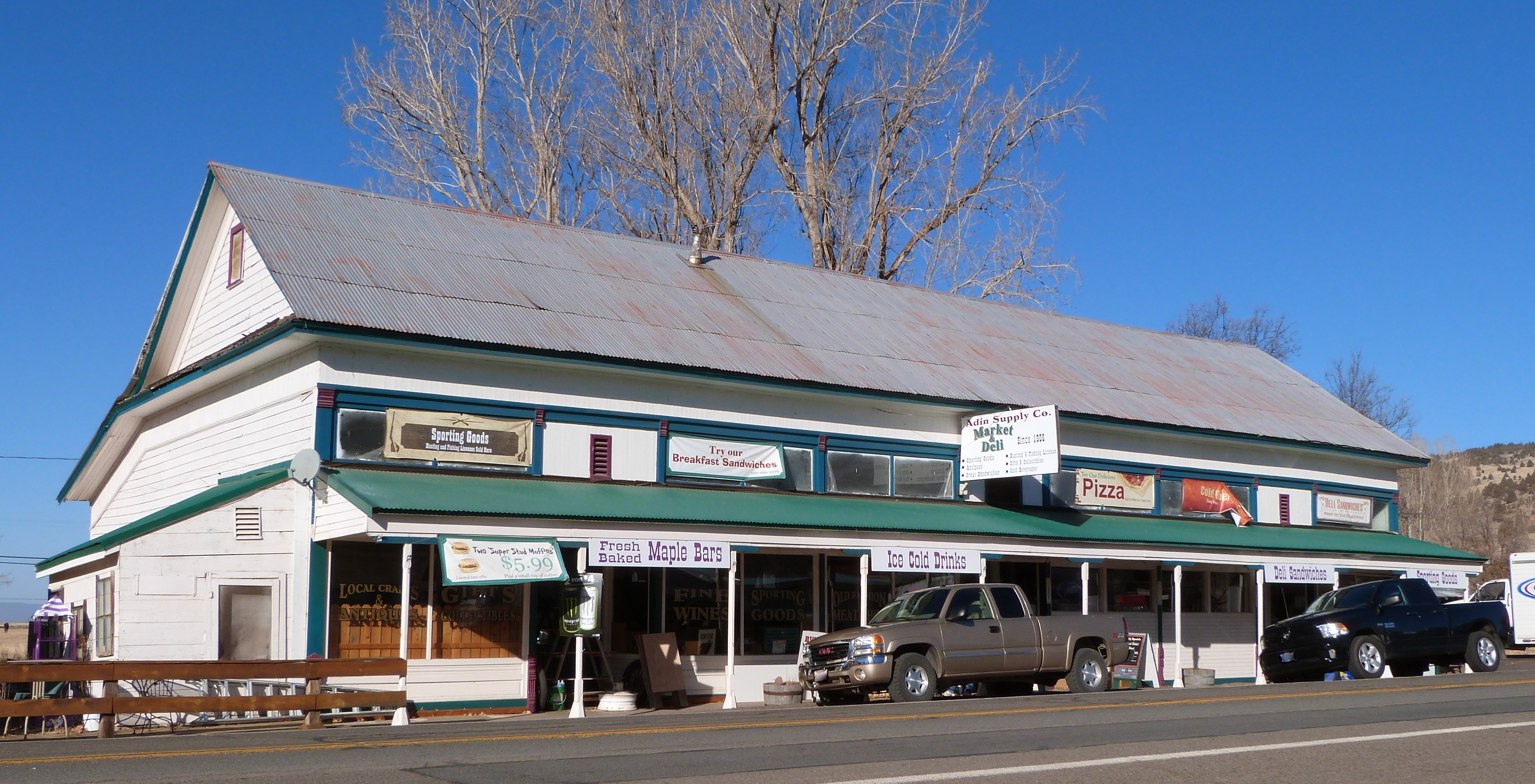

- Location within California
- Location: W side of Main St. between Center and McDowell Sts., Adin, California
- Coordinates: 41°11′50″N 120°56′40″W
- Area: less than one acre
- Built: 1906
- NRHP reference No.: 97000028
- Added to NRHP: February 7, 1997

The Adin Supply Company, located on the west side of Main St. between Center and McDowell Sts. in Adin, California, was probably built in 1906. The listing included two contributing buildings.

It has also been known as Big Valley Co-op Store.

The building is a one-story woodframe building about 50 by 80 feet (15 m × 24 m) in plan. It has siding of horizontal boards. Its roof, covered originally by shingles, is corrugated metal.

In 1996, it was the largest and oldest retail facility in Adin.
