= Petroglyph Point Archeological Site =

Large panels of Native American rock art near Tulelake, California, USA

- IUCN category III (natural monument or feature)
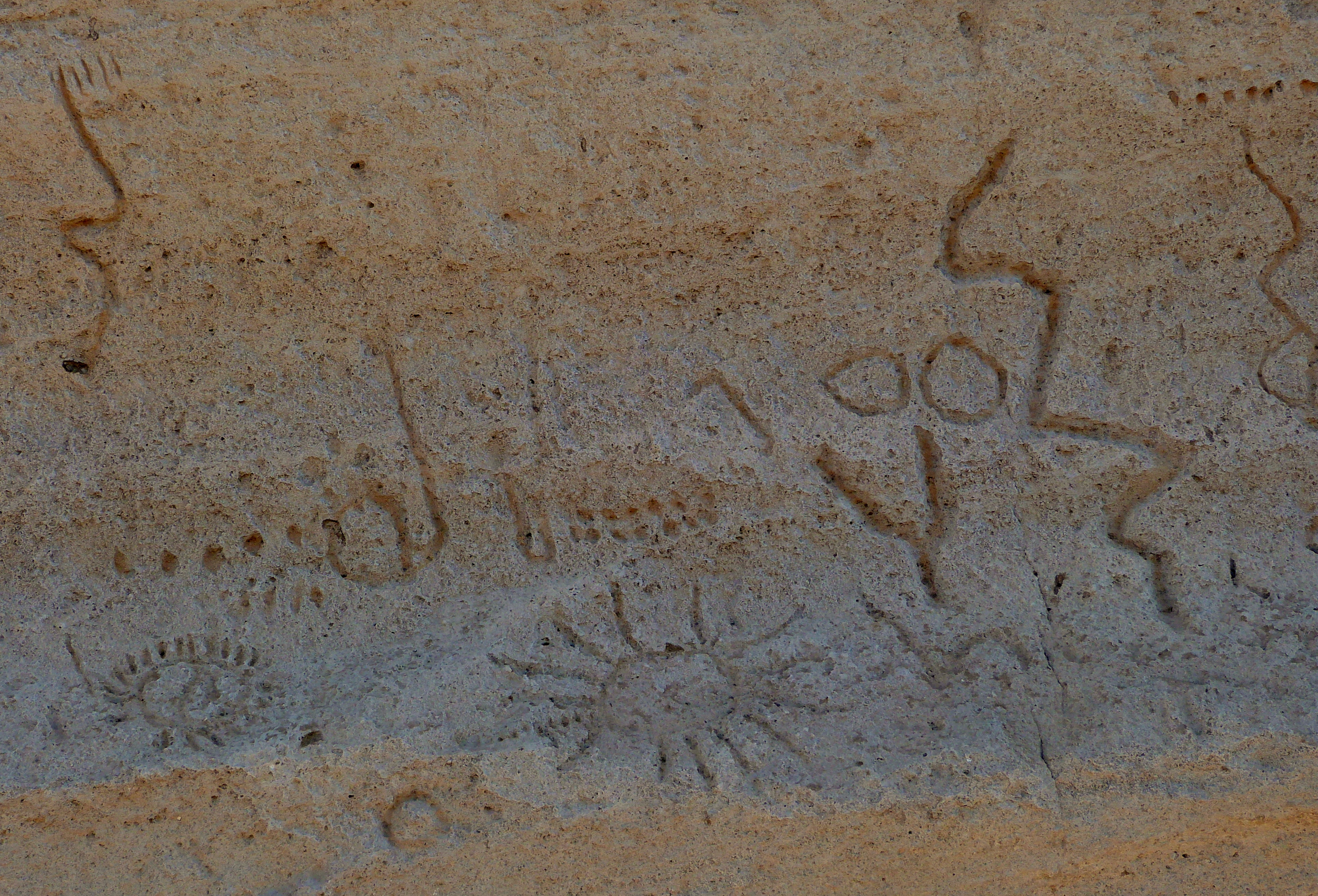

- Location within the United States
- Location: Siskiyou County, California, USA
- Nearest city: Tule Lake
- Coordinates: 41°50′42″N 121°23′28″W
- Area: 1,600
- Established: May 29, 1975
- Governing body: National Park Service

U.S. National Register of Historic Places
- Designated: 1975
- Reference no.: 75000178

The Petroglyph Point is an archaeological site within the Lava Beds National Monument, located southeast of Tulelake, California. Petroglyph Point contains one of the largest panels of Native American rock art in the United States. The petroglyphs are carved along the face of a former island within Tule Lake, in a region historically inhabited by the Modoc peoples. The Petroglyph Point Archeological Site was listed on the National Register of Historic Places in 1975, while the Lava Beds National Monument Archeological District was listed in March 1991.

It is difficult to approximate the age of the carvings due to Tule Lake's frequently changing water levels affecting natural weathering, but some estimates suggest the carvings were made over 6000 years ago.

The carvings differ greatly from those in similar archeological sites in that they feature shapes and patterns rather than living creatures. Due to the Modoc War from 1872 to 1873, as well as the subsequent relocation of the Modoc peoples, researchers are unable to collect any firsthand accounts regarding what the patterns might symbolize.

After the Modoc War, the subsection of the Lava Beds National Monument containing Petroglyph Point was owned and overseen by various farmers until it was given to the National Park Service in 1954.

== See also ==
- National Register of Historic Places listings in Modoc County, California
