= Jess Valley Schoolhouse =

- U.S. National Register of Historic Places
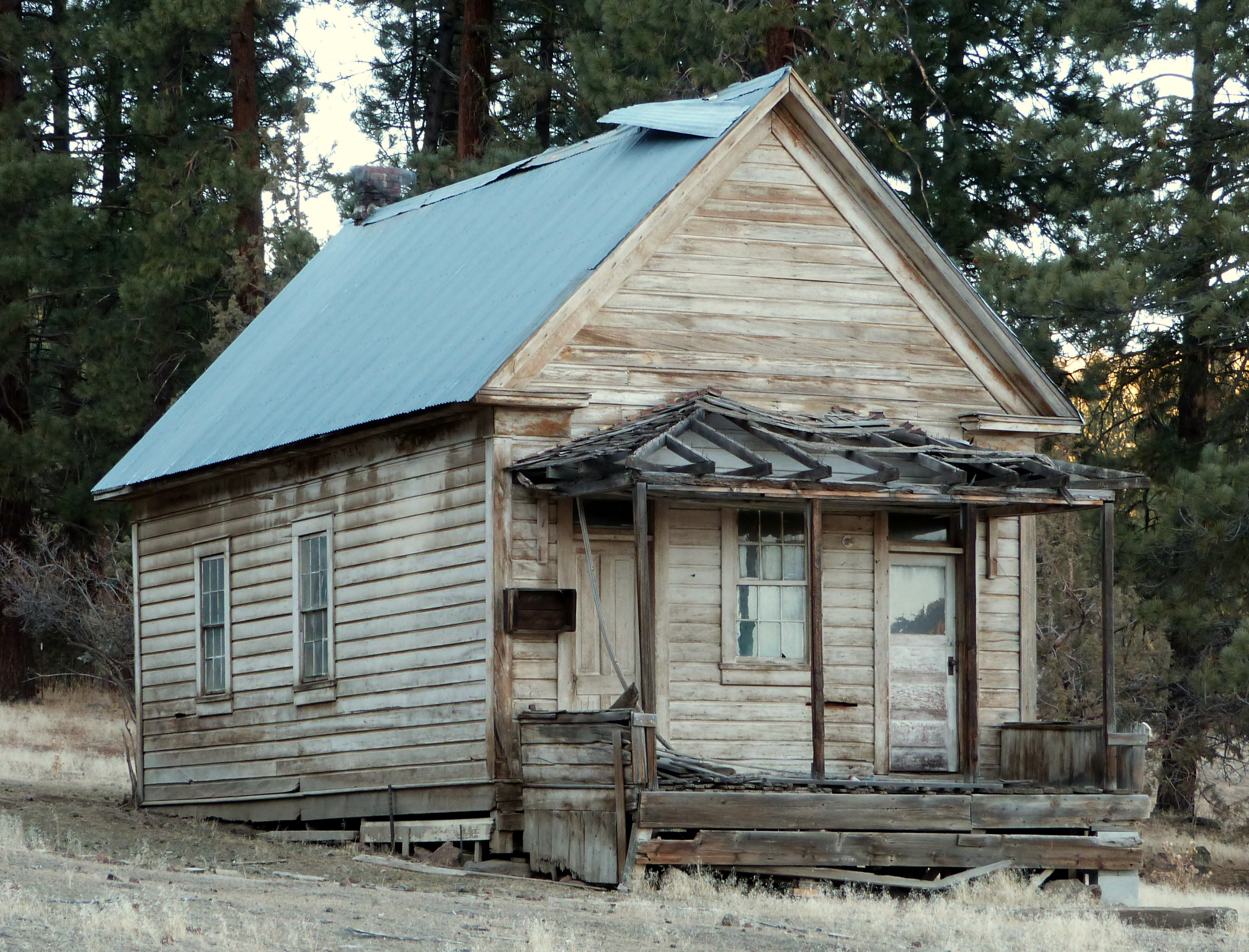

- Location within California
- Nearest city: Likely, California
- Coordinates: 41°15′59″N 120°18′39″W
- Area: less than one acre
- Built: 1900
- NRHP reference No.: 99000582
- Added to NRHP: May 20, 1999

The Jess Valley Schoolhouse, in Modoc County, California near Likely, California, was listed on the National Register of Historic Places in 1999.

It is a one-room schoolhouse located on County Road 64 about 12.2 miles (19.6 km) east of Likely.

It is a woodframe building about 19 by 32 feet (5.8 m × 9.8 m) in plan. feet. It faces south, is front gabled and has gable returns and corner boards. Its original shake roof was replaced with tin.

It was built by Orville and Gus Sweeney who probably also designed it, though its "design is typical of one-room schools built throughout the country in the late 1800s and early 1900s."
