= Wendel, California =

Unincorporated community in California, United States

Wendel
- Unincorporated community
- Location in California Wendel (the United States)
- Coordinates: 40°20′54″N 120°14′01″W
- Country: United States
- State: California
- County: Lassen
- Elevation: 4,012 ft (1,223 m)

Wendel is an unincorporated community in Lassen County, California, United States. It is located 23 miles (37 km) east-southeast of Susanville, at an elevation of 4012 feet (1223 m). Wendel's ZIP Code is 96136.

The Wendel post office opened in 1915 (when it was transferred from Purser), closed in 1920, and re-opened in 1921. The name Wendel was bestowed by Thomas Moran, the president of the Nevada–California–Oregon Railway, for a friend.

Wendel was once a crew change point for the railroad, with housing, hotels, and other services for train workers. Most of the railroad infrastructure in Wendel was demolished in 1996, and the railroad is now abandoned. A few homes can still be found in the area, however.
