= Reno station (Nevada–California–Oregon Railway) =

- Nevada-California-Oregon Railroad Depot
- U.S. National Register of Historic Places
- Nevada Historical Marker No. 210
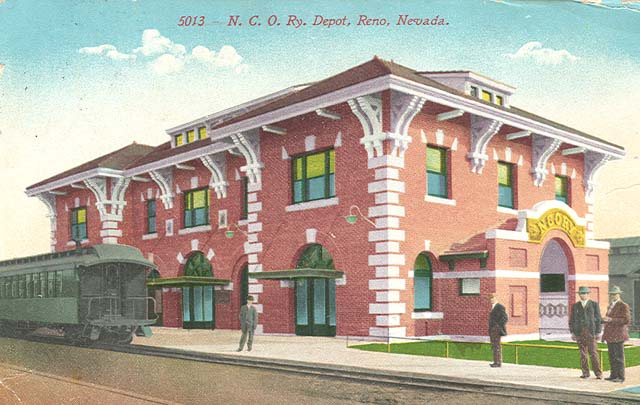
- Postcard view of the depot

- Location within Nevada Location within the United States
- Location: 325 E 4th St; Reno, Nevada
- Coordinates: 39°31′52″N 119°48′34″W
- Built: 1910
- Architect: Frederic Joseph DeLongchamps
- Architectural style: Mission eclectic
- Website: http://thedepotreno.com/
- NRHP reference No.: 80002469
- Marker No.: 210
- Added to NRHP: February 8, 1980

The Nevada-California-Oregon Railroad Depot was built by the Nevada-California-Oregon Railway (NCO) in 1910 in Reno, Nevada. It is Nevada Historical Marker number 210. It is also listed in the National Register of Historic Places. The building today is used for a restaurant and microbrewery called The Depot Craft Brewery Distillery

== Overview ==
The depot is a two-story rectangular brick building that has a variety of design styles. The low-pitch hip roof is clad in red Spanish tiles. The lower floor has Roman arches around the doors and windows. There is extensive use of concrete in this building, in the quoins, keystones, imposts, and sills.

The depot was listed in the National Register of Historic Places for its association with the Nevada-California-Oregon Railway, for the railroad development of Nevada, and for its distinctive architecture.

== History ==
The railroad was organized in Reno in June 1880 as the Nevada and Oregon Railroad. It was decided that the best plan was to build north to the Columbia River to service cattle ranches and farms in northeastern California and eastern Oregon. The company decided to lay narrow-gauge track because it was cheaper than standard gauge construction. It became one of the longest narrow-gauge railroads in the United States.

The company's first Reno station was of wooden construction, located immediately to the north of the Central Pacific Railroad (later Southern Pacific) Reno station. It was destroyed in a fire in 1889 and replaced with a brick building on the same site. After traffic along the railroad increased in the decade of the 1900s, the company expanded its Reno operations, leading to the opening of a greatly expanded passenger depot on June 9, 1910 adjacent to the company's yards on 4th Street.

The railroad did well until the mid-1910s. In 1917, the railroad sold all of its holdings in the State of Nevada to the Western Pacific Railroad (WP). The WP then replaced the narrow-gauge track with standard gauge. The depot continued to serve the citizens of Reno until 1937. In 1937 there was no longer passenger service, however the depot was used as offices by the WP until 1975. The building was then sold to private individuals who used it for a variety of functions. After being abandoned for several years, in 2014, the building was heavily renovated for use as a restaurant and microbrewery called The Depot Craft Brewery Distillery, which opened the following year. The decor of the building acknowledges its past as a railroad depot and includes maps and schematics and other artifacts from the NCO and WP Railroads.

Preceding station	Nevada–California–Oregon Railway	Following station
Summit toward Lakeview	Main Line	Terminus
Preceding station	Western Pacific Railroad	Following station
Anderson toward Reno Junction	Reno Branch	Terminus
