= Lakeview station (Oregon) =

- Nevada–California–Oregon Railway Passenger Station
- U.S. National Register of Historic Places
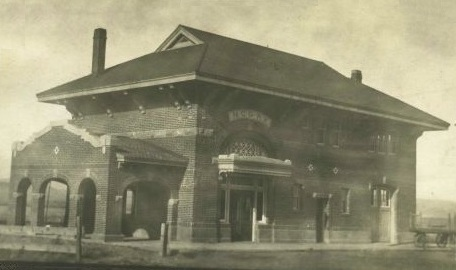
- Lakeview passenger depot in 1915
- Location: Lakeview, Oregon, U.S.A.
- Coordinates: 42°11′22″N 120°21′21″W
- Built: 1912
- Architect: Frederick J. DeLongchamps
- Architectural style: California Mission with Prairie School influence
- NRHP reference No.: 83002157
- Added to NRHP: 1983

The Nevada–California–Oregon Railway Passenger Station (also known as the Lakeview Depot) is a historic train station in Lakeview, Oregon, United States. It was built in 1912 by contractor I. A. Underwood from plans by architect Frederic DeLongchamps. It was the northern terminus of the Nevada–California–Oregon Railway. The Southern Pacific Railroad company owned and operated the depot from 1928 until 1975, when it was closed. Since 1978, the building has been used as a law office and later a private residence. Because of its importance to local history, the depot was listed on the National Register of Historic Places in 1983.

== History ==
The town of Lakeview was established in 1876. The community grew slowly because of its isolated frontier location. In May 1900, a large fire destroyed 64 of the town's 66 buildings, leaving 700 residents homeless. Most of the homes and business structures were replaced by October of that year. Much of the reconstruction was financed by Doctor Bernard Daly, a local physician, banker, and businessman. A study prepared for the Town of Lakeview Planning Office, Bend, Oregon.

In 1908, a new county courthouse was built in the center of town on the south side of Center Street (the town's main east-west street) between E Street and F Street (the town's main north-south streets). In 1912, the Nevada–California–Oregon Railway reached Lakeview, spurring commercial growth in the community. study prepared for the Town of Lakeview Planning Office, Bend, Oregon. In the two years following the arrival of the railroad, over $200,000 was invested in Lakeview's downtown business area. One of the most important buildings constructed during this period was the Nevada–California–Oregon Railway Passenger Station. The station cost $15,000 to build. It was dedicated on 5 November 1912. The only two local construction projects undertaken during this period that were more costly were the Heryford Brothers Building and Lakeview's high school building.

In 1928, the Nevada–California–Oregon Railway was acquired by the Southern Pacific Railroad. Passenger service to Lakeview was discontinued in 1937. Southern Pacific continued its freight service until 1975, when the depot was closed. Beginning in 1978, the building was leased for use as a law office and residence. After a legal battle over the property's title, the depot building and approximately 0.5 acres (0.20 ha) of land surrounding it were conveyed to a private owner.

The Lakeview Depot is significant because it is an intact example of early 20th century railroad station architecture in eastern Oregon. It is also the only documented example of an Oregon building designed by Frederick J. DeLongchamps. Because of its architectural interest and the important role it played in the commercial development of Lakeview, the Nevada–California–Oregon Railway Passenger Station was listed on the National Register of Historic Places on 22 August 1983. Today, the depot is privately owned.

== Structure ==
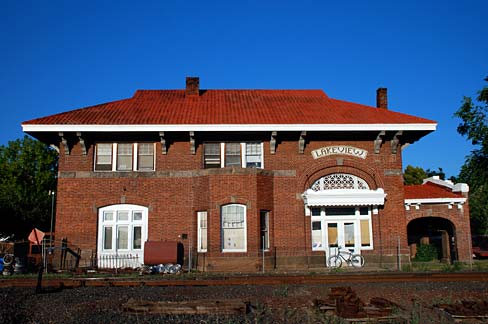
The former station, now a private residence, in 2009

The historic Nevada–California–Oregon passenger station is located on the western edge of Lakeview, facing a T-intersection. Center Street, the city's main east-west street, ends at N Street immediately in front of the depot. The building is set parallel with the north-south oriented railroad tracks. The depot's main entrance faces east, looking out across a small parking lot and directly up Center Street. The property to the north, south, and west of the depot is undeveloped. The rear of the building faces the railroad tracks, which are located approximately 30 feet (9.1 m) from the station's rear entrance.

The Lakeview Depot was designed by Frederick J. DeLongchamps, a well known regional architect with offices in San Francisco and Reno. The depot was constructed by I. A. (Andy) Underwood, a prominent Lakeview builder. The depot is a two-story Mission Revival style structure with some Prairie School architectural influences. It is a brick masonry structure built on a concrete foundation with a footprint measuring 60 feet (18 m) by 30 feet (9.1 m). The depot has a hip roof, covered with tin sheets stamped to look like mission tiles. The structure has wide overhanging eaves supported by large triangular brackets set in pairs. There is an arcade style pavilion attached to the south end of the building. The pavilion is covered by curvilinear gable typical of the California Mission style. The banks of windows under the overhanging eaves and a prominent belt course of masonry high on the exterior walls are typical of the Prairie School architecture. These exterior features are all common characteristics of railroad passenger stations constructed during the period just prior to World War I.

The depot's trim features are of rock-faced ashlar. The original tile marquee is located above the double-doors main passenger entrance. Ceramic tile is also used in a lozenge-shaped decorative accent on the south face of the pavilion at the south end of the building. The depot windows are double-hung sash. They have small panes in the upper sash with a single pane below. The baggage room doors are double-leaf with an arched header.

The ground floor interior is typical of railroad passenger stations of that era. The old telegraph office is located on the west side of the building overlooking the railroad tracks. This allowed the telegraph operator to see incoming trains from inside the building. The waiting room is located at the south end of the building. The baggage and freight room is located at the north end with the railroad agent's office in between. The second story was designed to be the living quarters for the station master.

The depot's exterior is unaltered from its original design and the interior is structurally intact except for a false ceiling installed in the passenger waiting room. The date of this alteration is unknown. The station's original equipment and furnishings were removed after Southern Pacific abandoned the building in 1975. Beginning in 1978, private owners replaced damaged window frames and rotted floorboards in the waiting room. Plaster walls have also been patched and refinished. The interior doors, window trim, staircase, and exposed ceiling beams have been stripped and refinished to restore their original form and treatment.

== Location ==
The Nevada–California–Oregon Railway Passenger Station occupies the southwest quarter of the northwest quarter section, Section 15, Township 39 South, Range 20 East of the Willamette Meridian in Lake County, Oregon. The 0.5 acres (0.20 ha) property is located at the west end of Center Street in Lakeview. The building faces east, looking directly up Center Street. The rear of the depot faces the north-south oriented railroad tracks.

Preceding station	Nevada–California–Oregon Railway	Following station
Terminus	Main Line	Fairport toward Reno
