= Nevada and Oregon Railroad =

19th century American railway

Overview
- Headquarters: Reno, Nevada
- Locale: Reno, Nevada
- Dates of operation: 1880–1893
- Successor: Nevada–California–Oregon Railway

Technical
- Track gauge: 3 ft (914 mm)

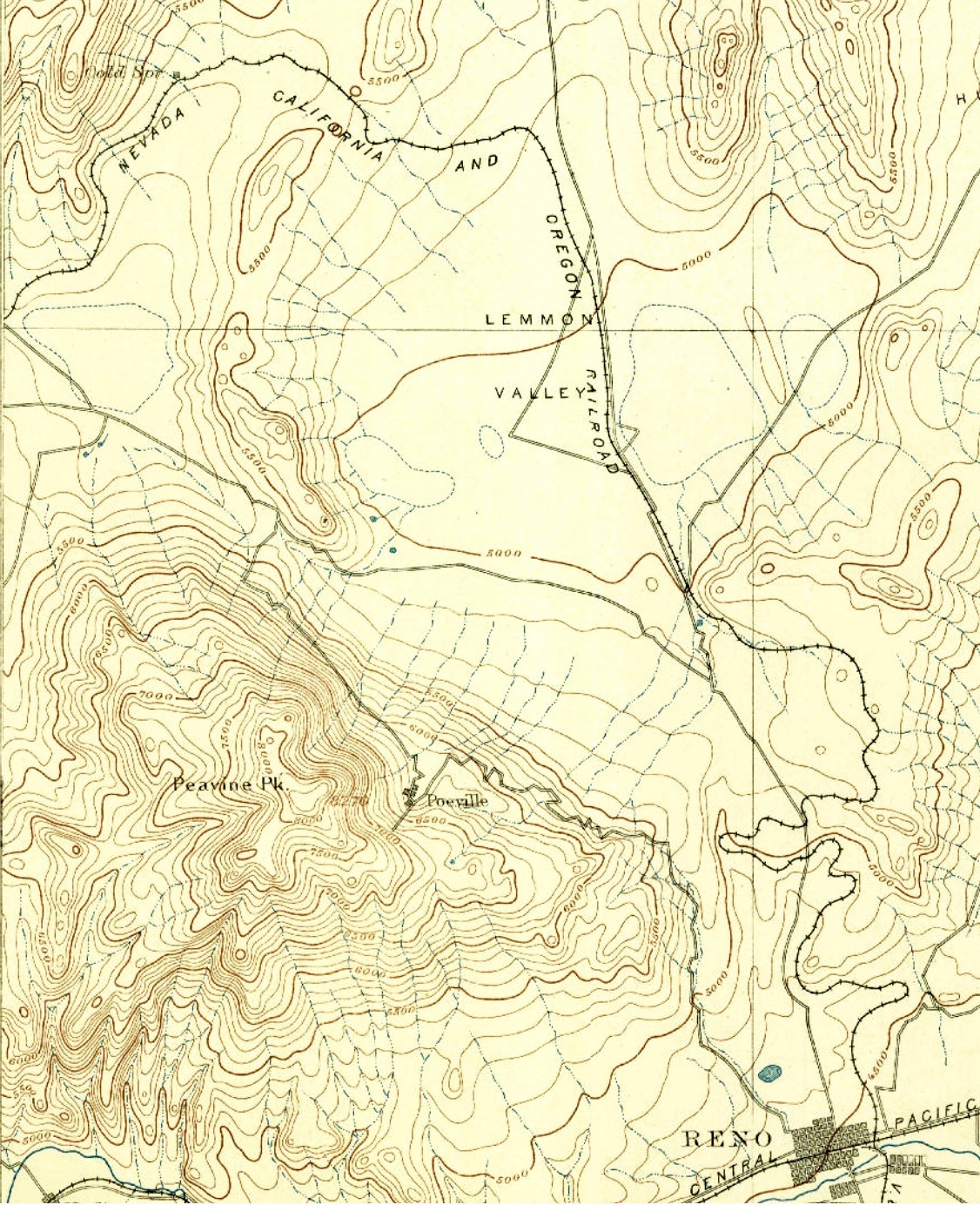
Route north of Reno in 1891

The Nevada and Oregon Railroad was an American, 3 ft (914 mm) narrow gauge railroad that operated from Reno, Nevada, then northwest to the California state line near present-day Hallelujah Junction before reaching Oneida, California in 1882. A portion of the route is part of today's Union Pacific Railroad branch connecting their Feather River mainline with Reno. The Nevada and Oregon was incorporated on June 5, 1880, and was headquartered at Reno. It was sold to the Moran Brothers, a group of New York investors, at foreclosure in 1884 and operated unofficially as the Nevada and California Railroad. In 1893 the Moran Brothers sold the railroad and it was reorganized as the Nevada–California–Oregon Railway.

== History ==
=== Western Nevada Railroad ===
The railroad traces its history back to December 12, 1879, when the Western Nevada Railroad was incorporated east of Reno at Wadsworth. The Western Nevada proposed to build from Walker Lake (near Hawthorne) to the mining town of Bodie, California. No tracks were constructed on the line. Within six months the project was abandoned and the Nevada and Oregon Railroad was incorporated in Reno in place of the Western Nevada Railroad.
