= Alturas, California =

City in California, United States

Alturas, California q̓ússi álléq̓tawí (Achumawi)
- City
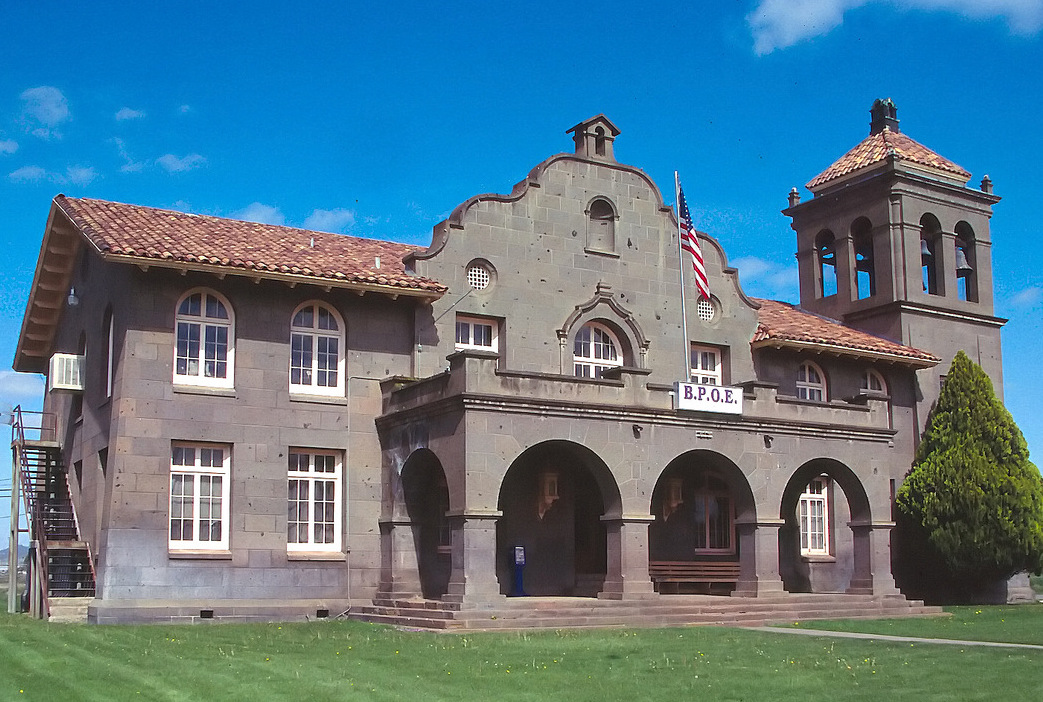
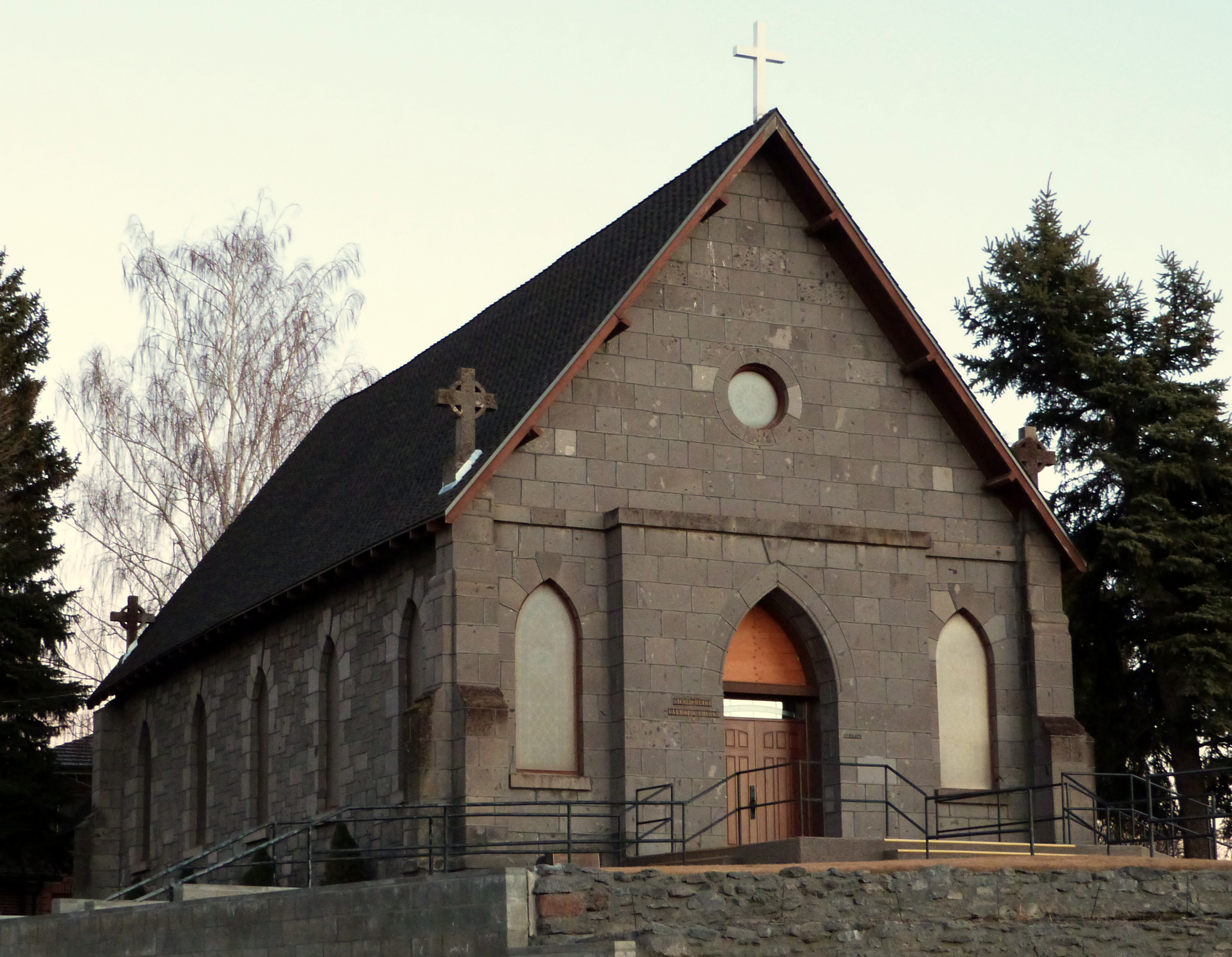
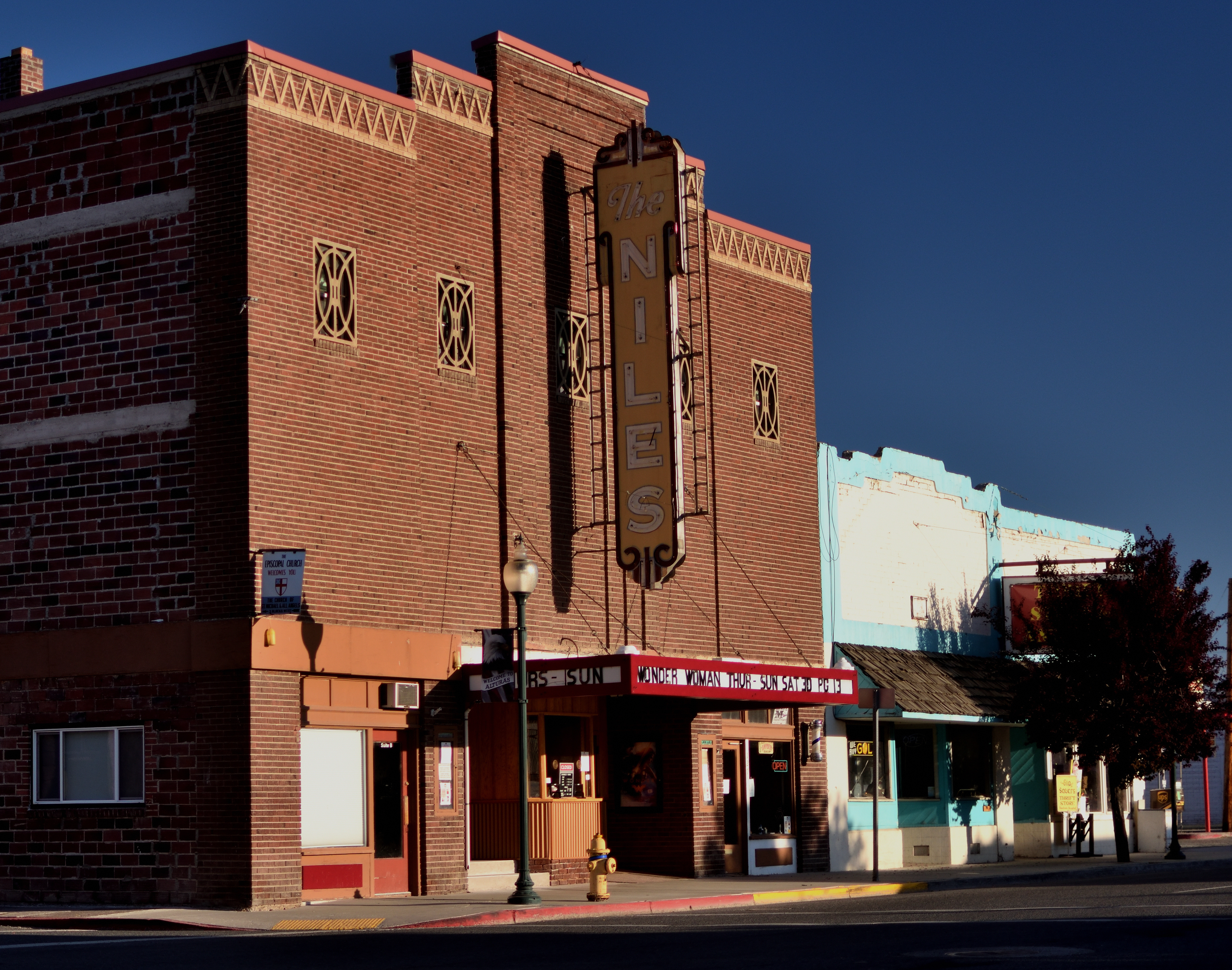
- Top: Nevada-California-Oregon Railway Building (left), Modoc County Courthouse (right); bottom: Sacred Heart Church (left), Niles Theater (right)

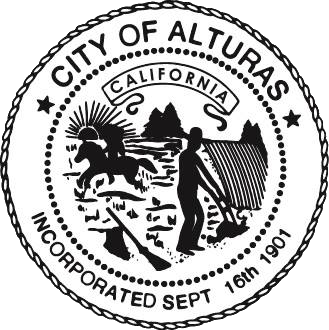
- Seal
- Motto: "Where the West Still Lives"
- Interactive map of Alturas, California
- Location in California Location in the United States
- Coordinates: 41°29′14″N 120°32′33″W
- Country: United States
- State: California
- County: Modoc
- Incorporated: September 16, 1901

Government
  - Mayor: Paul Minchella

Area
  - Total: 2.85 sq mi (7.39 km^{2})
  - Land: 2.84 sq mi (7.35 km^{2})
  - Water: 0.019 sq mi (0.05 km^{2}) 0.57%
- Elevation: 4,370 ft (1,330 m)

Population (2020)
  - Total: 2,715
  - Density: 957/sq mi (369/km^{2})
- Time zone: UTC-08:00 (PST)
  - Summer (DST): UTC-07:00 (PDT)
- ZIP code: 96101
- Area code: 530, 837
- FIPS code: 06-01444
- GNIS ID: 277469, 2409688
- Website: www.cityofalturas.us

Alturas (Spanish for "Heights"; Achumawi: q̓ússi álléq̓tawí) is the only incorporated city in Modoc County, California, United States, of which it is also the county seat. Located in the Shasta Cascade region of Northern California, the city had a population of 2,715 at the 2020 census. Alturas is located at the confluence of the south and north forks of the Pit River, east of the center of Modoc County, at an elevation of 4,370 feet (1,330 m). Alturas is one of the largest cities in the region and a local economic hub.

== History ==
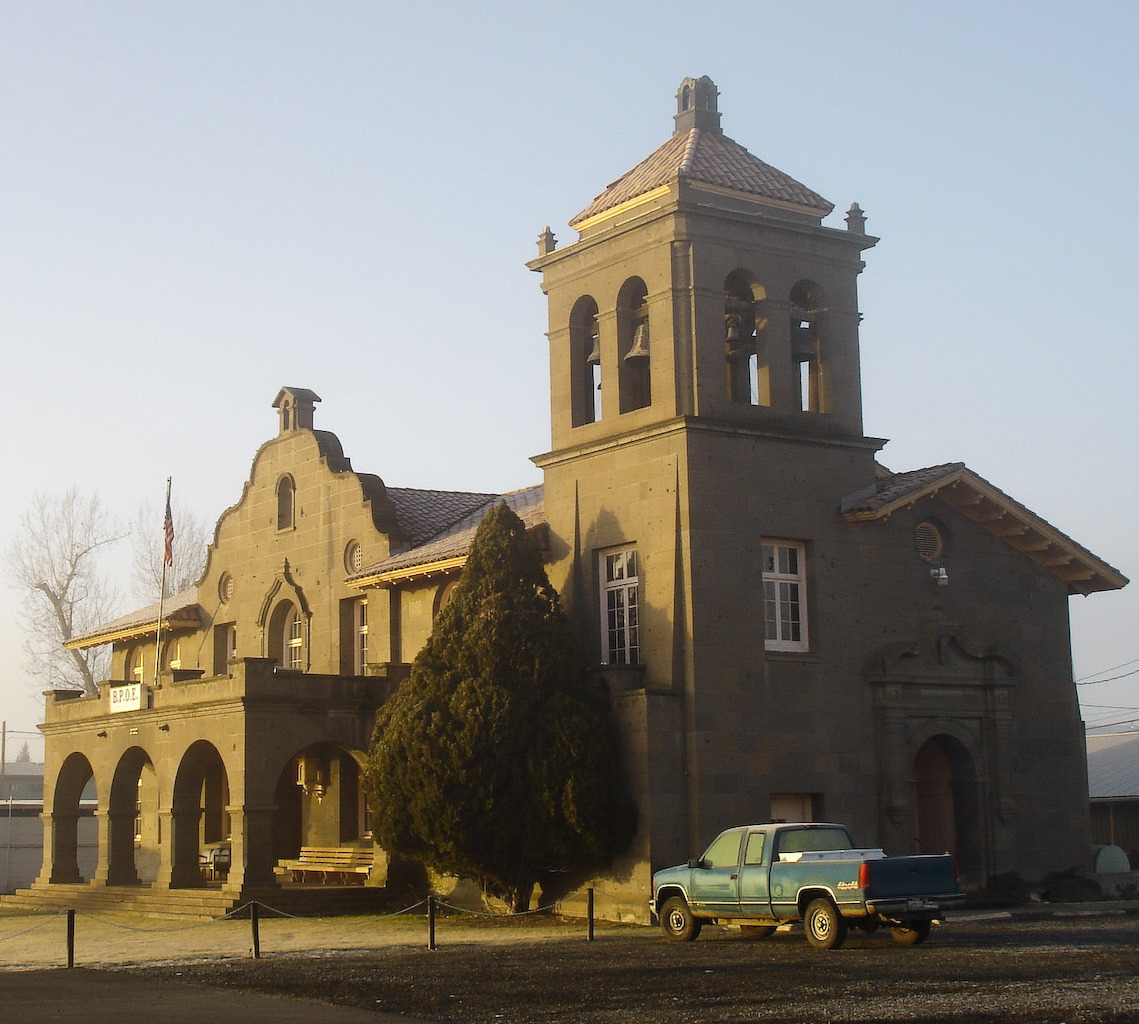
The Nevada-California-Oregon Railway Building, built 1917–18

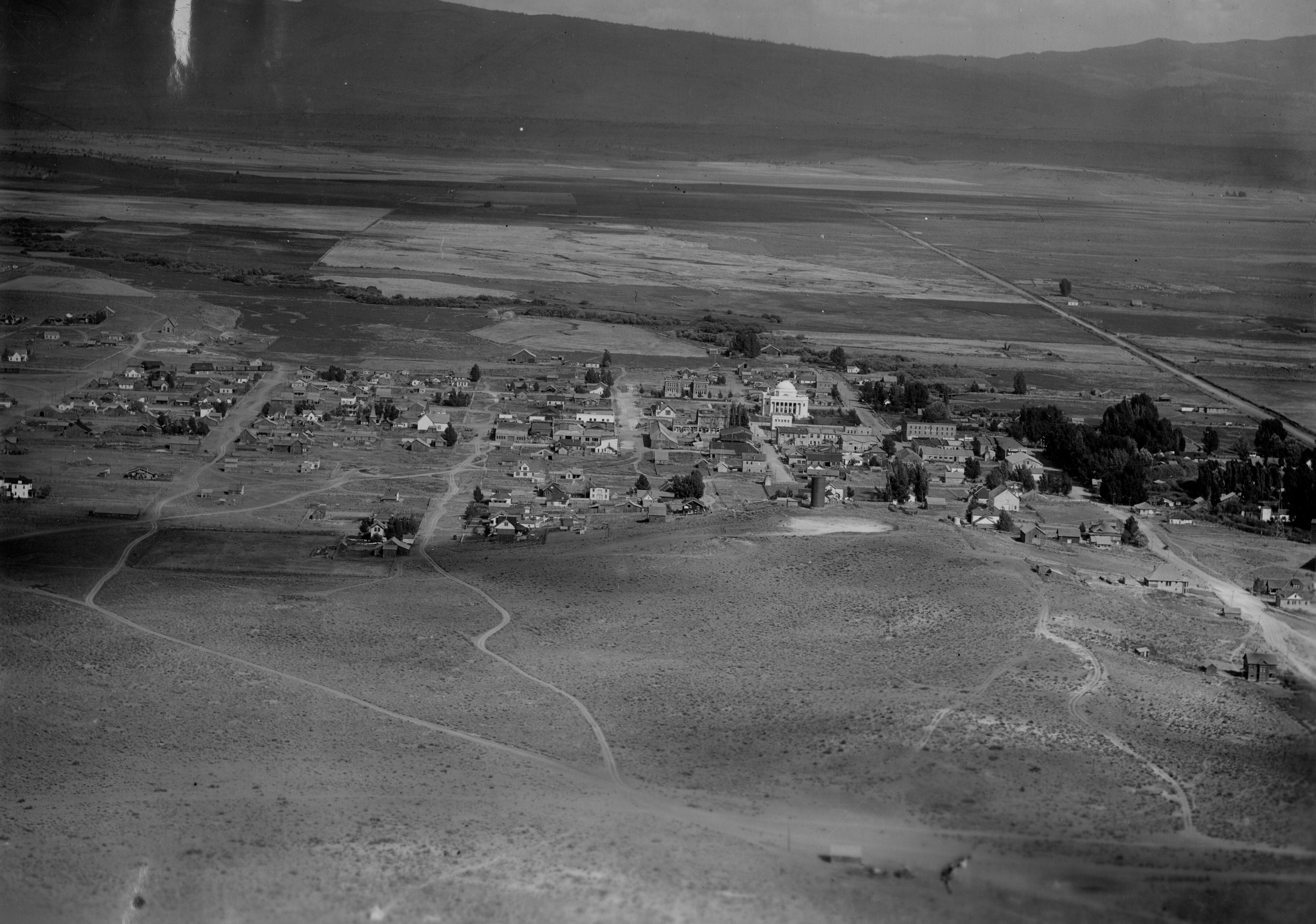
Alturas in 1920

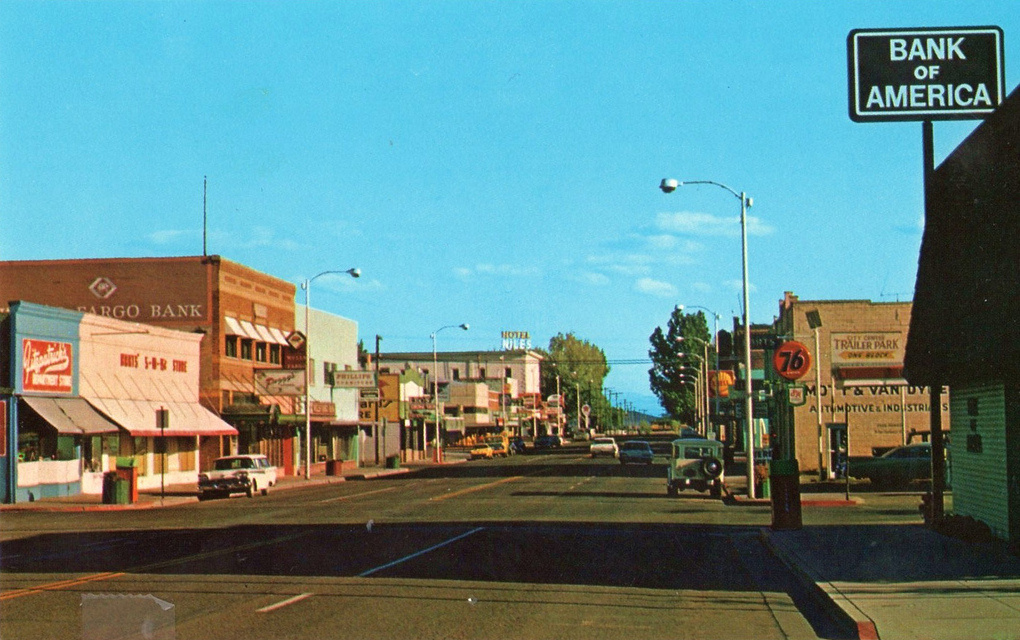
Downtown Alturas in 1975

Alturas occupies what was initially an Achumawi (Pit River) village known as Kosealekte or Kasalektawi (Achumawi: q̓ússi álléq̓tawí). The city was initially known as Dorris Bridge or Dorris' Bridge, named after Pressley and James Dorris, who built a bridge across the Pit River at this location.

The Dorris Bridge post office opened in 1871. The town was renamed Dorrisville in 1874 and Alturas in 1876, the latter meaning "heights" in Spanish. The census of 1880 showed a population of 148. However, settlement continued over the next two decades, until the city was incorporated on September 16, 1901. Because of its central location, Alturas became the county seat when Modoc County formed in 1874, even though both Adin and Cedarville were then larger towns.

== Geography ==
Alturas straddles the North Fork of the Pit River, near its confluence with the South Fork in the north end of South Fork Valley, in the extreme northeastern corner of California at 41°29′14″N 120°32′33″W. The tall Warner Mountains lie to the east, the wetlands and wild rice fields of South Fork Valley to the south, and the extensive Modoc Plateau to the north.

According to the United States Census Bureau, the city has a total area of 2.9 square miles (7.4 km^{2}), of which 0.63% is water.

=== Climate ===
The climate in Alturas is cold semi-arid (Köppen: BSk), bordering humid continental (Dsb). The average January temperatures are a high of 43.0 °F (6.1 °C) and a low of 20.6 °F (−6.3 °C). The average July temperatures are a high of 89.1 °F (31.7 °C) and a low of 47.2 °F (8.4 °C). There are an average of 39.8 days with highs of 90 °F (32.2 °C) or higher and an average of 195.5 days with lows of 32 °F (0 °C) or lower. The record high was 107 °F (41.7 °C) on July 19, 1960, and July 10–11, 2002, and the record low was −34 °F (−36.7 °C) on December 9, 1972. Freezing temperatures have occurred in every month of the year; cool nights are common even on the hottest summer days.

Precipitation averages 11.68 inches (297 mm) annually. There are an average of 90.8 days with measurable precipitation. The wettest year was 1952 with 20.80 in (528 mm) and the driest year was 2013 with 6.29 in (160 mm). The most precipitation in one month was 6.17 in (156.7 mm) in October 1962, and the most in 24 hours was 3.51 in (89.2 mm) on December 11, 1937. Snowfall averages 30.9 in (78 cm) per season. The most snowfall in a season was 85.5 in (217 cm) in 1952.

Climate data for Alturas, California (Alturas Municipal Airport), 1991–2020 normals, extremes 1935–present
Month	Jan	Feb	Mar	Apr	May	Jun	Jul	Aug	Sep	Oct	Nov	Dec	Year
Record high °F (°C)	69 (21)	72 (22)	82 (28)	85 (29)	95 (35)	105 (41)	107 (42)	106 (41)	106 (41)	93 (34)	82 (28)	71 (22)	107 (42)
Mean maximum °F (°C)	56.6 (13.7)	60.4 (15.8)	69.4 (20.8)	76.5 (24.7)	85.3 (29.6)	93.2 (34.0)	99.1 (37.3)	98.0 (36.7)	92.8 (33.8)	82.1 (27.8)	69.5 (20.8)	55.2 (12.9)	100.3 (37.9)
Mean daily maximum °F (°C)	43.0 (6.1)	46.6 (8.1)	52.7 (11.5)	58.4 (14.7)	67.9 (19.9)	78.2 (25.7)	89.1 (31.7)	87.3 (30.7)	79.7 (26.5)	65.7 (18.7)	50.8 (10.4)	41.0 (5.0)	63.4 (17.4)
Daily mean °F (°C)	31.8 (−0.1)	34.8 (1.6)	39.6 (4.2)	44.3 (6.8)	52.5 (11.4)	60.2 (15.7)	68.2 (20.1)	65.8 (18.8)	58.5 (14.7)	47.5 (8.6)	37.7 (3.2)	30.5 (−0.8)	47.6 (8.7)
Mean daily minimum °F (°C)	20.6 (−6.3)	23.0 (−5.0)	26.5 (−3.1)	30.1 (−1.1)	37.2 (2.9)	42.2 (5.7)	47.2 (8.4)	44.2 (6.8)	37.2 (2.9)	29.3 (−1.5)	24.5 (−4.2)	20.0 (−6.7)	31.8 (−0.1)
Mean minimum °F (°C)	−0.5 (−18.1)	6.2 (−14.3)	11.1 (−11.6)	17.5 (−8.1)	23.9 (−4.5)	30.3 (−0.9)	36.4 (2.4)	34.4 (1.3)	26.0 (−3.3)	15.5 (−9.2)	5.9 (−14.5)	−0.6 (−18.1)	−7.1 (−21.7)
Record low °F (°C)	−32 (−36)	−33 (−36)	−7 (−22)	7 (−14)	14 (−10)	21 (−6)	28 (−2)	26 (−3)	15 (−9)	0 (−18)	−17 (−27)	−34 (−37)	−34 (−37)
Average precipitation inches (mm)	1.31 (33)	1.09 (28)	1.38 (35)	1.47 (37)	1.26 (32)	0.70 (18)	0.29 (7.4)	0.27 (6.9)	0.35 (8.9)	0.89 (23)	1.20 (30)	1.47 (37)	11.68 (296.2)
Average snowfall inches (cm)	8.4 (21)	6.2 (16)	5.4 (14)	2.9 (7.4)	0.9 (2.3)	0.0 (0.0)	0.0 (0.0)	0.0 (0.0)	0.0 (0.0)	0.3 (0.76)	3.5 (8.9)	6.6 (17)	34.2 (87.36)
Average extreme snow depth inches (cm)	4.4 (11)	3.0 (7.6)	2.6 (6.6)	1.1 (2.8)	0.4 (1.0)	0.0 (0.0)	0.0 (0.0)	0.0 (0.0)	0.0 (0.0)	0.2 (0.51)	1.6 (4.1)	2.6 (6.6)	5.6 (14)
Average precipitation days (≥ 0.01 in)	11.0	10.7	11.3	10.7	8.6	4.6	2.0	2.1	2.9	5.2	9.6	12.1	90.8
Average snowy days (≥ 0.1 in)	4.0	3.3	2.6	1.4	0.4	0.0	0.0	0.0	0.0	0.3	1.8	3.3	17.1
Source 1: NOAA
Source 2: National Weather Service (snow/snow days 1935–2018)

== Demographics ==
Historical population
Census	Pop.	Note	%±
1880	148		—
1910	916		—
1920	979		6.9%
1930	2,338		138.8%
1940	2,090		−10.6%
1950	2,819		34.9%
1960	2,819		0.0%
1970	2,799		−0.7%
1980	3,025		8.1%
1990	3,231		6.8%
2000	2,892		−10.5%
2010	2,827		−2.2%
2020	2,715		−4.0%
U.S. Decennial Census

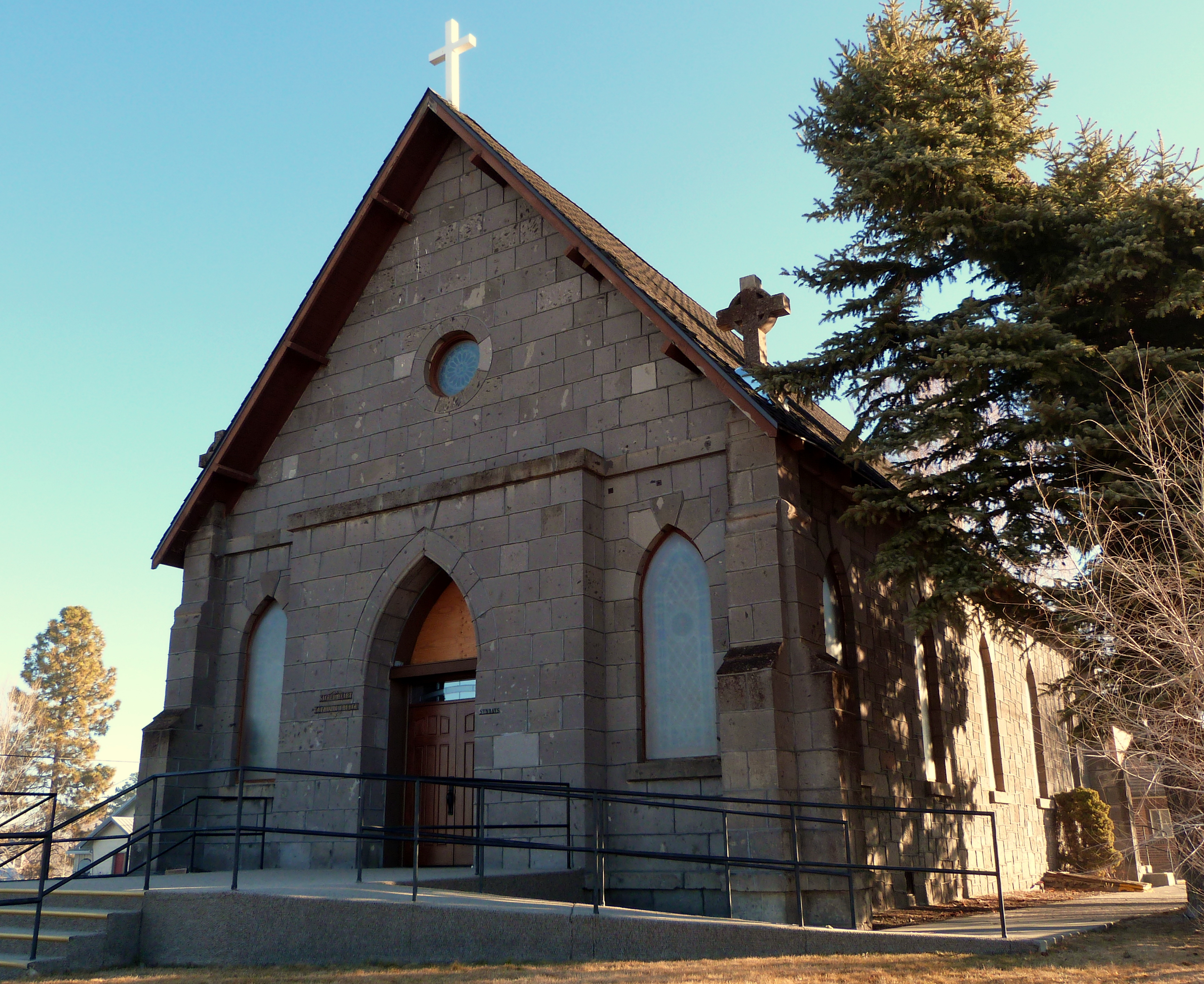
Sacred Heart Church of the Catholic Diocese of Sacramento

=== Racial and ethnic composition ===
Alturas city, California – Racial composition Note: the US Census treats Hispanic/Latino as an ethnic category. This table excludes Latinos from the racial categories and assigns them to a separate category. Hispanics/Latinos may be of any race.
Race (NH = Non-Hispanic)	2020	2010	2000	1990	1980
White alone (NH)	73% (1,982)	80.9% (2,286)	80.2% (2,319)	89.1% (2,879)	94.1% (2,847)
Black alone (NH)	1.1% (31)	0.5% (14)	0.2% (7)	0.4% (13)	0% (0)
American Indian alone (NH)	3.2% (88)	2.1% (59)	3.6% (105)	3.4% (109)	0.6% (19)
Asian alone (NH)	1.3% (36)	1.4% (40)	0.7% (21)	0.5% (16)	0.4% (12)
Pacific Islander alone (NH)	0.3% (7)	0.2% (7)	0.1% (3)		
Other race alone (NH)	0.7% (18)	0.1% (3)	0.5% (15)	0.1% (2)	0% (0)
Multiracial (NH)	5.1% (138)	2.5% (71)	2.7% (78)	—	—
Hispanic/Latino (any race)	15.3% (415)	12.3% (347)	11.9% (344)	6.6% (212)	4.9% (147)

=== 2020 census ===
As of the 2020 census, Alturas had a population of 2,715. The population density was 957.3 inhabitants per square mile (369.6/km^{2}). The census reported that 99.2% of the population lived in households, 0.3% lived in non-institutionalized group quarters, and 0.6% were institutionalized. 0.0% of residents lived in urban areas, while 100.0% lived in rural areas.

There were 1,199 households, out of which 31.6% had children under the age of 18. Of all households, 35.2% were married-couple households, 7.9% were cohabiting couple households, 35.0% had a female householder with no spouse or partner present, and 21.9% had a male householder with no spouse or partner present. About 35.6% of all households were made up of individuals, and 17.1% had someone living alone who was 65 years of age or older. The average household size was 2.25. There were 702 families (58.5% of all households).

The age distribution was 24.8% under the age of 18, 6.4% aged 18 to 24, 24.5% aged 25 to 44, 24.6% aged 45 to 64, and 19.8% who were 65 years of age or older. The median age was 38.9 years. For every 100 females, there were 90.5 males, and for every 100 females age 18 and over there were 89.4 males age 18 and over.

There were 1,393 housing units at an average density of 491.2 units per square mile (189.7 units/km^{2}). Of these units, 1,199 (86.1%) were occupied and 194 (13.9%) were vacant. Of occupied units, 55.6% were owner-occupied and 44.4% were occupied by renters. The homeowner vacancy rate was 3.4% and the rental vacancy rate was 7.0%.

=== Income and poverty ===
In 2023, the US Census Bureau estimated that the median household income was $54,634, and the per capita income was $31,725.

== Economy ==
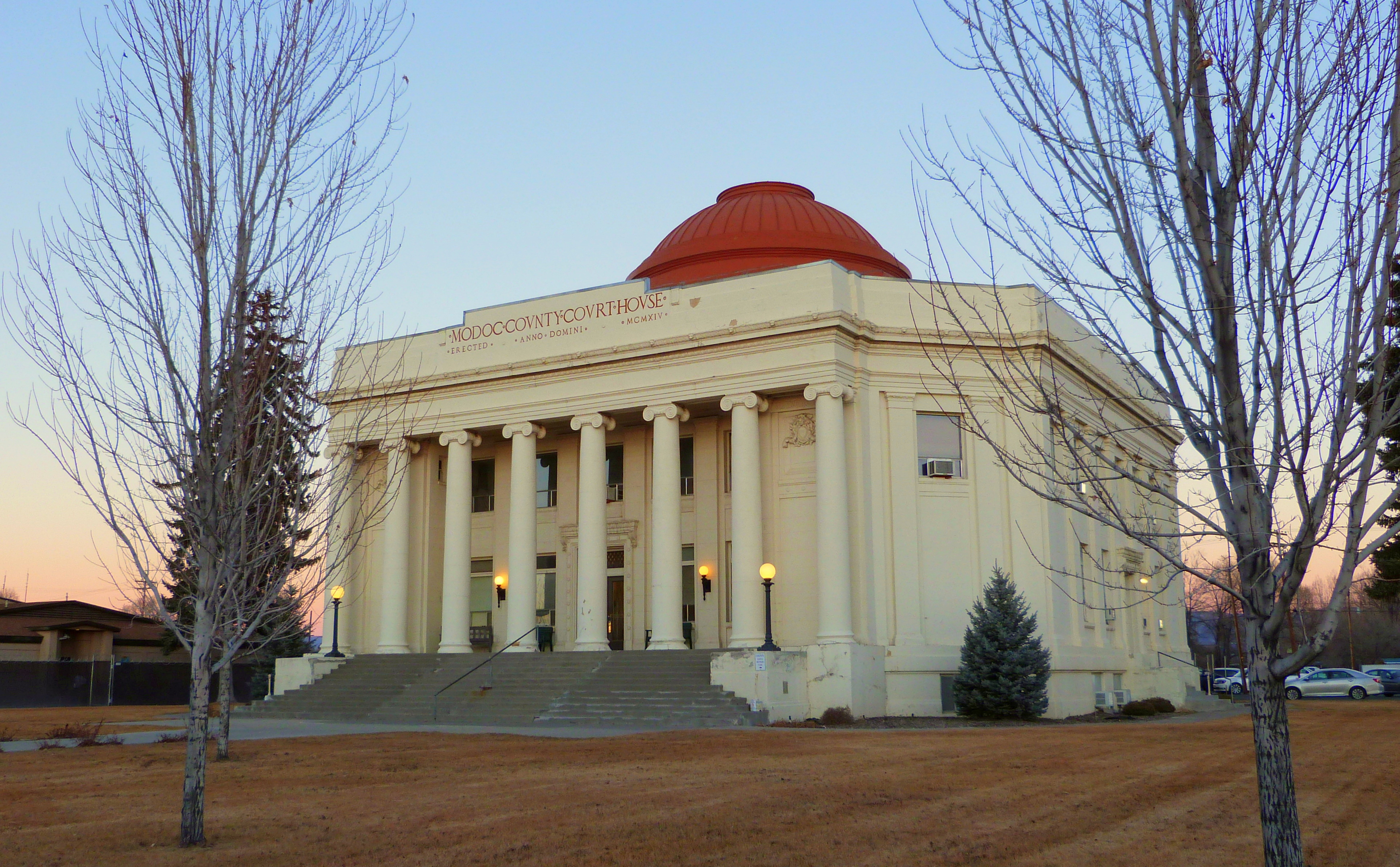
The historic Modoc County Courthouse, completed in 1914 to replace the prior courthouse built 1883–84

Alturas is the headquarters to the Modoc National Forest, the Applegate Field Office of the Bureau of Land Management, the Modoc National Wildlife Refuge and other recreation areas, and is the trade center for the agricultural region, which produces beef, sheep, potatoes, alfalfa and lumber. Despite its abundance of wilderness, recreational opportunities, hunting and fishing resources, and natural environment, tourism is not a major sector of the local economy – largely due to the city's remote location.

Local, State, Federal, and Tribal governments are the largest employers in Alturas. A vibrant timber industry collapsed in the early 1980s due to increased production costs and low market prices for softwood lumber.

The Modoc Joint Unified School District is headquartered in Alturas.

The Alturas Rancheria, a band of Pit River Indians, operates a small casino just outside the city limits.

== Government ==
In the California State Legislature, Alturas is in the 1st senatorial district, represented by Republican Megan Dahle, and the 1st Assembly district, represented by Republican Heather Hadwick.

In the United States House of Representatives, Alturas is in California's 1st congressional district, represented by Republican James Gallagher.

== Transportation ==
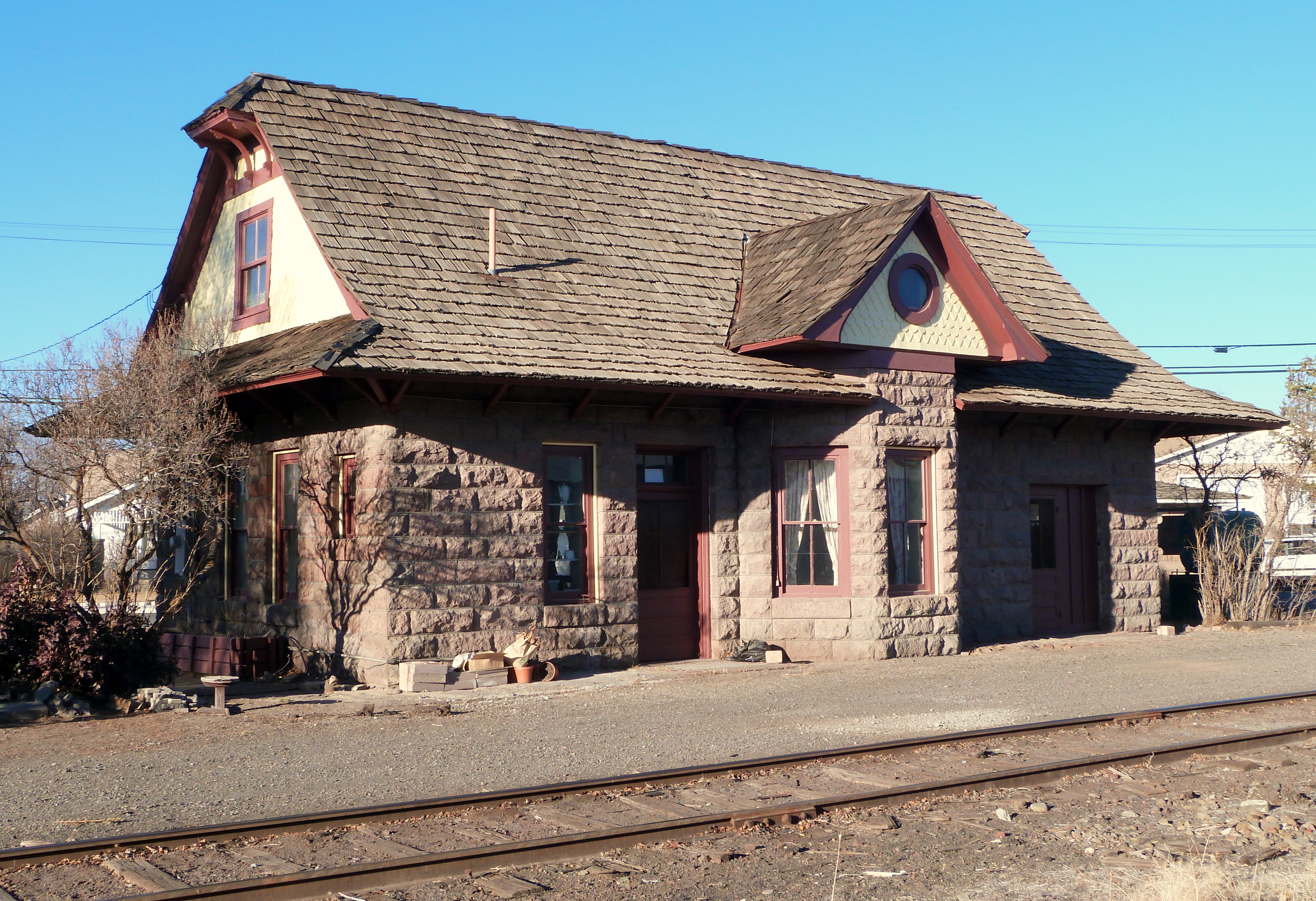
NCO Railway Depot, built 1908

Alturas is served by U.S. Route 395 and California State Route 299. U.S. 395 comes in from the south from Susanville and Reno. State Route 299 comes in from the west from Redding. Both highways merge in Alturas and head out of the city as a concurrency northeast toward Lakeview, Oregon; and Cedarville, respectively.

Sage Stage offers intercity bus service and a local dial-a-ride bus within the town.

The Modoc Subdivision track of the Union Pacific Railroad and the Lake County Railroad (of Lake County, Oregon) serve the area. Alturas Municipal Airport is a public-use, general aviation facility located one nautical mile (1.2 mi; 1.9 km) west of the city's central business district.

== Education ==
Modoc Joint Unified School District is the local school district.

== Notable people ==
- Kayte Christensen, WNBA basketball player
- Ernest S. Brown, former United States Senator from Nevada
- John E. Raker (1863–1926), Congressman from California (served 1911–1926) and author of the Raker Act
- Robert "Top Gun" Hight, NHRA drag racer John Force Racing

== See also ==
- Modoc County Historical Museum
- California Historical Landmarks in Modoc County
