= Marvin Opler =

American anthropologist and social psychiatrist

Marvin K. Opler

Marvin Kaufmann Opler (June 13, 1914 in Buffalo, New York – January 3, 1981) was an American anthropologist and social psychiatrist. His brother Morris Edward Opler was also an anthropologist who studied the Southern Athabaskan peoples of North America. Morris and Marvin Opler were the sons of Austrian-born Arthur A. Opler, a merchant, and Fanny Coleman-Hass. Marvin Opler is best known for his work as a principal investigator in the Midtown Community Mental Health Research Study (New York). This landmark study hinted at widespread stresses induced by urban life, as well as contributing to the development of the burgeoning field of social psychiatry in the 1950s.

== Biography ==
=== Education ===
Marvin Opler attended the University at Buffalo from 1931 to 1934. While there, he was a leader in the University's National Student League. He then transferred to the University of Michigan, attracted by the reputation of the American anthropologist Leslie White. Marvin Opler's admiration of White's work was in contrast to that of his brother Morris Opler. Marvin Opler was interested in the relationships between psychology and anthropology, fields which White had considered connected. Unfortunately, White was beginning to distance himself from the field of psychology at that time.

Marvin Opler was granted an A.B. in social studies from the University of Michigan in 1935. After college, he continued his academic career at Columbia University. There he had the chance to study anthropology under Ruth Benedict and Ralph Linton. At this time, Opler was conducting some of the earliest anthropological fieldwork among the Southern Utes. After completing his dissertation on the acculturation of the Ute and Paiute peoples in Colorado and Utah, he was granted a Ph.D. from Columbia in 1938.

=== Early ethnographic work ===
In his work with the Ute and Paiute peoples, Marvin Opler noted that Ute and Paiute shamans used techniques of dream analysis that shared features in common with psychoanalysis, although they were developed independently of Western psychiatric practices. He also did anthropological fieldwork among the Eastern Apache tribes, the Eskimo, and the Northwest Coast Indians in Oregon. Opler taught sociology and anthropology as the chair of anthropology at Reed College from 1938 until 1943. In 1943, Marvin Opler was appointed to the War Labor Board.

=== Work on Japanese-American internment ===
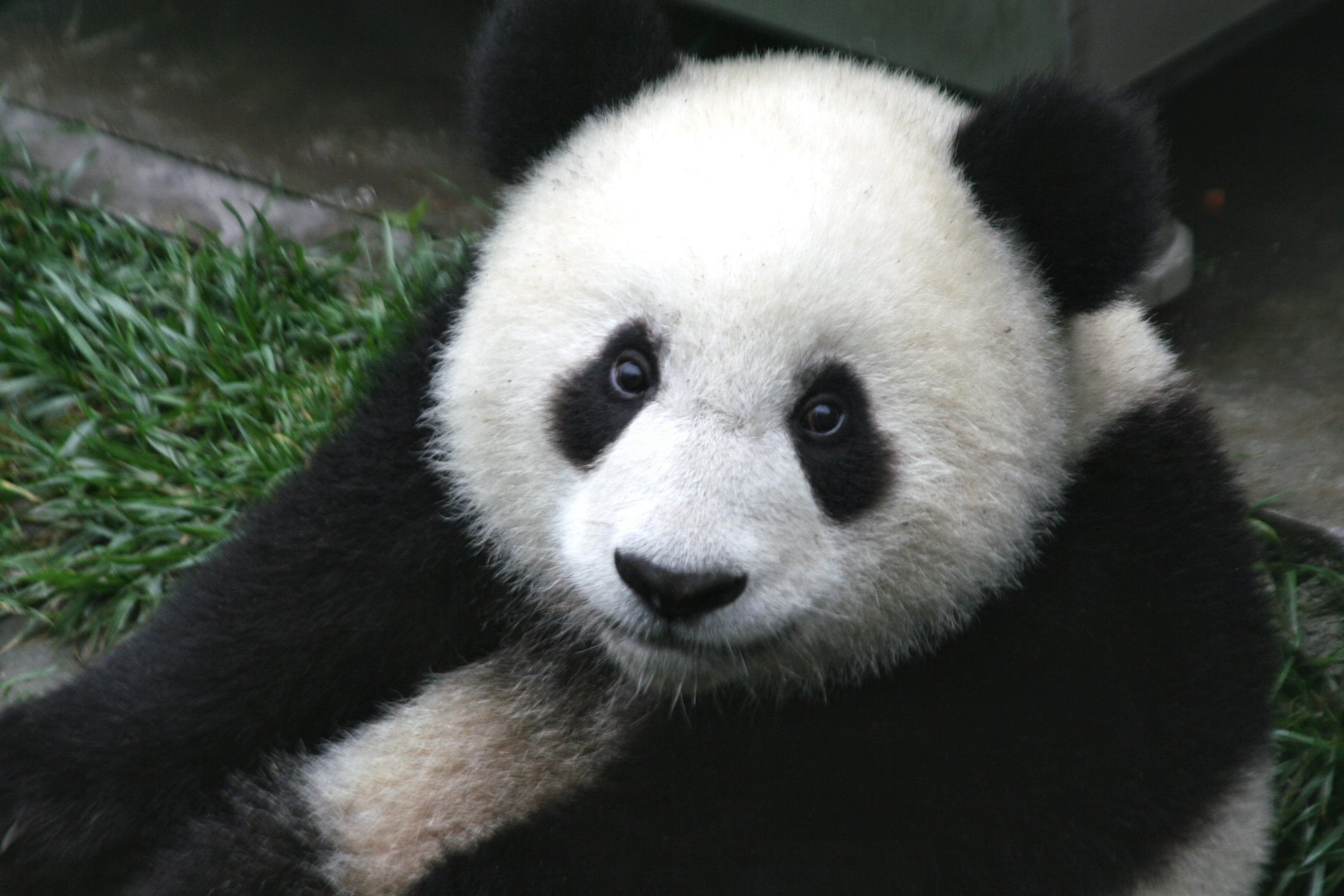
Author Barney Shallit compared Marvin Opler to "a benign, giant panda."

From 1943 until 1946, Opler worked as a Community Analyst at the Tule Lake War Relocation Center, where his critical views of the internment of Japanese Americans later led him to co-author Impounded Peoples in 1946. While at Tule Lake, he kept careful records of daily camp life. Opler documented instances of abuse at the camp and worked with lawyer Wayne M. Collins on behalf of the internees. His records included an account of "The November Incident," a protest by the residents of the camp which resulted in the takeover of Tule Lake by the US Army. Author Barney Shallit remembered Marvin Opler at Tule Lake both fondly and vividly: "with his heavy red beard and his slow, deliberate movements, he looked ... like a benign, giant panda." Marvin's wife, Charlotte Opler, enrolled their son Ricky in the Japanese nursery camp at the center, making him the only Caucasian enrolled there. Marvin Opler noted the parallels between the revival of traditional Japanese culture among the largely acculturated internees at Tule Lake and the spread of the Ghost Dance religion among Plains Indian tribes in the 19th century. Opler pointed out that both were attempts by the colonized to reassert their dignity.

Historian Peter Suzuki writes that most of the anthropologists who worked for the War Relocation Authority (WRA) accepted the government's action of interning the Japanese Americans as morally justified. Suzuki believes, however, that Marvin Opler's work was a model of the positive role that these anthropologists could have played. Suzuki suggests that Opler's acknowledgment of a wider social and political field as part of his analysis, Opler's criticism of the segregation of so-called "loyal" versus "disloyal" internees, and the respect that Opler paid to Japanese culture made his work such a model.

At Tule Lake, Marvin Opler befriended several well-known Japanese American internees. One of these was Yamato Ichihashi, one of the first academics of Asian ancestry in the United States. Ichihashi wrote a comprehensive account of his experiences as an internee. Opler was impressed by the work of George Tamura, a Japanese American artist who spent his teenage years imprisoned at Tule Lake. Marvin Opler also co-authored an article on Senryū folk poetry with another internee, F. Obayashi, which was published in the Journal of American Folklore in 1945.

In his book Threatening Anthropology anthropologist David H. Price discusses FBI documents from 1945 in which FBI Director J. Edgar Hoover ordered an FBI investigation of Marvin Opler after the discovery of a letter bearing the initial "M" in a Portland trash can. Marvin Opler was questioned by the FBI. One of many anthropologists investigated, the bureau was seeking to discover whether Opler had any Communist Party affiliation. He responded that the only party he had ever been a member of was the Democratic Party, which he had been involved in up until he moved to Tule Lake. The FBI also discovered that Opler was held in high regard both by his coworkers at Tule Lake, as well as by the interned Japanese Americans. One WRA employee informed the FBI that Marvin Opler was considered a "wobbly," a "conscientious objector," and a "long hair" by people in the WRA. This informant was unable to give any reasons for this point of view, however. The FBI described Opler as being "cooperative and courteous" and ended the investigation.

After the internment camps were closed, Opler taught anthropology and sociology at various colleges, including Occidental, Stanford, Harvard, and Tulane from 1946 until 1952. In 1947, Marvin Opler submitted an affidavit in support of the restoration of citizenship to three American citizens of Japanese ancestry who had renounced their citizenship at Tule Lake. In this affidavit, he stated that, rather than being acts of free will, it was coercion, duress, and mass compulsion that motivated many of the wartime renouncements of citizenship by Japanese Americans. At Tule Lake, he had observed many of the renouncement hearings.

=== Social psychiatry ===
It was in 1952 that Opler joined the Midtown Community Mental Health Research Study (New York), which hinted at widespread stresses and psychopathology among city-dwellers. Opler directed the Ethnic Family Operation within the Midtown Study. This portion of the project investigated sociocultural factors relating to mental health. Although Opler's work was intended to be the third volume of the study, he died before it could be published. The most complete draft of this intended third volume is housed with his papers in the Columbia Health Science Library Archives. His work in social psychiatry also yielded observations of differences in the manifestations of schizophrenia in people of different cultural backgrounds. With Leo Srole, he found evidence for an inverse relationship between mental health and social mobility. In 1957, Opler helped found the International Journal of Social Psychiatry. In 1958, Opler went to work for the State University at Buffalo, where he worked for the remainder of his career. In 1963, he was again briefly investigated by the FBI, but once again nothing came of it.

In 1964, The First International Congress of Social Psychiatry was held in London. This conference was co-organized by Opler and the British social psychiatrist Joshua Bierer. That same year, Marvin Opler toured the psychiatric hospitals of Moscow with his wife Charlotte and fellow anthropologist Robert F. Spencer. Spencer later admitted that he was not impressed by Opler's abilities as an anthropological theorist. Spencer also conceded that Spencer's own abilities did not impress himself, either. On the other hand, some scholars, such as Richard Drinnon and Peter Suzuki, seemed to have more respect for Opler's ideas. Richard Drinnon believed that Opler's insights into cultural revivalism deserved more systematic study than they had received. One of the popular articles of Opler was 'Cross-cultural aspects of kissing' which appeared in the Medical Aspects of Human Sexuality journal in 1969.

=== Family ===
In December 1935, the same year that he earned his degree from the University of Michigan, Marvin Opler married vocational specialist and student counselor Charlotte Fox, who subsequently became involved in biological research, Japanese-American rights, and environmental activism. They divorced in 1970. Their children include Ruth Opler Perry and Lewis Alan Opler. Ruth Opler Perry is a professor of literature at MIT, where she studies and teaches English literature, women's writing, and feminist theory. Lewis Opler (1948-2018) was a psychiatrist and psychopharmacologist who co-authored the PANSS, a symptom severity rating scale widely used in the study of psychosis. Several of Marvin Opler's grandchildren are also active in various fields of academia, including Dr. Curtis Perry, Dr. Mark Opler, and Dr. Daniel Opler.

=== Death ===
Marvin Kaufmann Opler died on January 3, 1981. His memorial was held in New York, where he was remembered both for his scholarly contributions as well as for his work with the community. His papers are housed in the Columbia University Health Sciences Library Archives .

== Publications ==
Marvin Opler was a prolific writer and some of his publications are listed below.

=== On anthropology ===
- With R. Linton, Acculturation in Seven American Indian Tribes, Appleton-Century-Crofts, 1940.
- Opler, Marvin K. The Integration of the Sun Dance in Ute Religion. American Anthropologist October–December, 1941 Vol.43(4):551-572.
- Women's Social Status and the Forms of Marriage. American Journal of Sociology. Spring, 1943.
- The Creative Role of Shamanism in Mescalero Apache Mythology. Journal of American Folklore. 59:268-281, 1946.
- The Creek Town and the Problem of Creek Indian Political Reorganization. in Edward Spicer, Human Problems and Technological Change, 1953.
- Contributor, North American Indians in Historical Perspective, Random House, 1971.

=== On social psychiatry ===
- Culture, Psychiatry and Human Values, C. C. Thomas, 1956.
- Entities and organization in individual and group behavior - a conceptual framework. Group Psychotherapy and Psychodrama. 9 (4): 290-300, 1956.
- Co-author, Symposium on Preventive and Social Psychiatry, Walter Reed Institute of Research, 1958.
- Co-author, Clinical Studies in Culture Conflict, G. Seward (ed.), Ronald Press, 1958.
- Cross-Cultural Uses of Psychoactive Drugs (Ethnopsychopharmacology). In W.G. Clark, Ph.D. & J. del Giudice, M.D. (editors) Principles of Psychopharmacology, pp. 31–47. New York: Academic Press, 1970.
- Editor and co-author, Culture and Mental Health, Macmillan, 1959.
- With L. Srole, T. Sanger, S. Michael, and T.A.C. Rennie, Mental Health in the Metropolis: The Midtown Manhattan Study, McGraw, 1962.
- Culture and Social Psychiatry, Atherton, 1967.
- Contributor, Modern Perspectives in International Child Psychiatry, Oliver & Boyd, 1969.
- International and cultural conflicts affecting mental health. Violence, suicide and withdrawal. American Journal of Psychotherapy, 23(4): 608-620, 1969.
- Social Conceptions of Deviance. in H. Resnik and M. Wolfgang, eds., Sexual Behaviors: Social, Clinical, and Legal Aspects. Little Brown and Co., 1972.

=== On Japanese-American internment and culture ===
- With E. Spicer and K. Luomala, Impounded People, University of Arizona Press, republished in 1969.
- A "Sumo" Tournament at Tule Lake Center. American Anthropologist. Jan-Mar, 1945 Vol.47 (1):134-139.
- With F. Obayashi. Senryu poetry as folk expression. Journal of American Folklore. 58 (1-3/45).

== Other contributions ==
He also contributed to many professional journals and held the following positions:

- Associate editor, International Journal of Social Psychiatry, 1957–58, editor, 1958–81; associate editor of American Anthropologist, 1962–65, and Psychosomatics.

== Papers and correspondence ==
Marvin K. Opler's papers and correspondence are primarily housed in the Columbia University Health Sciences Library Archives .

Other papers and correspondence of Opler's can be found in the following library collections:

- The Japanese American Research Project at the Manuscripts Division of the Charles E. Young Research Library at the University of California, Los Angeles
- The Japanese American Evacuation and Resettlement Records at the Bancroft Library of The University of California, Berkeley (finding aid available via the Online Archive of California)
- The Leslie A. White Papers at the University of Michigan's Bentley Historical Library
- The Ruth Benedict Papers at the Vassar College Library
- The Franz Boas Collection at the American Philosophical Society
- The Ralph Leon Beals Papers at the National Anthropological Archives, Smithsonian Institution
- The Elsie Clews Parsons Papers at the American Philosophical Society
- The Elizabeth Tooker Papers at the American Philosophical Society
- The William Duncan Strong Papers at the National Anthropological Archives
- The Alfred I. Hallowell Papers at the American Philosophical Society
- The E. Adamson Hoebel Papers at the American Philosophical Society
- The W. Horsley Gantt Papers at the Alan Mason Chesney Medical Archives of the Johns Hopkins Medical Institutions
- The A. L. Kroeber Papers at the University of California, Berkeley
- The Charles Easton Rothwell Papers at the Hoover Institution Archives of Stanford University (finding aid available via the Online Archive of California)
- The Yamato Ichihashi Papers at the Stanford University Archives (finding aid available via the Online Archive of California)
- The Records of the Department of Anthropology at The Bancroft Library of the University of California, Berkeley (finding aid available via the Online Archive of California)
- The Dorothy Eggan Papers at the University of Chicago
- The Marvin Farber Papers at the University archives of the State University of New York University at Buffalo
- The Charles E. Borden fonds at the University of British Columbia Archives
- The Albert Mayer Papers at the University of Chicago
- The Melville Jacobs Papers at the University of Washington Libraries
