= Tionesta =

Tionesta can refer to:

- Tionesta, California, an unincorporated town
- Tionesta, Pennsylvania, a borough
- Tionesta Township, Forest County, Pennsylvania
