= Camp Tulelake =

American isolation camp during World War II

- Tule Lake, California
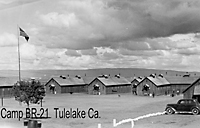

Site information
- Type: Prisoner-of-war camp and Japanese American incarceration
- Owner: Fish and Wildlife Service
- Condition: Restoration

Location
- Coordinates: 41.9688°N 121.5681°W

Site history
- Built: 1933-1935
- Built by: Civilian Conservation Corps
- In use: March 1943 - 25 April 1946

Camp Tulelake was a federal work facility and War Relocation Authority isolation center located in Siskiyou County, five miles (8 km) west of Tulelake, California. It was established by the United States government in 1935 during the Great Depression for vocational training and work relief for young men, in a program known as the Civilian Conservation Corps. The camp was established initially for CCC enrollees to work on the Klamath Reclamation Project.

During World War II, in 1942 the Tule Lake War Relocation Center was built nearby as one of ten concentration camps in the interior of the US for the incarceration of Japanese Americans who had been forcibly relocated from the West Coast, which was defined as an Exclusion Zone by the US military. Two-thirds of the 120,000 incarcerated individuals were United States citizens.

Renamed the Tule Lake Isolation Center, this facility was adapted in the wartime years to shelter Japanese-American strikebreakers used against resisters at the main segregation camp, imprison Japanese-American dissidents, and house Italian and German prisoners of war (POWs) who were assigned to work as farm laborers in the region. After the war, on 25 April 1946, the camp was transferred from the Army to the Fish and Wildlife Service, which had managed it just prior to the establishment of the segregation camp. The four remaining buildings are being restored in a project to return the camp to its 1940s appearance. It is part of Tule Lake National Monument, formerly part of World War II Valor in the Pacific National Monument.

== History ==
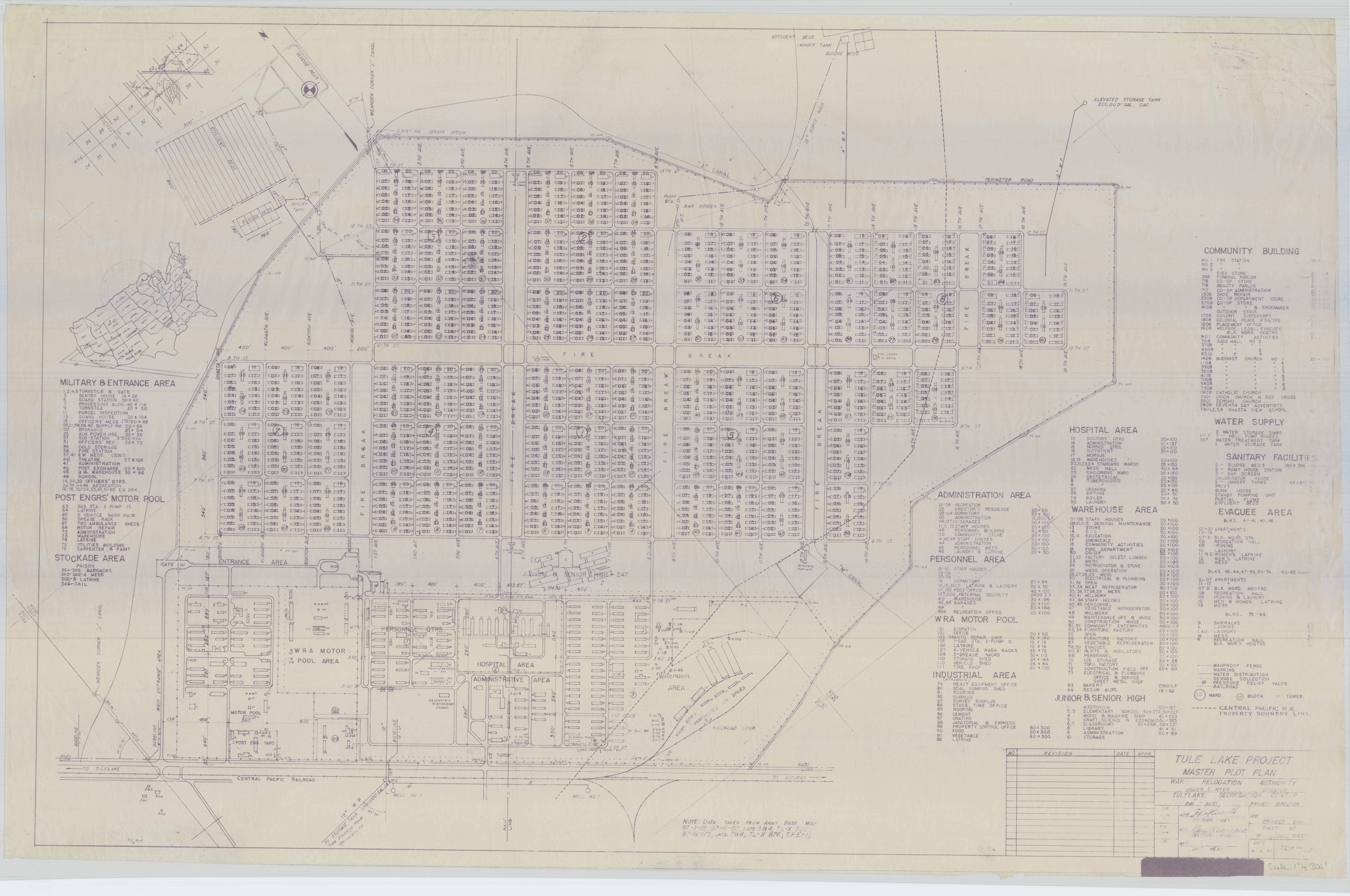
Plot plan of Camp Tulelake

The Camp Tulelake was built in 1933 as a public work relief program, part of the New Deal of President Franklin D. Roosevelt. The camp was one of several constructed for the Civilian Conservation Corps. This program provided six months to two years employment and vocational training for unemployed, unmarried men, ages 17–23 from relief families. The 23-building camp included a duck hospital, an administrative headquarters office, the supervisors' residences, and a lookout cabin on the bluff behind the Refuge Visitor Center. Most of the buildings were constructed by the enrollees. Mexican-American stonemasons constructed more than 300 feet of rock wall around the Refuge Headquarters.

The enrollees were paid $30 a month, $25 of which was sent home or put into a savings account. The program provided unskilled manual labor jobs related to the conservation and development of natural resources in rural lands owned by federal, state and local governments; workers built water control structures of timber and concrete. The CCC camp in southern Oregon dug irrigation ditches, and overall increased the Clear Lake reservoir's capacity by about 60,000 acre-feet (74,000,000 m^{3}). Soon after the United States entered World War II, the majority of enrollees left the camp to enlist, and it was closed in 1942.

=== Tule Lake Isolation Center ===
The CCC's Camp Tulelake became a War Relocation Authority (WRA) Isolation Center (a prison like that of Moab, UT and Leupp, AZ) in February 1943. It was approximately 10 miles from the Tule Lake War Relocation Center, which was one of 10 WRA concentration camps built in 1942 to incarcerate Japanese Americans evicted from their homes on the West Coast. In March 1943, over 100 men from the Tule Lake Concentration Camp were arrested and housed at the hastily created WRA Isolation Center after they had protested their unjust incarceration by refusing to answer, or answering "no—no," to the Army's and WRA's two clumsily worded questions on the loyalty questionnaire. While imprisoned at the maximum-security camp, inmates completed around $2,500 in repairs to the abandoned buildings, including installing new stove pipes, and repairing the sewer and electrical systems. After several months, they were either released back to the Tule Lake Segregation Center or transferred to other facilities run by the Justice Department or the U.S. Army.

During July 1943, Tule Lake became the only WRA concentration camp to be converted to a Segregation Center used to punish inmates who refused to cooperate with the War Relocation Authority's (WRA) demand they answer a confusing and ill-conceived loyalty questionnaire or who were active in resisting camp authorities. "Of all the wartime incarceration sites, Tule Lake tells the most extreme story of the government's abuse of power against people who dared to speak out against the injustice of their incarceration," said Barbara Takei, whose mother was incarcerated at the Tule Lake concentration camp during World War II.

The WRA also used the WRA Tule Lake Isolation Center as a shelter for 243 Japanese-American inmates brought in from other concentration camps as strikebreakers, to undermine the hundreds of Tule Lake prisoners who refused to harvest crops, seeking to leverage their demands for safer working conditions. The strikebreakers were brought in to harvest the local crops and were paid significantly higher wages than what Tule Lake inmates could earn. For their safety, they were housed at the WRA's Tule Lake Isolation Center to protect them from angry protesters.

Since 1994, following the United States government's formal apology for injustices in 1988 and payment in 1988 and 1992 of reparations to survivors of all the camps, the Tule Lake Committee has sponsored the annual Tule Lake Pilgrimage. It has advocated for preservation of the entire Tule Lake site, both the Tule Lake War Segregation Center and Camp Tulelake. In December 2008, both sites were designated as part of the Tule Lake Unit, World War II Valor in the Pacific National Monument.

==== Frank Tanabe ====
A notable inmate was Frank Tanabe, who volunteered to serve in a mostly Japanese-American military unit, interrogating Japanese prisoners in India and China. When asked why he served in the same army that imprisoned him, Tanabe replied, "I wanted to do my part to prove that I was not an enemy alien, or that none of us were — that we were true Americans. And if we ever got the chance, we would do our best to serve our country. And we did." During the 2012 Presidential race, Tanabe who was then 93 and on his deathbed, gained wide publicity for having his daughter fill out his last ballot. He received mostly positive reaction for his patriotism. Tanabe died on October 24, 2012. His family declined to announce which candidate he voted for.

==== Italian and German POWs ====
With so many local farmers and workers participating in the military during World War II, the Tulelake Growers Association petitioned the US Government for prisoners of war to help with the harvest. In May 1944 the federal government sent 150 Italian POWs to the area. US officials converted Camp Tulelake to accommodate additional German POWs who were transferred from Camp White (near Medford, Oregon) the following month. They set up fences, barbed wire, latrines, water lines, guard towers, and search lights around the camp.

At its peak in October 1944, the camp housed 800 German POWs who were able to travel freely in the area, a privilege not bestowed on the American citizens of Japanese descent who were imprisoned in the camps. They helped plant, tend, and harvest onion and potato crops. The POWs lived and worked in the Tule Lake area until the camp closed in 1946. Although some of the POWs applied for the lottery of local homesteads in order to stay in the area, none gained a homestead.

== Proposed airport fencing ==
In 2012 Modoc County, California officials applied for a grant from the Federal Aviation Administration (FAA) to fund a new 8 feet (2.4 m) tall and 3 miles (4.8 km) long fence around the nearby Tulelake Municipal Airport, to keep animals off the runway. The Tule Lake Committee and related groups working to preserve the historical integrity of the former Tule Lake War Relocation Center and related Camp Tulelake have opposed the airport fence. It would surround the site of most of the prison's barracks — nearly 46 complete "blocks" and portions of several others — impeding visitors and desecrating the physical and spiritual integrity of the camp. The Stop the Fence at Tulelake Airport organization has explained, "A fence will prevent all Americans from experiencing the dimension and magnitude of the concentration camp where people experienced mass exclusion and racial hatred."

The opponents note that being excluded from the area would especially affect former internees and their descendants, who make regular pilgrimages to the former incarceration site and their specific assigned barracks. Those who make the pilgrimage want the ability to walk throughout the massive camp and imagine the experiences of the internees. "They want to traverse the site to experience the dimension and magnitude of the place, to gain a sense of the distances family members walked in their daily routine to eat meals, attend school, to do laundry and use the latrines. They want to summon up the ghosts of the place, to revive long-suppressed memories and to mourn personal and collective loss."

Actor George Takei, held as a child with his family at the concentration camp, has worked in support of the petition against the fence. Takei has said, "We must not permit this history to be erased and minimized by destroying the integrity of the site or making it inaccessible to future generations."

== See also ==
- California during World War II
