= James Otsuka =

Nisei Japanese American Quaker and conscientious objector (1921–1984)

Katsuki James Otsuka (January 22, 1921 – May 25, 1984) was a Nisei Japanese American Quaker who was jailed as a conscientious objector during World War II, and later became a war tax resister.

During World War II, after the signing of Executive Order 9066, Otsuka was interned at the Tule Lake War Relocation Center. Otsuka was classified by the draft board as a conscientious objector subject to "noncombatant service in the armed forces", but he was unwilling to participate in the armed forces in any capacity and argued, unsuccessfully, that he should have been classified as a conscientious objector subject to "civilian work of national importance." Unable to change his classification, and unwilling to serve in the armed forces, he surrendered to the New York District Attorney and pleaded guilty to a violation of the draft law and sentenced to three years in prison. (Note: "During World War II plaintiff Otsuka, a Quaker, was classified 1A-O, i.e., a conscientious objector subject to noncombatant service in the armed forces of the United States. By reason of his religious training and belief, however, he felt he could not perform military service of any kind and should have been classified 4E, i.e., a conscientious objector subject to civilian work of national importance. He informed his draft board of his decision and refused to report for induction, surrendering himself instead at the office of the New York District Attorney. Upon his plea of guilty he was convicted of a violation of the Selective Service and Training Act of 1940 (former 50 U.S.C. App. § 311), and was sentenced by the federal district court to three years in the penitentiary. He served his term of imprisonment and was duly released." —Otsuka v. Hite (KATSUKI JAMES OTSUKA et al., Plaintiffs and Appellants, v. BENJAMIN S. HITE, as Registrar of Voters, etc., Defendant and Respondents, 64 C2d 596 (May 24, 1966).)

Otsuka testified:

[I]n an extreme emergency such as war does bring, I feel the obligation to assist in any way possible in a civilian program under civilian direction that would help to alleviate human suffering and to promote greater human happiness, I was willing to participate in a civilian program of rehabilitation assisting in wartorn ravaged areas or in a medical research program, but that was never allowed by my draft board.… As a general rule I obey the law. I feel that it is my duty to violate the law when it involves my conscience, such as a law requiring racial segregation, or commanding me to enter the armed forces and kill human beings. When I refuse to obey the law I do not do so lightly or casually. It takes all of my faith and courage.

Again imprisoned in 1949, this time for not paying $4.50 in taxes as a war protest, he stayed in prison a month longer than his 4-month sentence because he refused to pay his fine.

Two months after his release, on August 5, 1950 (one day before the fifth anniversary of the dropping of the atomic bomb on Hiroshima), he was arrested with two other protesters for passing out leaflets at the Y-12 nuclear weapons facility in Oak Ridge, Tennessee. These leaflets read, in part:

I have come to Oak Ridge... to dramatize to my fellow citizens that our tax money is being used in large part for the destruction of the world. At 10:45 on an August morning in 1945 the first atomic bomb was used for human destruction. I came today to burn, at that hour, 70% of a dollar bill, symbolizing the percentage of taxes that, according to our President, Harry Truman, is being used for military preparation and for fighting the "Cold War."

== See also ==
- Conscientious objection to military taxation
- Conscription in the United States
