= Mary Koga =

Mary Koga (née Mary Hisako Ishii, August 10, 1920 – June 8, 2001) was a Japanese-American photographer and social worker in Chicago.

== Life ==
Koga was born in Sacramento, California, on August 10, 1920, and had been an avid photographer since she was a child. She concentrated on social work, however, and received a BA in 1942 from the University of California at Berkeley and a Master's degree in 1947 from the University of Chicago School of Social Service Administration. During World War II, following the signing of Executive Order 9066, she was incarcerated in the internment camp at Tule Lake for a year because of her Japanese ethnicity.

From 1947 to 1969, she worked in the field of social work in Chicago, starting out as a case worker and eventually teaching as an Assistant Professor for Field Work at the University of Chicago, School of Social Service Administration, 1960–1969.

Koga then concentrated on photography, studied at the IIT Institute of Design and received a MFA from the School of the Art Institute of Chicago in 1973. She then went on to teach photography at Columbia College Chicago for seven years.

Mary Koga died in Chicago on June 8, 2001.

== Photography ==
Koga's photographic work consists mainly of three distinct series.

The Floral Forms series was begun in 1972 and went on into the 1990s. Done in both color as well as black and white, the images are delicate close-ups of mostly single flower heads, artfully arranged in the studio with tightly controlled lighting. On occasion, she over exposed and used multiple exposure to emphasise the structure and/or color. Comparison has been made with the flower paintings of Georgia O'Keeffe.

In parallel, between 1972 and 1980, Koga went to rural Alberta to work on the series The Hutterites. Her images show the members of the isolated religious community of Hutterites, who in many cases had been photographed for the first time.

Koga's third big project, Portrait of the Issei in Illinois, consisted of images of the elderly first generation of Japanese immigrants, her parents' generation, in black and white as well as color photos. Between 1986 and 1989, Koga photographed them in the day care facility and the Senior Citizens Work Center of the Japanese American Service Committee (JASC) and at Heiwa Terrace, a Japanese American senior residence, both located in Chicago.
