= Hana Shimozumi =

American singer

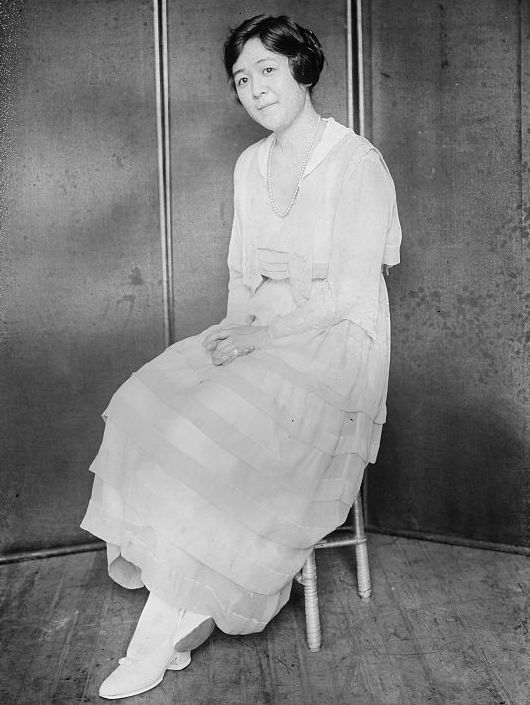
- Born: 22 October 1893; Honolulu
- Died: 12 July 1978 (aged 84)
- Occupation: Singer
- Spouse: George Iki

Hana Shimozumi (October 22, 1893 — July 12, 1978), sometimes written as Hannah Shimozumi, and later Hana Shimozumi Iki, was an American singer, billed as "the Japanese Nightingale", best known for playing Yum Yum in Gilbert and Sullivan's The Mikado in 1919.

== Early life ==
Hana Shimozumi was born in Honolulu, Hawaii. She was raised by adoptive parents in San Francisco, California.

== Career ==
Hana Shimozumi was billed as "the Japanese Nightingale". She first gained wider attention when she sang an aria from Madame Butterfly at a movie house in San Francisco in 1918; her performance was called "a real novelty" by one report, which went on to explain that Shimozumi was "like a little Japanese doll". The New York Times also called her 1919 performance as Yum Yum in The Mikado with the Gallo English Opera Company a "novelty". She was said to be the first woman of Japanese ancestry to play the role. Another reviewer went beyond the novelty, to describer her voice as "a pure, sweet, light, flexible soprano", further noting that "she is also a vivacious and intelligent actress."

After she married, Shimozumi Iki left the light opera stage "temporarily", but continued to perform on radio, and in revues, through the 1920s.

== Personal life ==
Hana Shimozumi married George S. Iki, a surgeon. They had a daughter, Marsha, born in 1922, and lived in Sacramento, California and later in Los Angeles, California. During World War II, following the signing of Executive Order 9066, Hana Shimozumi Iki was interned, with her family, at Tule Lake Relocation Center. She had visited Japan only once as a child, and did not speak, read, or write Japanese. Hannah Shimozumi Iki died in 1978, aged 84 years.
