= Tulelake Basin Joint Unified School District =

School district in California

Address
- 400 G Street Tulelake, California, 96134; United States

District information
- Type: Public
- Grades: K–12
- NCES District ID: 0639940

Students and staff
- Students: 407 (2020–2021)
- Teachers: 23.39 (FTE)
- Staff: 23.75 (FTE)
- Student–teacher ratio: 17.4:1

Other information
- Website: www.tulelakeschools.org

Tulelake Basin Joint Unified School District is a school district in California, United States. There are three schools in the district, all of which are in the town of Tulelake, in Siskiyou County.

In Siskiyou County, the district includes Tulelake. A portion of the district resides in Modoc County. There, the district includes Newell.

The school district is served by Modoc County Office of Education. Kindergarten through sixth grades are taught at Tulelake Elementary, where the mascot is the Gosling, a reflection of area waterfowl. Tulelake High School, located in the town of Tulelake, instructs grades seven through twelve, and its mascot is the Honker, a slang term for the Canada goose. Tulelake Continuation School merged with the high school in 2018.

== Schools ==
- Tulelake Elementary School (K-6)
- Tulelake High School (7-12)
