= Violet Kazue de Cristoforo =

American writer (1917–2007)

- Born: Kazue Yamane; September 3, 1917; Nīnole, Hawaii, U.S.
- Died: October 3, 2007 (aged 90); Salinas, California, U.S.
- Occupations: Poet, editor
- Notable work: "Poetic Reflections of the Tule Lake Internment Camp, 1944" and "May Sky: There Is Always Tomorrow; An Anthology of Japanese American Concentration Camp Kaiko Haiku"

Violet Kazue de Cristoforo (September 3, 1917 – October 3, 2007) was a Japanese American poet, composer and translator of haiku. Her haiku reflected the time that she and her family spent in detention in Japanese internment camps during World War II. She wrote more than a dozen books of poetry during her lifetime. Her best known works are Poetic Reflections of the Tule Lake Internment Camp, 1944, which was written nearly 50 years after her detention and May Sky: There Is Always Tomorrow; An Anthology of Japanese American Concentration Camp Kaiko Haiku, for which she was the editor.

She was a major advocate for redress for Japanese Americans who were held in internment camps during the war. The work of Cristoforo and other activists ultimately led the United States government to make reparations and issue an official apology to the 120,000 Japanese Americans who were incarcerated during World War II.

== Early life ==
de Cristoforo was born Kazue Yamane in Ninole, Hawaii. It was a common practice for Japanese immigrants to send their children to Japan to study and spend time with relatives, and at age eight de Cristoforo was sent to Hiroshima for her primary education. She returned to the United States at thirteen, rejoining her family at their new home in Fresno, California. After graduating from high school in Fresno, she married her first husband, Shigeru Matsuda. The couple ran a Japanese bookstore and joined a haiku club in the area. By the start of World War II, de Cristoforo had established herself as a well-known poet in the kaiko style, a modernist, freestyle subgenre of haiku.

== World War II ==
About a month after the December 7, 1941 attack on Pearl Harbor, President Franklin Roosevelt authorized the exclusion of Japanese Americans from the West Coast with Executive Order 9066. By the time the Matsudas were "evacuated" from their Fresno home in April 1942, the couple had two small children and de Cristoforo was pregnant with a third — and recovering from surgery to remove a tumor. The family was taken to the Fresno Assembly Center, one of fifteen temporary detention sites where Japanese Americans were held while construction on the more permanent and isolated War Relocation Authority camps was completed. There, she gave birth to her third child, in 100-degree heat and on a makeshift table made of orange crates in an "apartment" converted from a horse stall. Soon after, the family was transported to the concentration camp at Jerome, Arkansas, where they remained until the infamous "loyalty questionnaire" resulted in Matsuda's separation from de Cristoforo and their children.

The War Relocation Authority had mandated all adults in camp to apply for leave clearance in 1943, regardless of whether they had requested leave or not. Initiated in order to relieve overpopulation in the camps and get an early start on post-war resettlement, the leave registration process eventually devolved into a tool to assess inmate loyalty and segregate dissidents and other "troublemakers." Anger and confusion in response to the questionnaire were widespread, mostly directed at two questions that asked Japanese Americans to volunteer for military service (despite their earlier eviction at the hands of the army) and renounce their allegiance to Japan (despite the fact that most had never held such allegiance). Matsuda refused to respond to the two questions, and encouraged de Cristoforo to do the same; following her husband's advice, she answered only that she wished to be repatriated to Japan with her family. Matsuda, already in custody after joining a committee to investigate food shortages in Jerome, was transferred to the Justice Department internment camp at Santa Fe, New Mexico, while de Cristoforo and their three children were sent to the Tule Lake Segregation Center in northern California.

Throughout her time in camp, de Cristoforo continued to write, publishing some of her haiku in camp newspapers and literary magazines. Her time in camp left a lasting imprint on her writings. Much of the original haiku that were written during her years in the camps has been lost or destroyed, however, her surviving writings and later work reflected the desolation and despair that she felt during that period.

== Post World War II ==
de Cristoforo and her children were expatriated to Japan in 1946, her husband having been transported there earlier. Upon arriving in Japan, de Cristoforo discovered that her husband had remarried to a Japanese woman. She also witnessed firsthand the destruction of the atomic bomb and its effects on Japanese civilians when she went to Hiroshima to find her mother. She later described the reunion in an interview, recalling that when she found her mother wandering in the hills outside the city, the severe burns the woman had suffered in the bombing made her "look like a monster."

She spent several years in post-war Japan, during which time she met her second husband, Wilfred H. de Cristoforo, an Army officer with the occupation forces. The couple moved back to the United States in 1956 and settled in Monterey, California. In addition to her writing, de Cristoforo took a publishing job at the McGraw-Hill Companies, and over the years she published a total of six books and anthologies of poetry. She played an active role in the redress movement of the 1970s and 1980s, and testified in one of the hearings of the Commission on Wartime Relocation and Internment of Civilians, whose recommendations ultimately led to the passage of the landmark Civil Liberties Act of 1988. Her marriage to Wilfred lasted until his death in 1998.

== Honors ==
Violet Kazue de Cristoforo was honored in Washington D.C. by the National Endowment for the Arts in September 2007, just before her death. The NEA awarded her a National Heritage Fellowship for cultural achievement for her writings. The National Heritage Fellowship Award is the highest award given in the United States to honor achievement in traditional and folk arts.

== Death ==
Violet Kazue de Cristoforo died from complications from a stroke on October 3, 2007, at her home in Salinas, California. She died just two weeks after receiving the National Heritage Fellowship Award. She was 90 years old.

Cristoforo was survived by two daughters, a son, and two grandchildren.
