= Renunciation Act of 1944 =

- Long title: An Act to provide for the loss of United States nationality under certain circumstances
- Nicknames: Renunciation Act of 1944
- Enacted by: the 78th United States Congress

Citations
- Public law: 78-405
- Statutes at Large: 58 Stat. 677

Codification
- Acts amended: Nationality Act of 1940
- Titles amended: Title 8
- U.S.C. sections created: 8 U.S.C. § 801(i) (now 8 U.S.C. § 1481(a)(6))

Legislative history
- Introduced in the House as H.R. 4103 by A. Leonard Allen (D–LA) on February 1, 1944; Committee consideration by House Committee on Immigration and Naturalization; Passed the House on February 23, 1944 (111–33); Passed the Senate on June 23, 1944 (vote totals not recorded); Signed into law by President Franklin D. Roosevelt on July 1, 1944

The Renunciation Act of 1944 (Public Law 78-405, 58 Stat. 677) was an act of the 78th Congress regarding the renunciation of United States citizenship. Prior to the law's passage, it was not possible to lose U.S. citizenship while in U.S. territory except by conviction for treason; the Renunciation Act allowed people physically present in the U.S. to renounce citizenship when the country was in a state of war by making an application to the Attorney General. The intention of the 1944 Act was to encourage Japanese American internees to renounce citizenship so that they could be deported to Japan.

After the end of World War II, those who wanted their U.S. citizenship restored were generally successful at arguing before federal courts that their renunciations pursuant to the 1944 Act had been made under duress and were therefore invalid. The law remained in effect but received little further attention until the 2000s, when a prisoner interested in renouncing U.S. citizenship won a ruling from a federal court that the U.S. was indeed in a "state of war" at the time for purposes of the 1944 Act. Other prisoners sought to renounce citizenship under the 1944 Act but could not fulfill an administrative requirement that they appear in person at a United States Citizenship and Immigration Services office for an interview — a requirement whose legality was upheld twice by federal courts — or that they depart from the United States immediately after having their renunciation application approved. A 2013 immigration reform bill contained provisions to repeal the 1944 Act.

== Overview ==
The Renunciation Act of 1944 has no official short title; its long title was "A bill to provide for the loss of United States nationality under certain circumstances". Another unofficial name for it is the Denationalization Act of 1944. It is also officially referred to as the Act of July 1, 1944, a name it shares with the Public Health Service Act. It added the following item to the list of actions in Nationality Act of 1940 § 401 (8 U.S.C. § 801) which would result in loss of nationality by a United States citizen or non-citizen national:

making in the United States a formal written renunciation of nationality in such form as may be prescribed by, and before such officer as may be designated by, the Attorney General, whenever the United States shall be in a state of war and the Attorney General shall approve such renunciation as not contrary to the interests of national defense.

Due to immigration law reforms and the removal of other items from the list of actions causing loss of nationality, the exact subsection number of this provision has changed over the years. It appeared in the Immigration and Nationality Act of 1952 at § 349(a)(7). The Immigration and Nationality Act of 1965 did not alter § 349 at all. It currently stands at INA § 349(a)(6) (8 U.S.C. § 1481(a)(6)).

== Legislative history ==
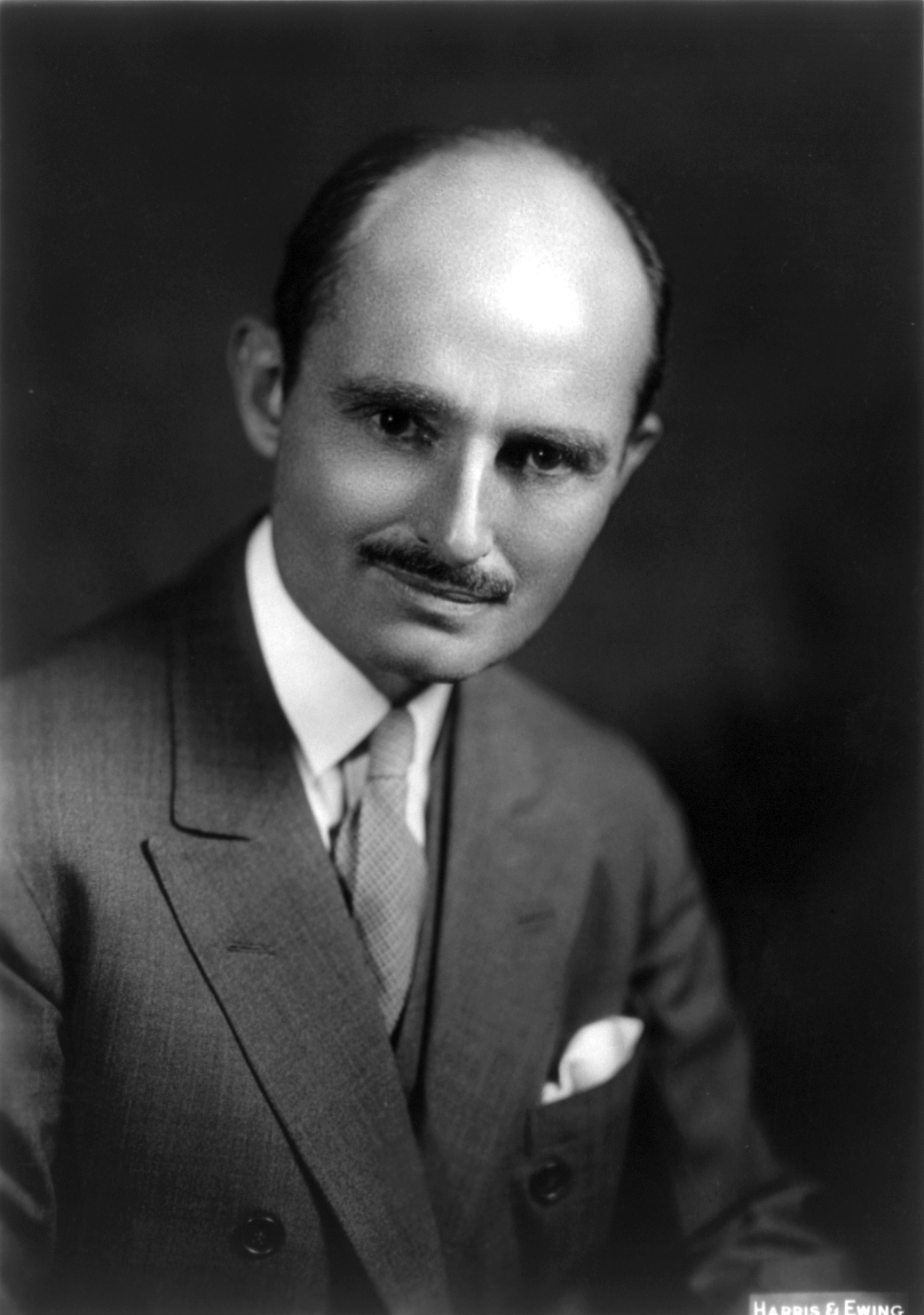
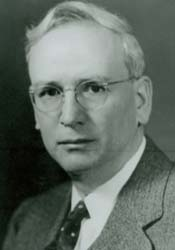
Attorney General Francis Biddle (left) drafted the bill, and Louisiana Representative A. Leonard Allen (right) introduced it in the House.

Under the Nationality Act of 1940 as it stood originally, renunciation of citizenship could only be performed before a United States diplomatic officer overseas. In December 1943, Martin Dies, Jr. (D-TX) asked Attorney General Francis Biddle to appear before the House Un-American Activities Committee to testify on the handling of internees seeking to depart from the United States for Japan; Biddle recommended amending the 1940 Act to permit loss of nationality by persons on U.S. soil. Biddle and the Department of Justice drafted a bill to that effect and were significantly involved in efforts to lobby Congress for support. Edward Ennis of the Department of Justice estimated that between one and three thousand Japanese Americans would renounce citizenship under the law's provisions. Ennis saw the bill as crucial to the DOJ's efforts to retain custody of Japanese Americans suspected of disloyalty; he feared that the courts would find continued internment of U.S. citizens to be unconstitutional, and hoped that "militants" among Japanese American internees would voluntarily renounce citizenship under the bill's provisions, in which case the DOJ could continue to detain them until they could be deported to Japan. A. Leonard Allen (D-LA) introduced the bill on February 1, 1944. It was referred to the House Committee on Immigration and Naturalization, which unanimously reported the bill two days later.

Allen first spoke about the bill on the House floor on February 8; he described it as "a bill to expatriate certain Japanese nationals ... who have openly avowed their disloyalty to the United States and have disclaimed loyalty to the United States, although they were born in this country". There was further debate on the bill on February 16. A number of West Coast representatives criticized it as insufficiently far-reaching for its failure to consider alleged renunciations of citizenship prior to the bill's enactment. J. Leroy Johnson (R-CA) thus moved an amendment to the bill to allow the Attorney General to consider all statements of renunciation of citizenship as far back as October 1940. In support, Clair Engle (D-CA) pointed to the refusal of 5,376 internees to "swear unqualified allegiance to the United States and renounce Japan" as an example of the type of alleged renunciations of citizenship which the original bill failed to consider, while Bertrand W. Gearhart (R-CA) noted that many internees who had earlier expressed enthusiasm for Japan were less vocal due to the defeats the country had suffered in battle and urged that their statements not go unpunished. The previous week, Gearhart had also introduced a bill which would strip Japanese Americans of citizenship unless they swore an oath of allegiance to the United States in a court of naturalization within 60 days after the date of his bill's passage rejecting the divinity of the Emperor of Japan and the "divine mission" of the "Yamato race". He stated that "I am convinced that the method I propose, constitutional in all of its aspects, will reveal a large number of Japanese who are earnestly hoping for our defeat, secretly doing everything they can to insure a victory for our despicable foes."

However, Samuel Dickstein (D-NY), chairman of the House immigration committee, opposed Johnson's amendment, stating that Congress had no authority to revoke the citizenship of birthright citizens. Earl C. Michener (R-MI) warned of the potential for abuse, saying that "if the amendment were adopted, it would mean that anybody who at any time said anything which might be construed as unpatriotic could be brought in." Bill sponsor A. Leonard Allen (D-LA) and Richard F. Harless (D-AZ) also spoke out against the amendment, sympathizing with the motivations of the amendment's proponents while stating that it was probably unconstitutional. In the end, Johnson's amendment was defeated by a narrow margin.

The bill itself in its original form passed the House on February 23. The Senate Committee on Immigration reported the bill without amendment on June 22. Rufus C. Holman (R-OR) initially objected, suggesting that the bill should be amended to insert the word "voluntarily", but Wallace H. White, Jr. (R-ME) pointed out to him that the Nationality Act of 1940 already required that any action specified as causing loss of nationality would only have that effect if it were undertaken voluntarily, and Holman withdrew his objection. White brought the bill up for consideration on June 23, stating that "[t]he reason I have asked to have the bill considered at this time is that we are hopeful that a number of Japanese will take advantage of the procedure outlined in the bill so that we may offer them to the Imperial Government of Japan in exchange for American citizens who are now being held", and the bill passed that day. After the bill passed the Senate, President Franklin D. Roosevelt signed it into law on July 1.

== World War II renunciations ==
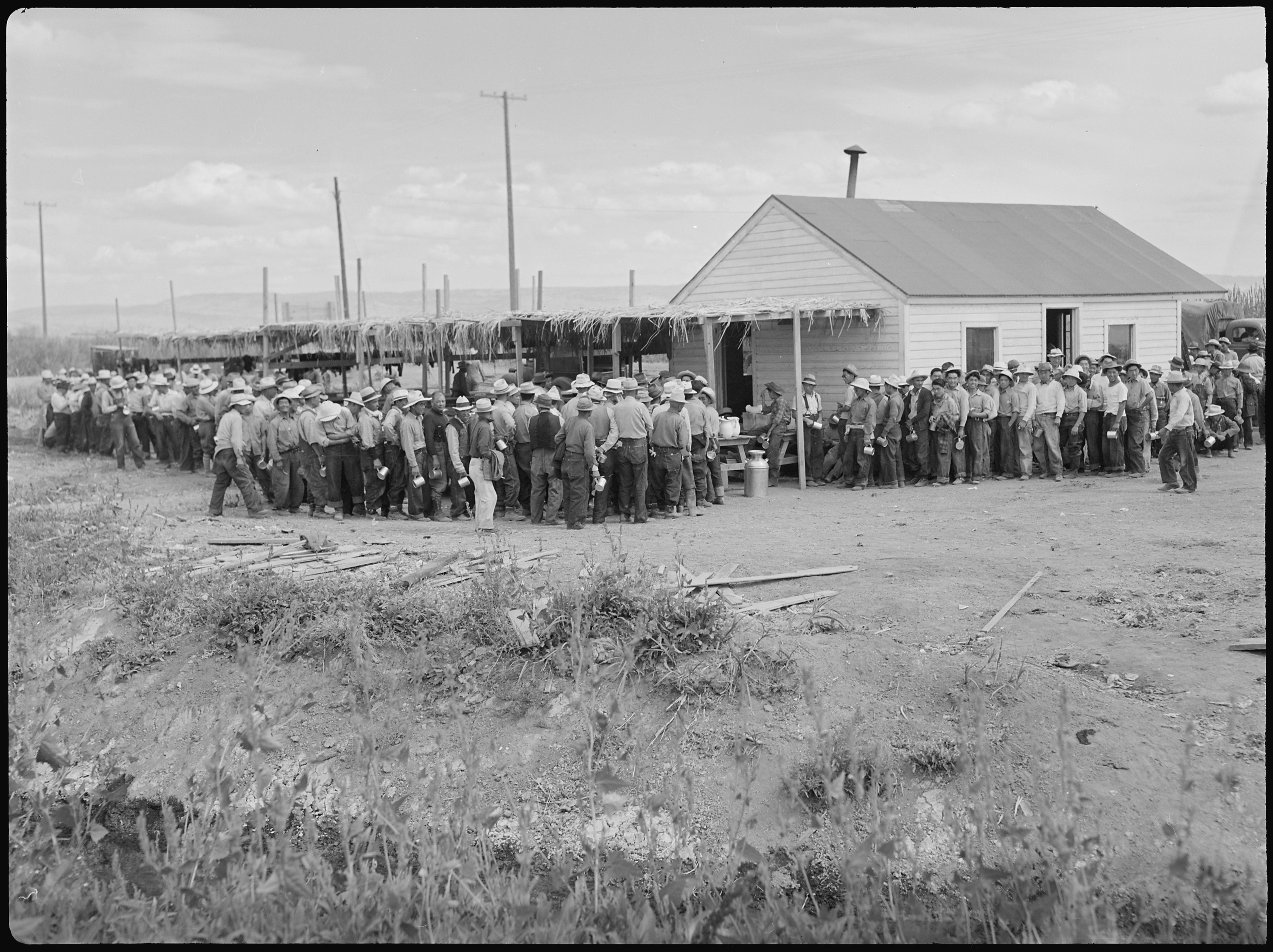
The vast majority of renunciants came from the Tule Lake internment camp (pictured).

Biddle and the Department of Justice began implementing procedures under the Act in October 1944. Each internee seeking to renounce citizenship would have to fill out a standard application form identifying him or herself and signing a statement that "I fully understand that if permitted to renounce my United States nationality I will divest myself of all rights and privileges thereunto pertaining". This application would be followed by an administrative hearing to determine whether or not Biddle should grant approval in his capacity as Attorney General. Each renunciant whose application was successful would receive a "Notice of Approval of Renunciation" as proof.

Many renunciants would later face stigmatization in the Japanese American community, during and after the war, for having made that choice, although at the time they were not certain what their futures held were they to remain American and remain interned. These renunciations of American citizenship have been highly controversial, for a number of reasons. Some apologists for internment have cited the renunciations as evidence that "disloyalty" or anti-Americanism was well represented among the interned peoples, thereby justifying the internment. Many historians have dismissed the latter argument, for its failure to consider that the small number of individuals in question were in the midst of persecution by their own government at the time of the "renunciation":

[T]he renunciations had little to do with "loyalty" or "disloyalty" to the United States, but were instead the result of a series of complex conditions and factors that were beyond the control of those involved. Prior to discarding citizenship, most or all of the renunciants had experienced the following misfortunes: forced removal from homes; loss of jobs; government and public assumption of disloyalty to the land of their birth based on race alone; and incarceration in a "segregation center" for "disloyal" ISSEI or NISEI...

Minoru Kiyota, who was among those who renounced his citizenship and swiftly came to regret the decision, has stated that he wanted only "to express my fury toward the government of the United States," for his internment and for the mental and physical duress, as well as the intimidation, he was made to face.

[M]y renunciation had been an expression of momentary emotional defiance in reaction to years of persecution suffered by myself and other Japanese Americans and, in particular, to the degrading interrogation by the FBI agent at Topaz and being terrorized by the guards and gangs at Tule Lake.

San Francisco attorney Wayne M. Collins helped many people who had renounced citizenship under the provisions of the 1944 Act to have the government's recognition of their renunciations reversed. On Independence Day in 1967, the Department of Justice promulgated regulations which would make it unnecessary for renunciants to resort to the courts; they could instead fill out a standard form to request an administrative determination of the validity of their earlier renunciations. However, not all renunciants sought to regain their citizenship; Joseph Kurihara, for example, chose instead to accept repatriation to Japan, and lived out the rest of his life there.

== Later case law ==
=== Definition of "state of war" ===
Later case law on the Renunciation Act of 1944 focused on the meaning of the term "state of war". Congress passed a joint resolution that July 25, 1947, "shall be deemed to be the date of the termination of any state of war heretofore declared by the Congress and of the national emergencies proclaimed by the President on September 8, 1939, and on May 27, 1941", in the interpretation of a large number of statutes, including the Renunciation Act of 1944.

The executive branch interpreted "state of war" to exclude the Vietnam War. The Immigration and Naturalization Service wrote that "It has also been determined that, for purposes of current section 349(a)(7), the United States has not been in a state war during the period of the Viet Nam hostilities, and is not now in a state of war by reason of that conflict. Accordingly, any attempt to renounce citizenship within the United States under the current provision, based upon the Viet Nam conflict, should be regarded as ineffectual." In an obiter dictum in a 1970 Board of Immigration Appeals decision on the deportation case against Thomas Jolley, a North Carolina man who renounced U.S. citizenship in Toronto but later returned to the United States, Anthony Montaquila noted that "[t]he Immigration and Naturalization Service receives communications from persons in the United States imprisoned for crime who wish to renounce their citizenship, and those who wish to avoid military service. ... However, there are no procedures in the present laws as was the case involving Japanese renunciants during World War II."

In 2004, James Kaufman, a Wisconsin prisoner, attempted to use the Renunciation Act of 1944 to renounce his U.S. citizenship. When his application was ignored, he filed a pro se suit in the United States District Court for the District of Columbia, which ruled against him. Kaufman's legal battles would go on for several years, and in 2008 he made another attempt to renounce his citizenship under the same law. He appealed to the Court of Appeals for the D.C. Circuit, where Judges Judith W. Rogers, A. Raymond Randolph and Harry T. Edwards remanded Kaufman's case to the District Court for another hearing, writing that "we do not understand the government to suggest that a congressionally created right can be nullified by government inaction". In 2010, Judge Richard W. Roberts ruled that the U.S. was indeed in a state of war in both 2004 and 2008, rejecting assertions by the Department of Justice that the law was ambiguous and that the DOJ should be permitted to interpret the term "state of war" as it saw fit in administering the statute. The DOJ appealed Roberts' ruling to the D.C. Circuit Court. However, attorneys for the Department of Justice abandoned the appeal in August 2010, while declining to make public comment on their reasons for that decision.

=== Requirement to renounce in person ===
In various instances in 2011, other U.S. citizens serving prison sentences enquired with United States Citizenship and Immigration Services (USCIS) about renouncing their U.S. citizenship under the Renunciation Act of 1944. USCIS responded that they would have to appear in person at a designated USCIS office for an interview, a requirement which they could not fulfill due to their imprisonment, and that until the interview USCIS would hold their applications in abeyance. Two filed separate suits in the District Court for the District of Columbia.

==== Sluss v. USCIS ====
One pro se case, Sluss v. United States Citizenship and Immigration Services, came before Judge Ellen Segal Huvelle in 2012. Plaintiff Matthew David Sluss argued that the requirement to appear at a USCIS office in person violated the Administrative Procedure Act (APA) because that requirement did not appear anywhere in the text of the Renunciation Act of 1944. Huvelle disagreed, writing in her memorandum opinion that "the statute requires the agency to assess the voluntariness of an applicant’s renouncement without stating how such an assessment should occur", and thus found that no APA violation had occurred.

==== Schnitzler v. United States ====
In another case, Schnitzler v. United States, plaintiff Aaron Schnitzler first appeared pro se, but later gained representation. In the initial District Court case, Judge Reggie Walton construed Schnitzler's filing as a motion for a writ of mandamus against USCIS compelling them to process his application for renunciation, as well as a declaration that the Renunciation Act of 1944 was unconstitutional. Walton declined to grant relief, writing in his memorandum opinion that Schnitzler lacked standing to challenge the constitutionality of the statute and that USCIS had already acted on his application; with regards to Schnitzler's right to renounce his citizenship, Walton quoted the Supreme Court case Hewitt v. Helms, where it was stated that "[l]awful incarceration brings about the necessary withdrawal or limitation of many privileges and rights, a retraction justified by the considerations underlying our penal system."

Represented by students in Georgetown University Law Center's Appellate Litigation Program, in 2014 Schnitzler challenged Walton's decision in the Court of Appeals for the DC Circuit, before Chief Judge Merrick B. Garland and Circuit Judges Robert L. Wilkins and Douglas H. Ginsburg. The ruling first disagreed that Schnitzler lacked standing to challenge the renunciation statutes, stating that as he remained a citizen against his wishes, he had grounds to seek redress against what he viewed as an injury. The ruling further criticized the lower court for construing Schnitzler's filings as a motion for a writ of mandamus and concluding that USCIS' response meant he had obtained the relief he sought, and for stating that Schnitzler had no standing to challenge USCIS' policy either. Garland noted that the government "offered a blizzard of constantly changing explanations for why it could not process [Schnitzler]'s request", and in the end USCIS did not actually inform Schnitzler of the in-person interview policy before he filed his initial challenge in the District Court (a letter informing Schnitlzer of the policy did not get mailed out). Schnitzler's case was remanded to the District Court for further proceedings.

=== Requirement to depart from the United States after renunciation ===
In a separate instance in 2012, Alan Horowitz, a dual citizen of the United States and Israel, also inquired with USCIS about renouncing U.S. citizenship under the Renunciation Act of 1944. USCIS responded that he must attend an interview at a USCIS office and demonstrate that he met all of the legal requirements to renounce his citizenship, in particular that he had the "ability and intention to depart the [United States] immediately upon having [his] renunciation request granted." Horowitz had just been released from a New York state prison, but the New York Attorney General directed, pursuant to the state's Mental Hygiene Law, that Horowitz either remain in custody of the Department of Corrections and Community Supervision (DOCCS) pending further proceedings or be committed to a custodial treatment facility. The New York Supreme Court granted Horowitz' motion for an order directing DOCCS to produce him at a USCIS office for the in-person interview. However, he failed to actually secure the right to depart from the United States: the court rejected his argument that differing treatment of alien and dual-citizen offenders — in particular, the fact that an alien in his circumstances would be deported after completion of sentence, whereas citizens faced barriers to leaving — violated his right to equal protection and substantive due process. Horowitz appealed, but in 2014 the New York Court of Appeals affirmed the lower court's ruling.

== Proposed repeal ==
Section 3713 of the Border Security, Economic Opportunity, and Immigration Modernization Act of 2013 would repeal 8 U.S.C. § 1481(a)(6), under the rubric of "preventing criminals from renouncing citizenship during wartime". This provision was contained in the initial version of the bill sponsored by the Gang of Eight, and remained in the version that passed the Senate on June 27, 2013. The same provision was also contained in the version of the bill introduced in the House on October 2, 2013, by Joe Garcia and 180 co-sponsors.
