= Tionesta, California =

Unincorporated community in California, United States

Tionesta
- Unincorporated community
- Location in California Tionesta (the United States)
- Coordinates: 41°38′46″N 121°19′41″W
- Country: United States
- State: California
- County: Modoc
- Elevation: 4,278 ft (1,304 m)

Tionesta is an unincorporated community in Modoc County, California, United States. It is located on the former Great Northern Railway Bieber Line, 2 miles (3.2 km) northwest of Timber Mountain, at an elevation of 4278 feet (1304 m).

Tionesta has feature ID 1660004 in the U.S. Geological Survey, National Geographic Names database. The latitude and longitude for the development are 41°38′46″N 121°19′41″W on the Perez 7.5-minute quadrangle. The area is part of ZIP Code 96134, which includes other nearby locales such as Tulelake, Newell, and Lava Beds National Monument, and area code 530. The BNSF Railway Gateway Subdivision track runs through this area.

Tionesta is the southern gateway to Lava Beds National Monument. Nearby is the Eagle's Nest R.V. Park for motor home, trailer and tent camping. Next door is the Hawks Nest Cabins & RV Park. Tionesta also provides access to the Medicine Lakes highlands and Glass Mountain. Numerous outdoor activities are available, including camping, hiking, exploring the area and the over 800 caves at Lava Beds. Tule Lake Segregation Center and Captain Jack's Stronghold are two of the many historical attractions also to be found in the surrounding area.

Modoc County Air Pollution Control District records show a facility named PG&E Tionesta Compressor Station, (permit #97-01) located at 41°38′57″N 121°19′06″W on State Route 139. In public filings, the facility is also identified as Compressor Station Number 14B. This is a major geographic feature of the area.

== History ==
The name, which comes from the Tionesta Forest in Pennsylvania, was bestowed by a lumber company executive.

In the year 1942, a mill that caught on fire ended up burning down the entire community.

== Nearby ==
The Tionesta post office, located 2 miles (3.2 km) east of Tionesta, operated from 1939 to 1955.

== Politics ==
In the state legislature, Tionesta is in the 1st Senate District, represented by Republican Dave Cox, and in the 2nd Assembly District, represented by Republican Jim Nielsen.

Federally, Tionesta is in California's 1st congressional district, represented by Republican James Gallagher.
