= Newell, California =

Newell
- census-designated place
- Location in California Newell (the United States)
- Coordinates: 41°53′18″N 121°22′20″W
- Country: United States
- State: California
- County: Modoc

Area
  - Total: 2.413 sq mi (6.249 km^{2})
  - Land: 2.407 sq mi (6.234 km^{2})
  - Water: 0.0058 sq mi (0.015 km^{2}) 0.24%
- Elevation: 4,042 ft (1,232 m)

Population (2020)
  - Total: 301
  - Density: 125/sq mi (48.3/km^{2})
- Time zone: UTC-8 (Pacific (PST))
  - Summer (DST): UTC-7 (PDT)
- ZIP Code: 96134
- Area codes: 530, 837
- GNIS feature IDs: 1659219; 2583091

Newell is a census-designated place in Modoc County, California, United States. It is located 50 miles (80 km) west-northwest of Alturas, at an elevation of 4,042 feet (1,232 m). Its population is 301 as of the 2020 census, down from 449 from the 2010 census.

The community is located along State Route 139, south of Tulelake and approximately 10 miles (16 km) south of the Oregon border. It is less than 8 miles (13 km) south of Tulelake on the U.S. Geological Survey 7.5-minute quadrangle, Newell, California. The U.S. Geological Survey, National Geographic Names Database, calls its existence official with a feature ID of 1659219 and lists the coordinates of the community as 41°53′18″N 121°22′20″W. The ZIP Code is 96134: a code shared with several other local towns. The community is served by area code 530.

== History ==
The town was named in honor of Frederick Haynes Newell, director of the United States Reclamation Service.

== Geography ==
According to the United States Census Bureau, the CDP covers an area of 2.4 square miles (6.2 km^{2}), of which 99.76% is land, and 0.24% is water.

== Demographics ==
Historical population
Census	Pop.	Note	%±
2010	449		—
2020	301		−33.0%
U.S. Decennial Census; 1850–1870 1880-1890; 1900 1910 1920; 1930 1940 1950; 1960 1970 1980; 1990 2000 2010

Newell first appeared as a census designated place in the 2010 U.S. census.

The 2020 United States census reported that Newell had a population of 301. The population density was 125.1 inhabitants per square mile (48.3/km^{2}). The racial makeup of Newell was 128 (42.5%) White, 2 (0.7%) African American, 20 (6.6%) Native American, 0 (0.0%) Asian, 0 (0.0%) Pacific Islander, 103 (34.2%) from other races, and 48 (15.9%) from two or more races. Hispanic or Latino of any race were 181 persons (60.1%).

The census reported that 281 people (93.4% of the population) lived in households, 20 (6.6%) lived in non-institutionalized group quarters, and no one was institutionalized.

There were 108 households, out of which 44 (40.7%) had children under the age of 18 living in them, 52 (48.1%) were married-couple households, 8 (7.4%) were cohabiting couple households, 22 (20.4%) had a female householder with no partner present, and 26 (24.1%) had a male householder with no partner present. 21 households (19.4%) were one person, and 7 (6.5%) were one person aged 65 or older. The average household size was 2.6. There were 78 families (72.2% of all households).

The age distribution was 77 people (25.6%) under the age of 18, 15 people (5.0%) aged 18 to 24, 55 people (18.3%) aged 25 to 44, 90 people (29.9%) aged 45 to 64, and 64 people (21.3%) who were 65 years of age or older. The median age was 45.9 years. For every 100 females, there were 106.2 males.

There were 135 housing units at an average density of 56.1 units per square mile (21.7 units/km^{2}), of which 108 (80.0%) were occupied. Of these, 72 (66.7%) were owner-occupied, and 36 (33.3%) were occupied by renters.

== Politics ==
In the state legislature, Newell is in the 1st senatorial district, represented by Republican Megan Dahle, and the 1st Assembly district, represented by Republican Heather Hadwick.

Federally, Newell is in California's 1st congressional district, represented by Republican James Gallagher.

== Migrant centers ==
=== Newell Migrant Center ===
In 1972, 47 cabins were built at the migrant center. Most of the cabins were compact: 448 square feet with two small bedrooms, a kitchen, bathroom, and small living room. Three of the units, however, were duplexes, each containing two 725-square-foot, three-bedroom units. In 2006, Modoc County began construction on new units after demolishing the 44 old, smaller cabins. The new facilities consist of ten 600-square-foot, two-bedroom units and twenty-four 725-square-foot, three-bedroom units similar to those in the old duplexes, which were retained. The camp provides a table, chairs, refrigerator, stoves, sink, beds and mattresses. A daily fee includes electricity, water, trash pickup, and landscaping. The facility has a resource center, a playground, a laundry facility, and a public services program.

=== Castlerock Farmworker Center ===
The Castlerock Farmworker Center opened in the spring of 2020. This center is for domestic, foreign, or H2A farm labor without families. There are 47 units with a laundry facility in the center; each unit can house 3 individuals. The units are rented to businesses needing housing for their farm labor.

=== Sierra Cascade ===
In 2006, Modoc County's largest grower, Sierra Cascade, was sued by laborers brought to California from Mexico via the H2A contract labor program over poor housing and living conditions. The H2A program requires growers to provide housing to workers. Sierra Cascade housed their workers in a warehouse on the county fairgrounds. One former worker recalls the grim conditions, “During the first two weeks, on many occasions, we would have a cup of coffee for breakfast, a small portion of greasy tough meat with rice for lunch, and cereal, coffee and bread with jelly for dinner.” In the warehouse, couples and single men and women alike were all held openly together, despite promises of family quarters. The workers were tasked with trimming the roots of strawberry seedlings. Their contracts specified they’d be required to process upwards of 1,000 plants per hour. If a worker failed to meet their quota, Sierra Cascade would fire them and put them on a bus back to Mexico. Some workers still failed to meet their quota despite working through their breaks. A state court judge later ruled that the production quotas were legal.

== Transportation ==
Tulelake Municipal Airport is in the CDP.

== Landmarks ==
- There are many grain and horseradish storage facilities in or near Newell.
- Newell Elementary School, operated by Tulelake Basin Joint Unified School District, is a local landmark.
- Tulelake Municipal Airport (FAA identifier: 081 or zero-eight-one) features a 3,500-foot (1,100 m) paved runway. The Common Traffic Advisory Frequency is 122.9 MHz.
- The site of the World War II U.S. Army facility named the Tule Lake War Relocation Center is near the north end of the community. The center was a prison camp for interned Japanese nationals, and U.S. citizens of Japanese ancestry, during a portion of the war.
- The Union Pacific Railroad Modoc Subdivision tracks run along the west side of town and parallel to SR139.
- Tulelake National Wildlife Refuge, a unit of Klamath National Wildlife Refuge, is northwest of the town. This is a U.S. Department of the Interior, U.S. Fish and Wildlife Service federal reservation.

== Education ==
Tulelake Basin Joint Unified School District is the local school district.

== See also ==
- Japanese American internment
- Lava Beds National Monument
- Tule Lake War Relocation Center
- Tionesta, California
- Tulelake, California

== Sources ==
- Map: Lava Beds National Monument, California, 417-648/40240 (Washington, D.C.: Government Printing Office, 1997).
- U.S. Geological Survey, National Geographic Names Database.
- Map: U.S. Geological Survey, Newell, California, 7.5-minute Quadrangle, 1993.
- California Region Timetable: 14, (Modesto, California: Altamont Press, 2003).
