= Tulelake, California =

City in California, United States

- City
- City of Tulelake
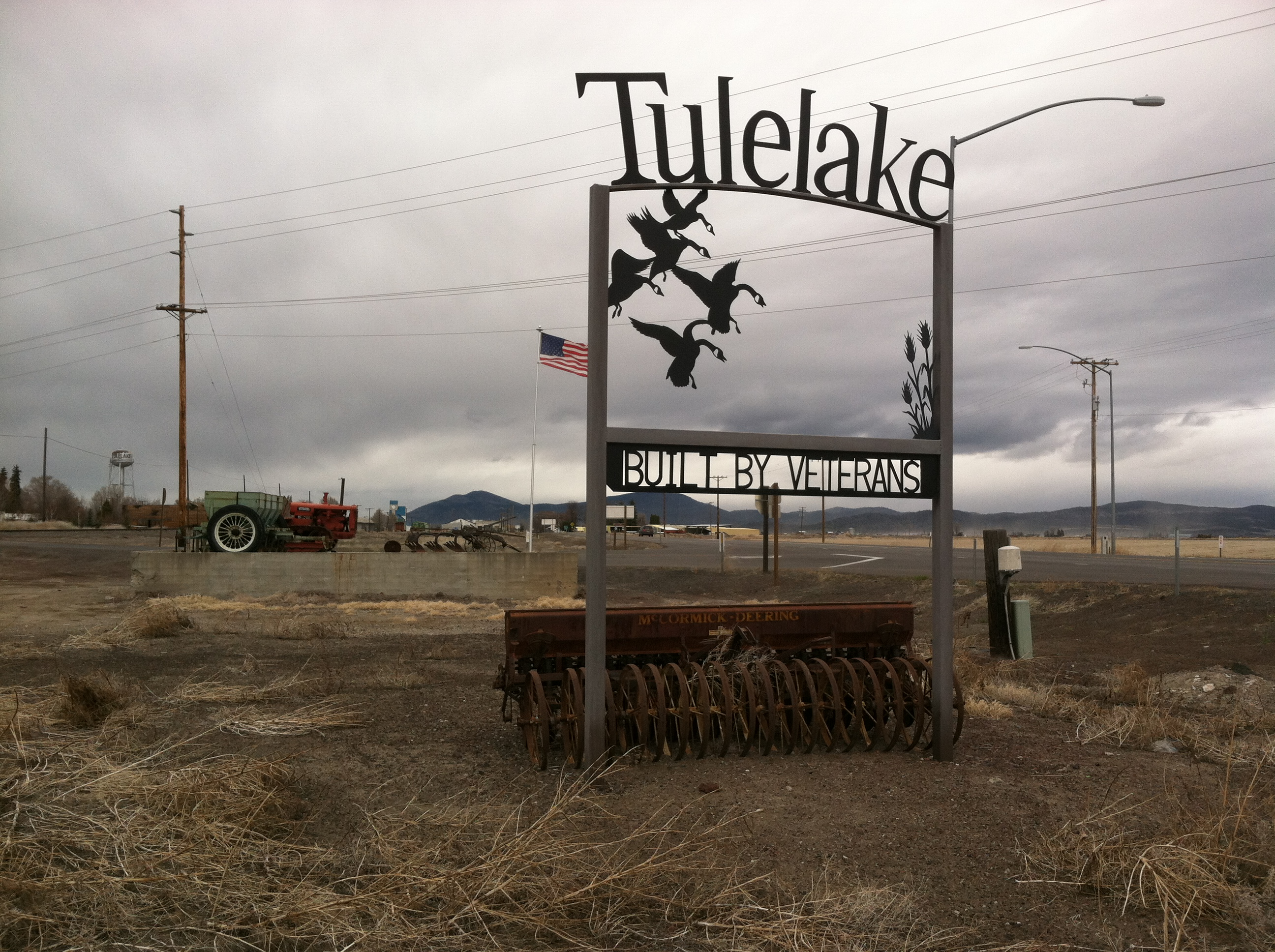
- Welcome sign, south Tulelake
- Interactive map of Tulelake, California
- Location in the United States
- Coordinates: 41°57′15″N 121°28′33″W
- Country: United States
- State: California
- County: Siskiyou
- Incorporated: March 1, 1937

Area
  - Total: 0.41 sq mi (1.07 km^{2})
  - Land: 0.41 sq mi (1.06 km^{2})
  - Water: 0.0039 sq mi (0.01 km^{2}) 0.58%
- Elevation: 4,040 ft (1,230 m)

Population (2023)
  - Total: 857
  - Density: 2,090/sq mi (808/km^{2})
- Time zone: UTC-8 (Pacific (PST))
  - Summer (DST): UTC-7 (PDT)
- ZIP code: 96134
- Area code: 530
- FIPS code: 06-80686
- GNIS feature ID: 1660040
- Website: www.cityoftulelake.com

Tulelake (/ˈtuːlileɪk/ TOO-lee-layk) is a city in northeastern Siskiyou County, California, United States. The town is named after nearby Tule Lake. Its population is 857 as of the 2023 census, down from 902 in the 2020 census.

Tulelake peace officers are authorized by state law, along with cooperation of the state of Oregon, to serve as and be recognized as peace officers within Malin, Oregon, along with the inverse being true for peace officers employed within Malin, wherein they are recognized as peace officers within Tulelake by the California Penal Code.

== History ==
The first public auction of Tulelake land parcels took place on April 15, 1931. Over 100 lots were sold for prices ranging from $65 to $350. In 1937, the city was incorporated. Today there are over 400 housing units.

Two World War II internment camps were located near Tulelake. Camp Tulelake was an Italian and German prisoner-of-war camp to the west of town, located on Hill Road along Sheepy Ridge. Also referred to as Gillems Bluff, Sheepy Ridge is a small range adjacent to Tule Lake. The other internment camp housed nearly 18,000 Japanese Americans and Japanese alien residents and was in operation from May 1942 to March 1946. The Tule Lake War Relocation Center was one of ten Japanese internment camps in the United States. It was located approximately seven miles southeast of Tulelake. Today the western portion of the camp is occupied by the townsite of Newell.

Nightfire Island, an archeological site over 5,000 years old, is west of Tule Lake along the shores of Indian Tom Lake.

== Geography ==
Tulelake is located near the Siskiyou-Modoc County line, at the northwestern corner of the Great Basin and Range.

According to the United States Census Bureau, the city has a total area of 0.4 square miles (1.0 km^{2}), of which 99.42% is land and 0.58% is water.

=== Climate ===
Tulelake has a steppe climate (BSk) according to the Köppen climate classification system.

Climate data for Tulelake, California (1991–2020 normals, extremes 1932–present)
Month	Jan	Feb	Mar	Apr	May	Jun	Jul	Aug	Sep	Oct	Nov	Dec	Year
Record high °F (°C)	64 (18)	70 (21)	77 (25)	84 (29)	95 (35)	103 (39)	102 (39)	102 (39)	102 (39)	90 (32)	75 (24)	68 (20)	103 (39)
Mean daily maximum °F (°C)	42.4 (5.8)	47.2 (8.4)	53.4 (11.9)	59.2 (15.1)	68.9 (20.5)	76.8 (24.9)	86.3 (30.2)	85.5 (29.7)	79.0 (26.1)	65.8 (18.8)	49.8 (9.9)	40.8 (4.9)	62.9 (17.2)
Daily mean °F (°C)	31.9 (−0.1)	34.9 (1.6)	39.6 (4.2)	44.4 (6.9)	53.0 (11.7)	59.5 (15.3)	66.8 (19.3)	65.0 (18.3)	58.4 (14.7)	48.1 (8.9)	37.4 (3.0)	30.5 (−0.8)	47.5 (8.6)
Mean daily minimum °F (°C)	21.4 (−5.9)	22.5 (−5.3)	25.8 (−3.4)	29.6 (−1.3)	37.1 (2.8)	42.2 (5.7)	47.2 (8.4)	44.4 (6.9)	37.8 (3.2)	30.3 (−0.9)	25.0 (−3.9)	20.2 (−6.6)	32.0 (0.0)
Record low °F (°C)	−28 (−33)	−24 (−31)	−2 (−19)	6 (−14)	16 (−9)	23 (−5)	29 (−2)	24 (−4)	17 (−8)	7 (−14)	−10 (−23)	−27 (−33)	−28 (−33)
Average precipitation inches (mm)	1.32 (34)	1.14 (29)	1.20 (30)	0.99 (25)	1.11 (28)	0.80 (20)	0.21 (5.3)	0.25 (6.4)	0.37 (9.4)	0.72 (18)	1.14 (29)	1.45 (37)	10.70 (272)
Average snowfall inches (cm)	6.2 (16)	4.0 (10)	2.8 (7.1)	1.6 (4.1)	0.1 (0.25)	0.0 (0.0)	0.0 (0.0)	0.0 (0.0)	0.0 (0.0)	0.1 (0.25)	3.0 (7.6)	5.0 (13)	22.8 (58)
Average precipitation days (≥ 0.01 in)	14.7	11.2	13.0	10.7	9.2	5.0	2.0	2.1	2.8	6.0	11.8	13.2	101.7
Average snowy days (≥ 0.1 in)	4.5	3.0	2.4	1.4	0.1	0.0	0.0	0.0	0.0	0.2	1.7	3.3	16.6
Source: NOAA

== Demographics ==
Historical population
Census	Pop.	Note	%±
1940	785		—
1950	1,028		31.0%
1960	950		−7.6%
1970	857		−9.8%
1980	783		−8.6%
1990	1,010		29.0%
2000	1,020		1.0%
2010	1,010		−1.0%
2020	902		−10.7%
U.S. Decennial Census; 1860–1870 1880-1890; 1900 1910 1920; 1930 1940 1950; 1960 1970 1980; 1990 2000 2010

=== 2020 ===
The 2020 United States census reported that Tulelake had a population of 902. The population density was 2,200.0 inhabitants per square mile (849.4/km^{2}). The racial makeup of Tulelake was 251 (27.8%) White, 2 (0.2%) African American, 15 (1.7%) Native American, 3 (0.3%) Asian, 1 (0.1%) Pacific Islander, 329 (36.5%) from other races, and 301 (33.4%) from two or more races. Hispanic or Latino of any race were 677 persons (75.1%).

The whole population lived in households. There were 283 households, out of which 144 (50.9%) had children under the age of 18 living in them, 148 (52.3%) were married-couple households, 25 (8.8%) were cohabiting couple households, 61 (21.6%) had a female householder with no partner present, and 49 (17.3%) had a male householder with no partner present. 45 households (15.9%) were one person, and 25 (8.8%) were one person aged 65 or older. The average household size was 3.19. There were 220 families (77.7% of all households).

The age distribution was 309 people (34.3%) under the age of 18, 81 people (9.0%) aged 18 to 24, 224 people (24.8%) aged 25 to 44, 185 people (20.5%) aged 45 to 64, and 103 people (11.4%) who were 65 years of age or older. The median age was 30.2 years. For every 100 females, there were 102.7 males.

There were 361 housing units at an average density of 880.5 units per square mile (340.0 units/km^{2}), of which 283 (78.4%) were occupied. Of these, 162 (57.2%) were owner-occupied, and 121 (42.8%) were occupied by renters.

=== 2010 ===
The 2010 United States census reported that Tulelake had a population of 1,010. The population density was 2,450.5 inhabitants per square mile (946.1/km^{2}). The racial makeup of Tulelake was 563 (55.7%) White, 1 (0.1%) African American, 15 (1.5%) Native American, 1 (0.1%) Asian, 0 (0.0%) Pacific Islander, 365 (36.1%) from other races, and 65 (6.4%) from two or more races. Hispanic or Latino of any race were 601 persons (59.5%).

The Census reported that 1,010 people (100% of the population) lived in households, 0 (0%) lived in non-institutionalized group quarters, and 0 (0%) were institutionalized.

There were 347 households, out of which 158 (45.5%) had children under the age of 18 living in them, 177 (51.0%) were opposite-sex married couples living together, 43 (12.4%) had a female householder with no husband present, 20 (5.8%) had a male householder with no wife present. There were 24 (6.9%) unmarried opposite-sex partnerships, and 0 (0%) same-sex married couples or partnerships. 93 households (26.8%) were made up of individuals, and 43 (12.4%) had someone living alone who was 65 years of age or older. The average household size was 2.91. There were 240 families (69.2% of all households); the average family size was 3.58.

The population was spread out, with 340 people (33.7%) under the age of 18, 102 people (10.1%) aged 18 to 24, 244 people (24.2%) aged 25 to 44, 222 people (22.0%) aged 45 to 64, and 102 people (10.1%) who were 65 years of age or older. The median age was 29.4 years. For every 100 females, there were 102.4 males. For every 100 females age 18 and over, there were 100.0 males.

There were 437 housing units at an average density of 1,060.3 per square mile (409.4/km^{2}), of which 173 (49.9%) were owner-occupied, and 174 (50.1%) were occupied by renters. The homeowner vacancy rate was 6.0%; the rental vacancy rate was 12.1%. 473 people (46.8% of the population) lived in owner-occupied housing units and 537 people (53.2%) lived in rental housing units.

=== 2000 ===
As of the census of 2000, the median income for a household in the city was $23,750, and the median income for a family was $27,750. Males had a median income of $28,088 versus $22,500 for females. The per capita income for the city was $10,244. About 33.7% of families and 34.6% of the population were below the poverty line, including 46.2% of those under age 18 and none of those age 65 or over.

== Government ==
In the state legislature Tulelake is in the 1st senatorial district, represented by Republican Megan Dahle, and the 1st Assembly district, represented by Republican Heather Hadwick.

Federally, Tulelake is in California's 1st congressional district, represented by Republican James Gallagher.

== Education ==
There are two schools in the Tulelake Basin Joint Unified School District, preschool through sixth grades are taught at Tulelake Elementary, where the mascot is the Gosling, a reflection of area waterfowl. Tulelake High School, located in the town of Tulelake, instructs grades seven through twelve, and its mascot is the Honker, a slang term for the Canada goose.

== Infrastructure ==
Tulelake has a municipal airport.

== In popular culture ==
Tulelake is featured by Huell Howser in California's Gold Episode 204.

A goose and duck processing business and pillow factory in Tulelake was featured on an episode of Discovery Channel's series Dirty Jobs.

Mark Twain nicknamed his two-year-old girl Modoc due to her tantrums in reference to an incident in 1852 near Tule Lake where the Modoc destroyed an entire wagon train.
