= Tulelake Municipal Airport =

- IATA: none; ICAO: none; FAA LID: O81

Summary
- Airport type: Public
- Operator: City of Tulelake
- Location: Newell, California
- Elevation AMSL: 4,044 ft / 1,232.6 m
- Coordinates: 41°53′15″N 121°21′34″W
- Interactive map of Tulelake Municipal Airport

Runways
Direction	Length		Surface
Direction	ft	m	Surface
11/29	3,577	1,090	Asphalt

Tulelake Municipal Airport (FAA LID: O81) is a public airport in Newell, Modoc County, California. seven miles (11 km) southeast of the city of Tulelake, it serves the Modoc and Siskiyou County area. This general aviation airport covers 358 acres (145 ha) and has one paved runway. Primary users are crop dusting and general aviation pilots. There is no scheduled service to Tulelake Muni, and the airport is unattended, with no control tower.

== History ==
The airport is located on the site of the Tule Lake War Relocation Center, a concentration camp used during the Japanese American internment. Tule Lake housed some 29,000 men, women and children between 1942 and 1945, and the foundations or supports of many camp buildings are visible from the air by pilots in the landing pattern.

Following the dismantling of most barracks and other structures, the wide, hard-packed main firebreak and a smaller firebreak road were put to use as runways. The smaller runway was eventually abandoned, with the main runway (11/29) being paved and remaining in use.

Following an announcement by the Federal Aviation Administration of plans to erect a fence around the airport, groups concerned with the historical nature of the area organized support and a petition drive to prevent this action. The planned fence would surround the site of most of the barracks - nearly 46 complete "blocks" and portions of several others - thus making it difficult for visitors to tour the historic site. This will especially impact pilgrimages of former internees, who visit the locations of their former homes.
