= Joseph Kurihara =

Joseph Yoshisuke Kurihara (Japanese: 栗原 吉輔, 1895–1965) was a Japanese American internee at Manzanar and then Tule Lake who renounced U.S. citizenship under the Renunciation Act of 1944 in protest of the internment. After the end of World War II, he emigrated to Japan, where he lived until his death.

== Biography ==
=== Early life ===
Born on the island of Kauai in the Republic of Hawaii to father Kichizo and mother Haru, both sugar plantation workers, Kurihara moved to the mainland to attend St. Ignatius High School in San Francisco. Following service with the U.S. Army Medical Department in France during World War I, Kurihara went on to Southwestern University in Los Angeles, where he received a bachelor's degree in commercial science. Afterwards he held a variety of jobs in food-related business, until the 1930s when he became the navigator on a Portuguese ship.

=== Internment ===
During World War II, following the signing of Executive Order 9066, Kurihara was interned at the Manzanar War Relocation Center. In December 1942, Kurihara was part of a five-member committee which organized protests over the arrest of Harry Ueno, an internee accused of the beating of Fred Tayama. The protestors became unruly, and two soldiers fired on the crowd without orders; two men died, and ten others were injured. Kurihara spent about a month in jail, and was further transferred to citizen isolation camps at Moab, Utah and Leupp, Arizona before finally arriving at the Tule Lake Segregation Center.

=== Renunciation and emigration ===
Kurihara was one of 5,725 Nisei, mostly Tule Lake internees, who renounced U.S. citizenship under the Renunciation Act of 1944, and one of 316 who did not seek to restore their citizenship after the war's end. He departed for Japan in November 1945 on board the USS Randall (APA-224) with 1,500 other former internees. He worked for the United States Army, Japan as a translator in Sasebo, Nagasaki before moving to Tokyo, where he lived until his death.
