= A. Leonard Allen =

American politician (1891–1969)

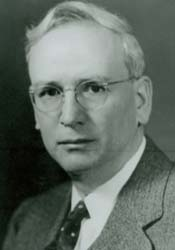

Member of the U.S. House of Representatives from Louisiana's 8th district
- In office January 3, 1937 – January 3, 1953
- Preceded by: Cleveland Dear
- Succeeded by: George S. Long

Personal details
- Born: Asa Leonard Allen; January 5, 1891 Winnfield, Louisiana, U.S.
- Died: January 5, 1969 (aged 78) Winnfield, Louisiana, U.S.
- Party: Democratic
- Spouse: Lottie Mae Thompson
- Children: Harwell L. Allen; Lyndon Blaine Allen
- Education: Louisiana State University

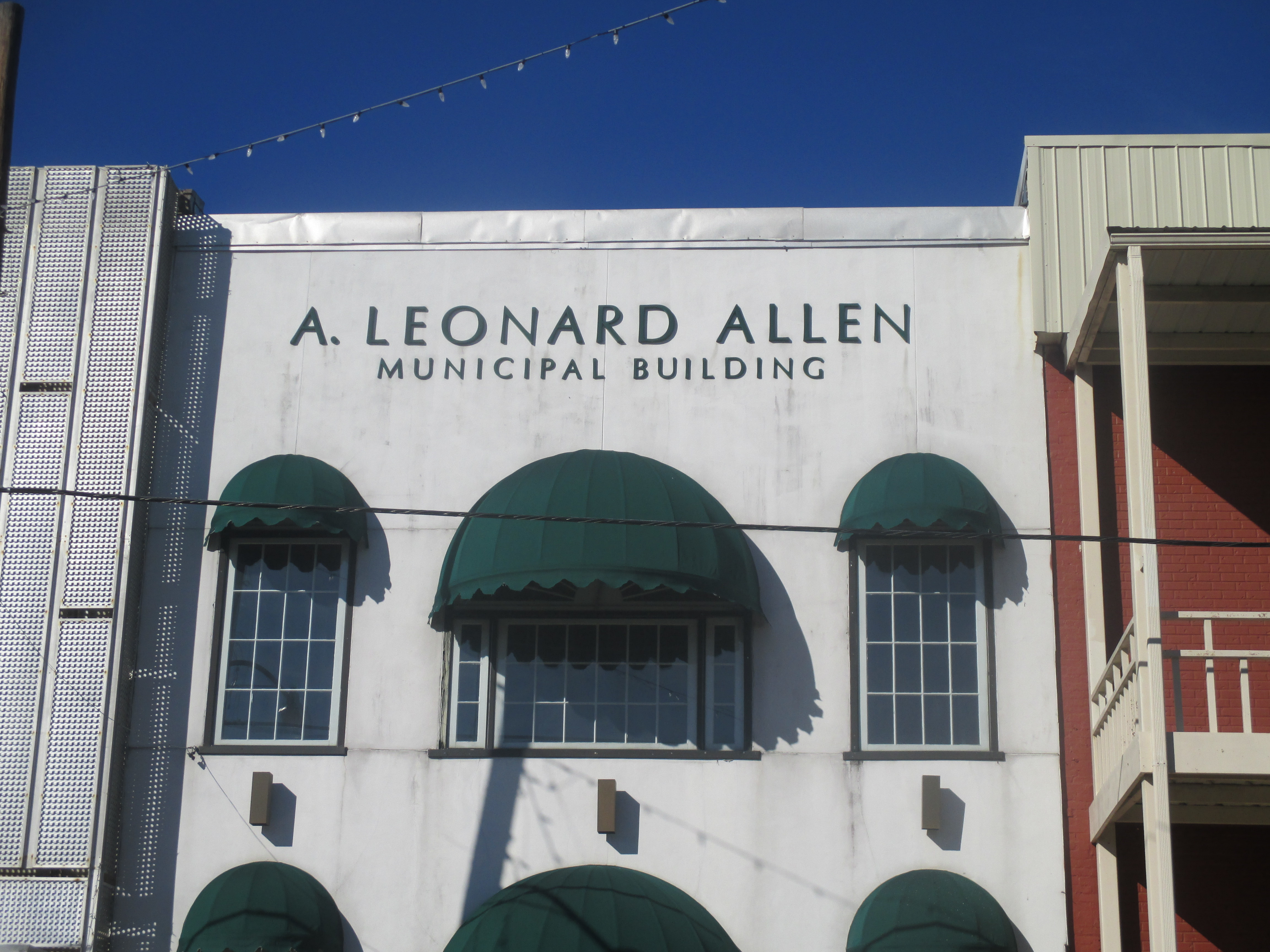
The municipal building in Winnfield is named for Allen.

Asa Leonard Allen (January 5, 1891 – January 5, 1969) was an educator, attorney, and member of the United States House of Representatives from the state of Louisiana. He served eight terms as a Democrat from 1937 to 1953, having represented the now defunct 8th congressional district, centered about Alexandria.

== Early life and career ==
Allen was born in a log cabin near Winnfield, the seat of Winn Parish, to Asa L. Allen and the former Sophronia Perkins. He was a younger brother of Governor Oscar Kelly Allen.

=== Education ===
He was educated in the Winn Parish public schools and received a bachelor's degree from Louisiana State University in Baton Rouge in 1914.

=== Family ===
The next year, he married the former Lottie Mae Thompson, and they had two sons, Harwell L. Allen, who became a district judge, and Lyndon Blaine Allen.

=== Early career ===
Allen taught in the rural schools of neighboring Grant Parish from 1914 to 1917. He was a principal in schools in Georgetown and Verda near Montgomery. Thereafter, he became the superintendent of the Winn Parish system, 1917–1922. He studied law on his own, was admitted to the bar in 1922, and practiced in Winnfield, where he was city attorney for a time.

Allen was a prominent Baptist, who served a stint as vice-president of the Louisiana Baptist Convention. He was a Scottish Rite Mason and a Shriner. He died in Winnfield on his 78th birthday and is interred at Winnfield Cemetery.

== Congress ==
While he first ran for Congress, Allen was also a delegate to the Democratic National Convention in 1936, which renominated the Franklin D. Roosevelt and John Nance Garner ticket, an overwhelming winner in Louisiana and nationwide as well. In Congress, Allen served as chairman of the Committee on the Census. A loyal member of the Long organization, he did not seek a ninth term in Congress in 1952. Instead, he deferred to George Shannon "Doc" Long, the older brother of the legendary Huey Pierce Long Jr., and Earl Kemp Long, who desired to run for Allen's 8th district seat.

In 1943, Allen was among the US representatives who opposed the repeal of the Chinese Exclusion Act. He also introduced the Renunciation Act of 1944 in the House.

== Death and legacy ==
Allen died on his 78th birthday in his native Winnfield, Louisiana.

In 1994, Allen was posthumously inducted into the Louisiana Political Museum and Hall of Fame in Winnfield. His brother had been an original inductee a year earlier.

The municipal building in Winnfield is named in his honor.

U.S. House of Representatives
Preceded by Cleveland Dear (D)	United States Representative for the 8th Congressional District of Louisiana; 1937–1953	Succeeded by George Shannon "Doc" Long (D)
