= Yamato Ichihashi =

Japanese-American economist

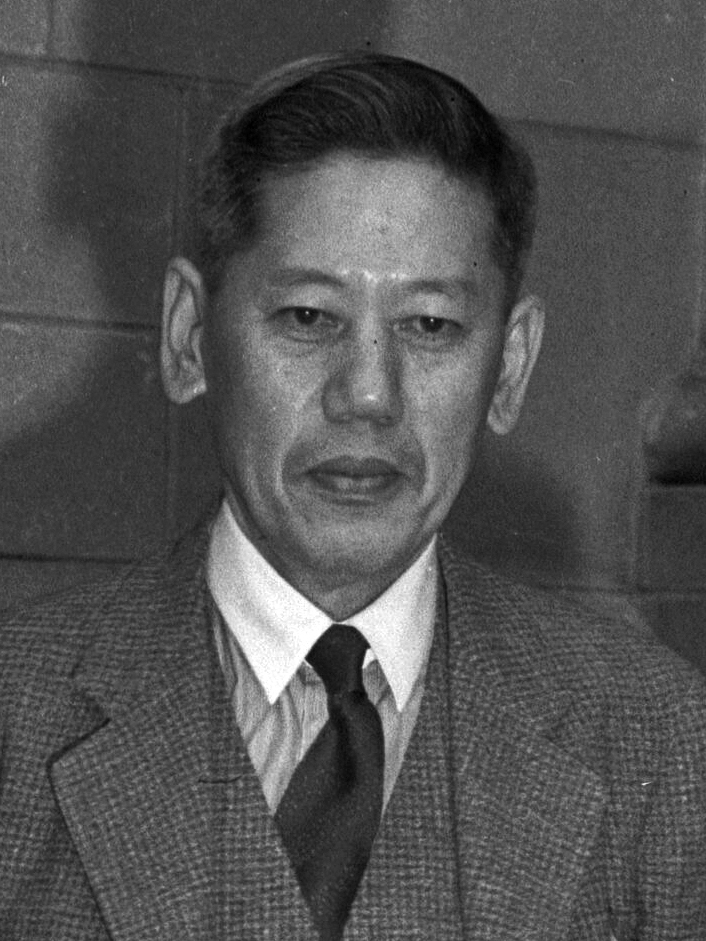
- Yamato Ichihashi, 1935
- Born: April 15, 1878; Nagoya, Japan
- Died: April 5, 1963 (aged 84); California
- Occupations: Economist, college professor

Yamato Ichihashi (Japanese: 市橋 倭, April 15, 1878 – April 5, 1963) was one of the first academics from East Asia in the United States. Ichihashi wrote a comprehensive account of his experiences as an internee at the Tule Lake War Relocation Center, where he was detained during World War II along with other relocated Japanese Americans.

== Early life and education ==
Ichihashi was born in Nagoya, in Aichi prefecture, Japan in 1878. He was the son of Ichihashi Hiromasha, a former samurai, and Maizuno Ai. He moved to the United States in 1894 at the age of 16. He completed public school in San Francisco, graduated from Stanford University with a bachelors and a master's degree in economics, and earned his Ph.D. at Harvard, with a dissertation titled "Emigration in Japan and Japanese Immigration into the State of California". He was a frequent guest speaker at community organizations in San Francisco, during and after his graduate education.

== Career ==
In 1913, Ichihashi began teaching Japanese history and government, international relations, and the Japanese American experience at Stanford. He researched, wrote, and published a classic immigration study, Japanese in the United States (1932). His academic work continued until World War II began.

Ichihashi was upset that Japan started the war, and purchased US war bonds in support of the Americans. Despite this gesture of loyalty, he and his wife, Kei, were uprooted and detained as part of the mass relocation of Japanese Americans during World War II following the signing of Executive Order 9066. Ichihashi and many other relocated people were at first housed in California's Santa Anita racetrack, where they were housed in horse stables, before being relocated to more permanent housing at Sharp Park Detention Center in Pacifica.

== Publications ==
- Japanese Immigration: Its Status in California (1915)
- Washington Conference and After (1928)
- Japanese in the United States (1932)

== Personal life and legacy ==
Ichihashi married and had a son, Woodrow. He died in Stanford, California in 1963, ten days before his 85th birthday. His papers are housed in the special collections of Stanford University's Green Library. In 1999, his unpublished journals from the 1940s were edited by Gordon H. Chang and published as Morning Glory, Evening Shadow: Yamato Ichihashi and His Internment Writings, 1942-1945 by Stanford University Press.
