= George T. Tamura =

American artist (1927–2010)

George T. Tamura (November 27, 1927 – February 11, 2010) was an American artist.

== Early life and education ==
Tamura was born in Sacramento, California. In 1942, soon after the attack on Pearl Harbor (December 7, 1941) and signing of Executive Order 9066, Tamura and his family were incarcerated in the Japanese American incarceration camp, Tule Lake War Relocation Center in Northern California. Tamura was fifteen. While imprisoned in the camp, Tamura painted watercolor landscapes featuring the internment camp as his subject matter. Tamura painted these images on the back of shredded internment notices.

At the end of World War II, in 1945, the Tamura family was released. Tamura attended the Chouinard Art Institute in Los Angeles and showed in numerous one-man shows in that area. He has been employed as an art director for southern and northern California companies.

== Career ==
Tamura continued to practice his art throughout his life. Later in life, he also worked as a public relations and advertisement executive.

In 1995, Tamura wrote an autobiography entitled Reflections, which recounted his experiences being incarcerated during World War II. In 2004, Tamura was featured on the PBS television program History Detectives. A young Taiwanese and Japanese American man, Kenji Liu, was working in the archives of the National Japanese American Historical Society, unknowingly found a box that contained Tamura's paintings. With the History Detectives' help, he discovered that the paintings were indeed those of George T. Tamura.

In 1990, the United States government provided redress to Tamura for his forced incarceration, as well as a letter of apology from the president.
