= Tule Lake War Relocation Center =

National Monument of the United States in California

- U.S. National Register of Historic Places
- U.S. National Historic Landmark
- California Historical Landmark
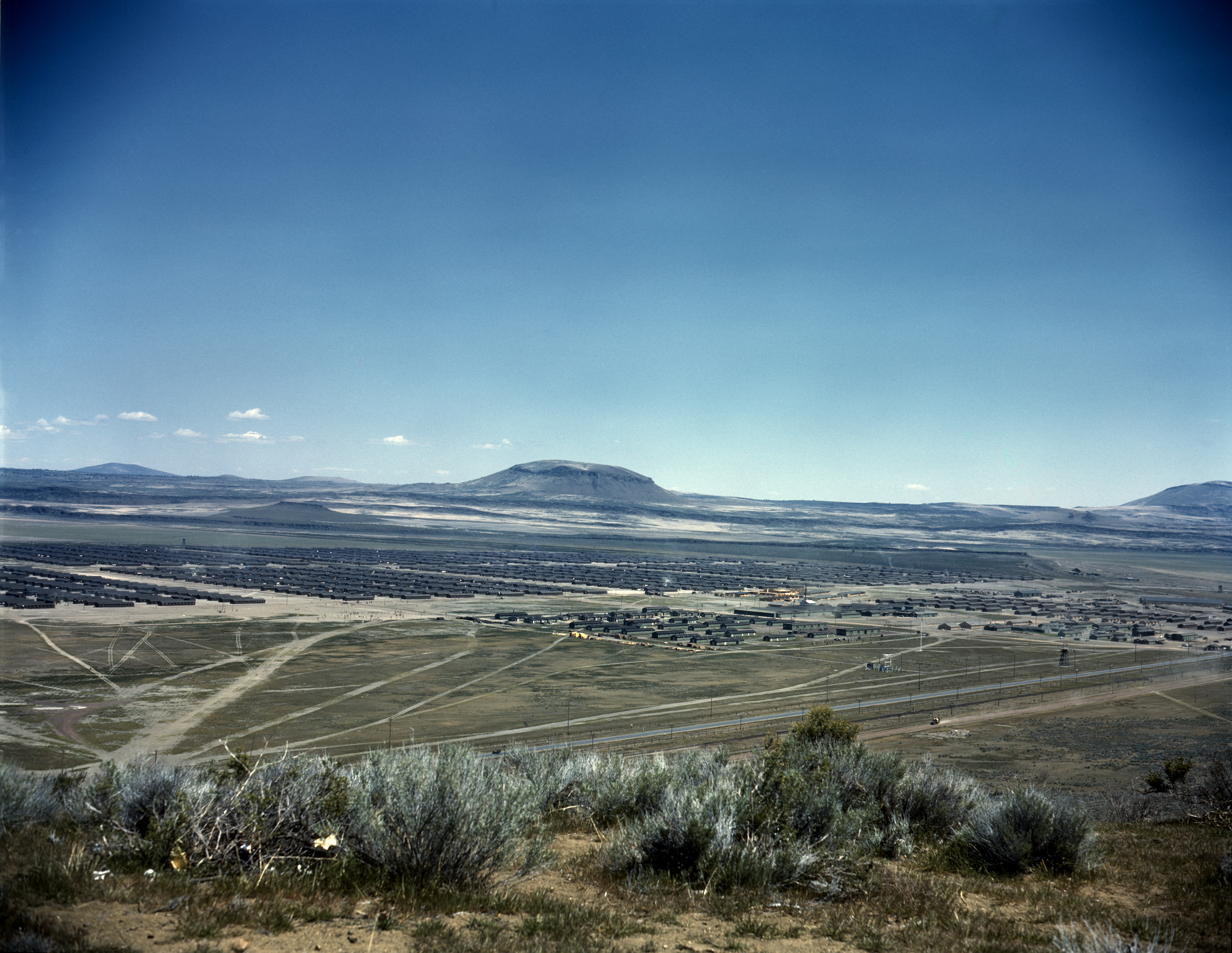
- View of the Tule Lake War Relocation Center photographed by Russell Lee, 1942

- Location within California Location within the United States
- Interactive map of Tule Lake War Relocation Center
- Location: Northeast side CA 139, Newell, California
- Coordinates: 41°53′22″N 121°22′29″W
- Website: Tule Lake National Monument
- NRHP reference No.: 06000210
- CHISL No.: 850-2

Significant dates
- Added to NRHP: February 17, 2006; 20 years ago
- Designated NHL: February 17, 2006

The Tule Lake War Relocation Center, also known as the Tule Lake Segregation Center, was one of ten Japanese American Segregation Centers, located in Modoc and Siskiyou counties in California and constructed in 1942 by the United States government under Franklin D. Roosevelt to incarcerate Japanese-Americans during World War II, forcibly removing them from their homes on the West Coast of the United States. They totaled nearly 120,000 people, more than two-thirds of whom were United States citizens. Among the inmates, the roughly phonetic Japanese notation "Tsurureiko (鶴嶺湖)" was sometimes used in referring to the camp.

After a period of use as the Tule Lake War Relocation Center, this facility was renamed the Tule Lake Segregation Center in 1943 and used as a maximum-security segregation camp to separate and hold those prisoners considered disloyal or disruptive to the operations of other camps. Inmates from other camps were sent here to segregate them from the general population. Draft resisters and others who protested the injustices of the camps, including by their answers on the loyalty questionnaire, were sent here. At its peak, Tule Lake Segregation Center was the largest, with 18,700 incarcerated people, of the ten camps and the most controversial. 29,840 people were imprisoned over four years.

After the war, it became a holding area for Japanese Americans slated for deportation or expatriation to Japan, including some who had renounced US citizenship under duress. Many joined a class action suit because of civil rights abuses; many gained the chance to stay in the United States through court hearings, but did not regain their citizenship due to opposition by the Department of Justice. The camp closed March 20, 1946, seven months after the end of the war. Twenty years later, members of the class action suit gained restoration of US citizenship through court rulings.

California later designated the Tule Lake camp site as a California Historical Landmark and in 2006, it was named a National Historic Landmark. In December 2008, the Tule Lake Unit was designated by President George W. Bush as one of nine sites—the only one in the contiguous 48 states—to be part of the new World War II Valor in the Pacific National Monument, marking areas of major events during the war. In addition to remains of the concentration camp, the national monument unit includes Camp Tulelake, also used during the war; as well as the rock formation known as the Peninsula/Castle Rock. The John D. Dingell Jr. Conservation, Management, and Recreation Act, signed March 12, 2019, split up the three units of the monument, creating a new Tule Lake National Monument.

In 2026, the National Trust for Historic Preservation listed the location on their annual "America's 11 Most Endangered Historic Places" due to a lack of protection on the majority of land and a proposed construction project.

== History ==
Tule Lake War Relocation Center - Master Layout

Executive Order 9066, issued by President Franklin D. Roosevelt in early 1942 as a response to the attack on Pearl Harbor, authorized establishing an Exclusion Zone on the West Coast, from which local military authorities could remove certain populations under wartime exigency. Military commanders ordered the forced removal and incarceration of the nearly 120,000 Japanese Americans living on the West Coast of the United States, two-thirds of whom were United States citizens. A late 20th-century study revealed that internal government studies of the time recommended against such mass exclusion and incarceration, and the study concluded this decision was based on racism, wartime hysteria and failed political leadership.

The War Relocation Authority (WRA) built ten concentration camps, referred to euphemistically as "relocation centers", in remote rural areas in the interior of the country. Tule Lake Relocation Center opened on May 27, 1942, and initially held approximately 11,800 Japanese Americans, who were primarily from Sacramento, King and Hood River counties in California, Washington and Oregon, respectively.

The Tulean Dispatch is a newsletter that was established in June 1942 and ended in October 1943, when Tule Lake became a segregation center. It was the shortest-running newspaper of the ten concentration camps.

In late 1943, the WRA issued a questionnaire intended to assess the loyalty of imprisoned Japanese Americans. The "loyalty questionnaire", as it came to be known, was originally a form circulated among draft-age men whom the military hoped to conscript into service—after assessing their loyalty and "Americanness". It soon was made mandatory for all adults in the ten camps. Two questions stirred up confusion and unrest among camp inmates. Question 27 asked, "Are you willing to serve in the armed forces of the United States on combat duty, wherever ordered?" The final question 28 asked, "Will you swear unqualified allegiance to the United States and faithfully defend the United States from any or all attack by foreign or domestic forces, and forswear any form of allegiance or obedience to the Japanese emperor, or any other foreign government, power or organization?" If internees answer no to both of these questions, they would be labeled as a "no-no". The WRA would then send those internees to the Tule Lake Segregation Camp. If internees refused to answer these questions, they could be charged with a $10,000 fine or up to 20 years in prison or both. Since this charge was unconstitutional, those who would go to prison would instead go to the Tule Lake Isolation Center which is a prison within the camp.

The first question met resistance from young men who, while not opposed to military service outright, felt insulted that the government, having stripped them of their rights as citizens, would ask them to risk their lives in combat. Many responded with qualified statements such as, "I'll serve in the Army when my family is freed", or refused to answer the questions altogether.

Many interns had problems with the second question. Many were insulted that the question implied they ever had allegiance to a country they had either left behind decades before or, for most US citizens, never visited. Others, especially the non-citizen Issei, feared they would be deported to Japan no matter how they answered, and worried that an affirmative answer would cause them to be seen as enemy aliens by the Japanese. Issei, and many Nisei and Kibei who held dual citizenship, worried they would lose their Japanese citizenship, leaving them stateless if they were expatriated from the United States, which they feared was inevitable, given what had already occurred. In addition to these concerns, some inmates answered "no" to both questions in protest of their imprisonment and loss of civil rights. Often Issei and Kibei, who spoke little or no English, simply did not understand the poorly phrased questions or their implications, and did not answer.

=== Tule Lake Segregation Center ===
Japanese Americans who protested or resisted the unjust World War II detention were segregated and imprisoned at Tule Lake. More than 24,000 men, women and children were confined here.

In 1943 the center was renamed the Tule Lake Segregation Center. The War Relocation Authority proposed to use it to separate inmates suspected of being disloyal or those who protested conditions and were disruptive in their camps. It was fortified as a maximum security facility and it quickly became the most repressive of the government's 10 concentration camps. This camp consisted of twenty eight guarded towers, eight tanks, and an abundant amount of machine guns. Interns who had responded with unqualified "yes" answers to the loyalty questionnaire were given the choice to transfer from Tule Lake to another WRA camp. Approximately 6,500 "loyal" Tule Lake inmates were transferred to six camps in Colorado, Utah, Idaho, and Arkansas.

The more than 12,000 imprisoned Japanese Americans classified as "disloyal" because of their responses to the poorly worded loyalty questions were gradually transferred to Tule Lake during the remainder of 1943. Unsanitary, squalid living conditions, inadequate medical care, poor food, and unsafe or underpaid working conditions prompted prisoner protests at Tule Lake and several other camps. On November 14, after a series of meetings and demonstrations by prisoners over the poor living conditions at the overpopulated camp, the army imposed martial law in Tule Lake. The Army had additional barracks constructed early in 1944 to accommodate a second influx of segregated inmates, pushing the already swollen population to 18,700. The camp quickly became violent and unsafe. Martial law in Tule Lake ended on January 15, 1944, but many prisoners were bitter after months of living with a curfew, unannounced barrack searches, and restrictions that put a stop to recreational activities and most employment in the camp.

In the spring of 1944, Ernest Besig of the Northern California branch of the ACLU became aware of a hastily constructed stockade at Tule Lake, in which internees were routinely being brutalized and held for months without due process. Besig was forbidden by the national ACLU to intervene on behalf of the stockade prisoners or even to visit the Tule Lake camp without prior written approval from the ACLU's Roger Baldwin. Unable to help directly, Besig turned to civil rights attorney Wayne M. Collins for assistance. Collins, using the threat of habeas corpus suits, managed to have the stockade closed down. A year later, after learning that the stockade had been reestablished, he returned to the camp and had it closed down for good.

On July 1, the Renunciation Act of 1944, drafted by Attorney General Francis Biddle, was passed into law; U.S. citizens could, during time of war, renounce their citizenship without first leaving the country—and once they did, the government could treat them as enemy aliens, and detain or deport them with impunity. Angry at the abuses of their U.S. citizenship and convinced there was nothing left for them in the country of their birth, or coerced either by WRA authorities and pro-Japan groups in camp, a total of 5,589 Nisei and Kibei internees chose to renounce their citizenship. Ninety-eight percent of those who renounced their citizenship were inmates at Tule Lake, where conditions had been so harsh.

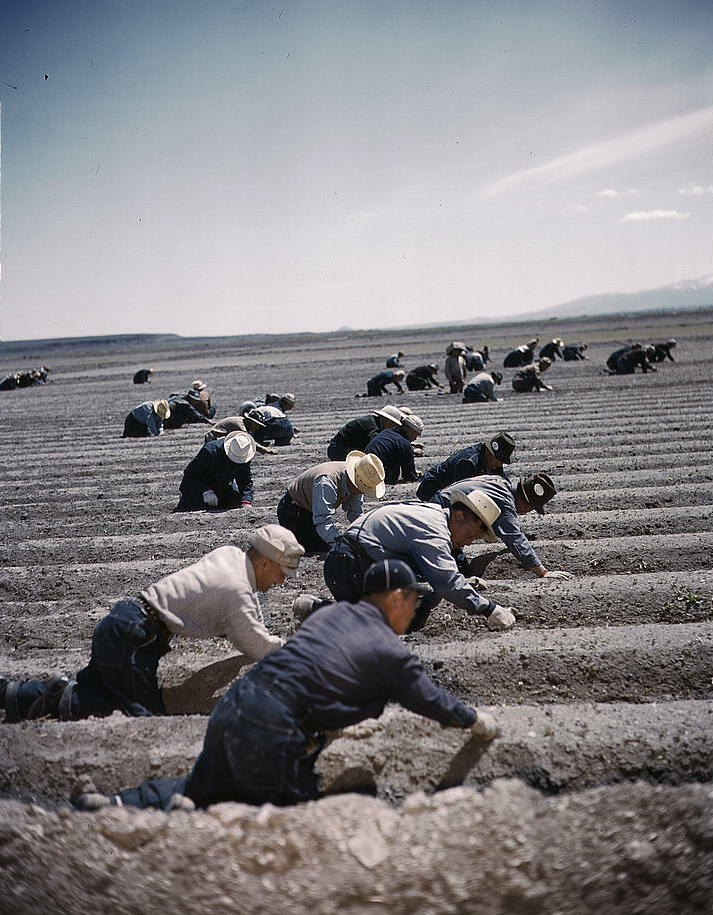
Internees transplanting celery at Tule Lake War Relocation Center

In 1945 after the war's end, the other nine WRA camps were closed as Japanese Americans gradually returned to their hometowns or settled elsewhere. Tule Lake was operated to hold those who had renounced their citizenship and Issei who had requested repatriation to Japan. Most no longer wished to leave the United States (and many had never truly wanted to leave in the first place). Those who wanted to stay in the United States and regain their citizenship (if they had it), were confined in Tule Lake until hearings at which their cases would be heard and fates determined. After the last cases were decided, the camp closed in March 1946. Although these Japanese Americans were released from camp and allowed to stay in the U.S., Nisei and Kibei who had renounced their citizenship were not able to have it restored. Wayne M. Collins filed a class action suit on their behalf and the presiding judge voided the renunciations, finding they had been given under duress, but the ruling was overturned by the Department of Justice.

After a 23-year legal battle, Collins finally succeeded in gaining restoration in the late 1960s of the citizenship of those covered by the class action suit. Collins also helped 3,000 of the 4,327 Japanese Americans originally slated for deportation remain in the United States as their choice.

== Victory for Tule Lake draft resisters ==
Mr. Masaaki Kuwabara (1913–1993)

Some of the Japanese-American draft resisters wanted to use their cases to challenge their incarceration and loss of rights as US citizens. United States v. Masaaki Kuwabara was the only World War II-era Japanese-American draft resistance case to be dismissed out of court based on a due process violation of the U.S. Constitution. It was a forerunner of the Korematsu and Endo cases argued before the US Supreme Court, later in December 1944.

Judge Louis E. Goodman went out of his way to help fellow native Californian and lead defendant Masaaki Kuwabara by hand-picking his defense attorney, Blaine McGowan, who entered a Motion to Quash Proceedings based on the government's abrogation of his client's due process rights, guaranteed to every American citizen by the U.S. Constitution. Without explicitly describing Kuwabara as a victim of federal anti-Japanese racism, Judge Goodman viewed the man's experience in this light. He ruled against the United States, which incarcerated the defendant in a U.S. concentration camp; categorized him as a Class 4-C Enemy Alien; and then drafted him into military service. Kuwabara refused to obey the draft until his rights as an American citizen were restored to him.

== Events since the late 20th century ==
Japanese-American activists revisited the civil rights issues of the forced relocation and incarceration of their people from the West Coast. In Hawaii, where 150,000 Japanese Americans comprised one-third of the population, only a small number were interned during the war. Japanese-American groups began to organize to educate the public, build support for their case, and lobby the government for redress. Finally the Japanese American Citizens League joined this movement, although it had initially opposed it.

=== Pilgrimages ===
Starting in 1974, Tule Lake was the site of several pilgrimages by activists calling for an official apology from the U.S. government for the injustices to Japanese Americans, both citizens and non-citizens. The pilgrimages (every even year, around the 4th of July), serving educational purposes, continue to this day. This Redress Movement gradually gained widespread support and Congress passed the Civil Liberties Act of 1988, which was signed into law by President Ronald Reagan. It included an official governmental apology for the injustices and payment of compensation to camp survivors. A similar law was passed in 1992 to provide for compensation to additional Japanese Americans.

Groups making the annual pilgrimage have organized them around specific themes, and used them as a basis for education, as in the following:

Recent themes

- 2000 – 'Honoring our Living Treasures, Forging New Links' (7/1-4)
- 2002 – 'As We Revisit the Meaning of Patriotism and Loyalty' (7/4-7)
- 2004 – 'Citizens Betrayed' (7/2-5)
- 2006 – 'Dignity and Survival in a Divided Community'
- 2009 – 'Shared Remembrances' (7/2-5)
- 2010 – 'Untold Stories of Tule Lake' (7/2-5)
- 2012 – 'Understanding No-No and Renunciation' (6/30-7/3)

=== Federal grant program ===
On December 21, 2006, U.S. President George W. Bush signed H.R. 1492 into law, creating the Japanese American Confinement Sites grant program. This authorized the appropriation of $38,000,000 in federal grant money to preserve and interpret the system of Japanese-American incarceration sites, including the temporary WCCA sites, the ten WRA concentration camps and the Department of Justice internment camps.

== Monument management ==
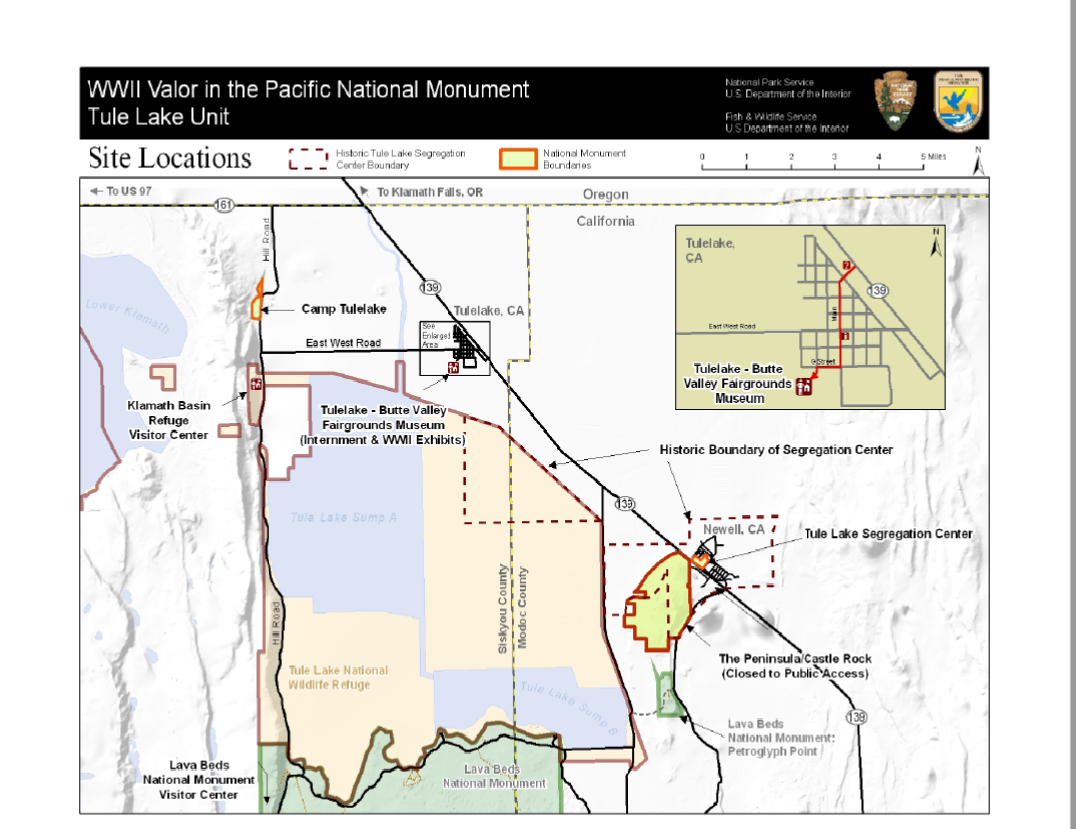
Map of the Tule Lake National Monument

The Monument is jointly managed by the National Park Service (NPS) and the U.S. Fish and Wildlife Service (USFWS) with a total area of 1,391 acres (5.63 km^{2}).

The national monument consists of three separate units: the Tule Lake Segregation Center near Newell, nearby Camp Tulelake, and a rock formation known as the Peninsula/Castle Rock near Newell. The Tule Lake Segregation Center is solely managed by the NPS. Camp Tulelake is jointly managed by the NPS and USFWS; the USFWS manages/owns the land, and the NPS maintains the buildings and provides interpretive programs. The Peninsula/Castle Rock is solely managed by the USFWS. Locally, USFWS responsibilities are handled by the administration of Lava Beds National Monument and the Tule Lake National Wildlife Refuge.

== Notable inmates ==
- Violet Kazue de Cristoforo (1917–2007), poet. Also interned at Jerome.
- Mitsuye Endo (1920–2006), plaintiff of the Ex parte Endo Supreme Court case that led to Japanese Americans being allowed to return to the West Coast and to the closing of the war relocation camps. Also interned at Topaz.
- Mary Matsuda Gruenewald (1925–2021), memoirist. Also interned at Heart Mountain.
- Taneyuki "Dan" Harada (1923–2020), a painter and computer programmer. Also interned at Topaz.
- Hiroshi Honda (1910–1970), an American painter.
- Yamato Ichihashi (1878–1963), one of the first academics of Asian ancestry in the United States.
- Emerick Ishikawa (1920–2006), a weightlifting champion.

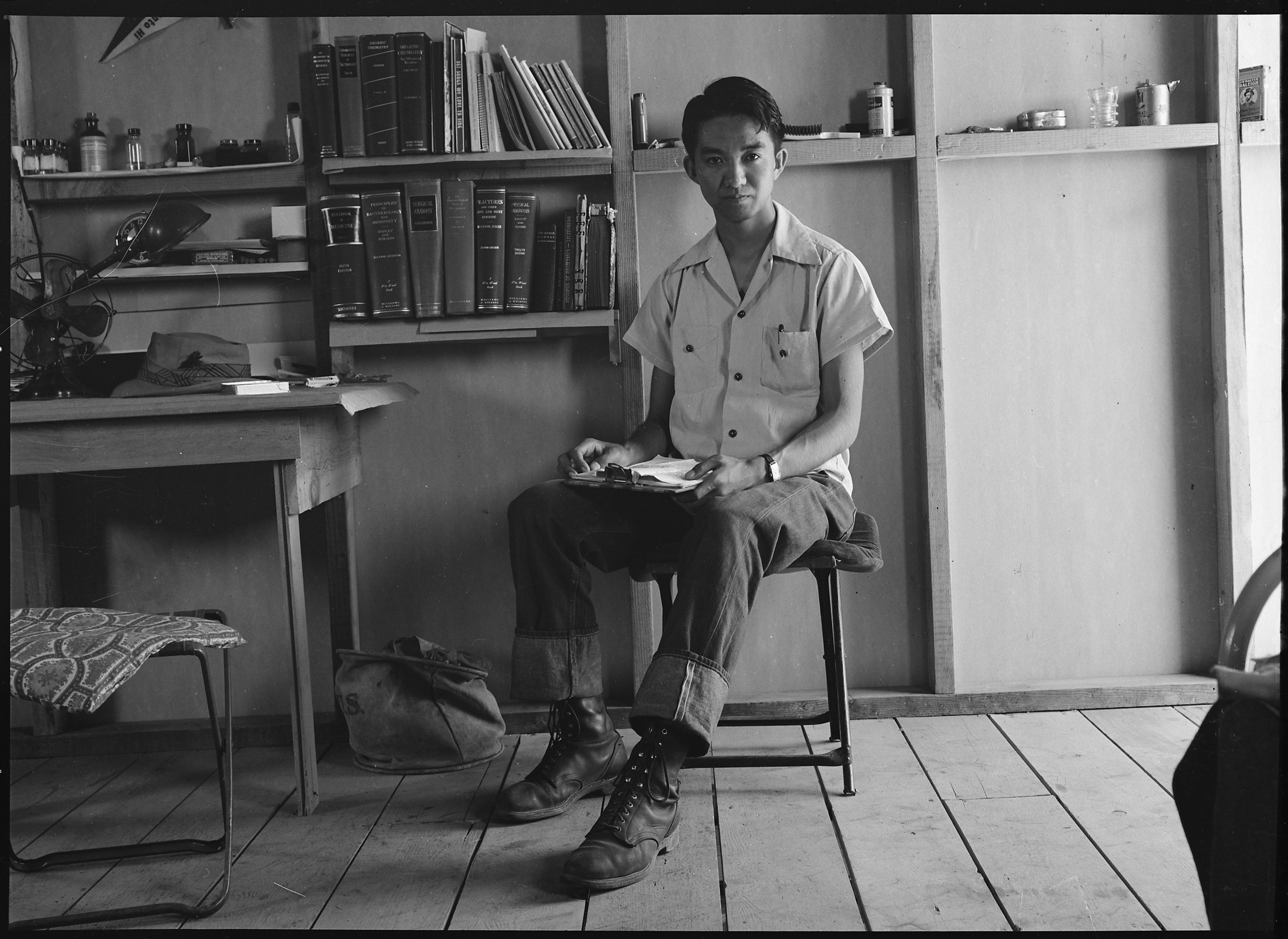
Recent UC Berkeley valedictorian Harvey Itano at Sacramento Assembly Center in May 1942, prior to his incarceration at Tule Lake

- Harvey Itano (1920–2010), became a biochemist best known for his work on the molecular basis of sickle cell anemia and other diseases.
- Shizue Iwatsuki (1897–1984), a Japanese American poet. Also interned at Minidoka.
- Hiroshi Kashiwagi (1922–2019), became a poet, playwright and actor.
- Taky Kimura (1924–2021), martial arts practitioner and instructor. Also interned at Minidoka.
- Daisuke Kitagawa (1910–1970), a reverend and episcopal priest
- Mary Koga (née Mary Hisako Ishii, 1920–2001), a photographer and social worker.
- Tommy Kono (1930–2016), an Olympic gold medalist weightlifter and world record holder.
- Joseph Kurihara (1895–1965), a renunciant. Also interned at Manzanar.
- Masaaki Kuwabara (1913–1993), lead defendant in United States v. Masaaki Kuwabara, the only Japanese-American draft resistance case to be dismissed on the basis of a due process violation of the U.S. Constitution.
- William M. Marutani (1923–2004), lawyer, judge, and member of the Commission on Wartime Relocation and Internment of Civilians
- Bob Matsui (1941–2005), was elected to 13-terms as member of the U.S. House of Representatives.
- Toshiko Mayeda (née Kuki) (1923–2004), a Japanese American chemist
- Tsutomu "Jimmy" Mirikitani (1920–2012), Sacramento, California), artist and subject of The Cats of Mirikitani, an award-winning documentary film.
- Fujimatsu Moriguchi (1898–1962), an American businessman
- Sadako Moriguchi (née Tsutakawa) (1907–2002), an American businesswoman
- Tomio Moriguchi (born 1936), an American businessman and civil rights activist
- Tomoko Moriguchi-Matsuno (née Moriguchi), (born 1945), an American businesswoman
- Pat Morita (1932–2005), an actor best known for his role in the Karate Kid films; interned as a child with his family. Also interned at Gila River.
- Jimmy Murakami (1933–2014), an animator and director.
- George Nakano (born 1935), a former California State Assemblyman. Also interned at Jerome.
- Alan Nakanishi (born 1940), a California politician
- James K. Okubo (1920–1967), a United States Army soldier and a recipient of the Medal of Honor. Also interned at Heart Mountain.
- James Otsuka (1921–1984), a conscientious objector during World War II and a war tax resister.
- Otokichi Ozaki (1904–1983), a poet. Also interned at Jerome.
- James Sakoda (1916–2005), a psychologist and pioneer in computational modeling. Also interned at Minidoka.
- Minako Sasaki (1943–2023), an actress. Also interned at Jerome.
- Toshiyuki Seino (born 1938), an American competitive judo athlete.
- Joan Shigekawa (born 1936), an American film and television producer, cultural grantmaker, and arts administrator.
- Yuki Shimoda (1921–1981), an actor.
- Sab Shimono (born 1937), an actor. Also interned at Granada.
- Hana Shimozumi (1893–1978), an American singer.
- Noboru Shirai, author of "Tule Lake: An Issei Memoir". Born in Hiroshima, Japan, he emigrated to the U.S. in 1934, married Akiko May Taketa (a UC Berkeley graduate born and raised in Sacramento) and was a graduate student at Stanford University in 1942. After his release from Tule Lake, Shirai became a successful California businessman.
- Robert Mitsuhiro Takasugi (1930–2009), first Japanese-American appointed to the federal bench.
- George Takei (born 1937), an American actor best known for his role in Star Trek. Also interned at Rohwer.
- George T. Tamura (1927–2010), an artist.
- Kazue Togasaki (1897–1992), one of the first two women of Japanese ancestry to earn a medical degree in the United States. Also interned at Topaz and Manzanar.
- Teiko Tomita (1896–1990), a tanka poet. Also interned at Heart Mountain.
- Taitetsu Unno (1930–2014), a Buddhist scholar, lecturer, and author. Also interned at Rohwer.
- Harry Urata (1917–2009), a music teacher
- Jimi Yamaichi member of the 27 draft resisters of conscience, a Tule Lake survivor who shares his memories at the biennial pilgrimages, and promotes preservation of the site.
- Koho Yamamoto (born 1922), an American artist. Also interned at Topaz.
- Takuji Yamashita (1874–1959), an early 20th-century civil rights pioneer. Also interned at Manzanar and Minidoka.
- Kenneth Yasuda (1914–2002), scholar and translator. Also interned at Jerome.
- David Ikeda (1920–2015), a painter and store owner.

== Terminology ==
Since the end of World War II, there has been debate over the terminology used to refer to Tule Lake, and the other camps in which Japanese Americans were imprisoned by the United States Government during the war. Tule Lake has been referred to as a "relocation camp", "relocation center", "internment camp", "concentration camp", and "segregation center", and the controversy over which term is the most accurate and appropriate continues into the early 21st century. Activists and scholars believe the government terms: relocation and internment, are euphemisms for forced deportation and concentration camps.

In 1998, use of the term "concentration camps" gained greater credibility prior to the opening of an exhibit at Ellis Island about the World War II incarceration of Japanese Americans. Initially, the American Jewish Committee (AJC) and the National Park Service, which manages Ellis Island, objected to the use of the term in the exhibit. But, during a subsequent meeting held at the offices of the AJC in New York City, leaders representing Japanese Americans and Jewish Americans reached an understanding about the use of the term. After the meeting, the Japanese American National Museum and the AJC issued a joint statement (which was included in the exhibit) that read in part:

A concentration camp is a place where people are imprisoned not because of any crimes they have committed, but simply because of who they are. Although many groups have been singled out for such persecution throughout history, the term 'concentration camp' was first used at the turn of the century in the Spanish–American and Boer Wars. During World War II, America's concentration camps were clearly distinguishable from Nazi Germany's. Nazi camps were places of torture, barbarous medical experiments and summary executions; some were extermination centers with gas chambers. Six million Jews were slaughtered in the Holocaust. Many others, including Gypsies, Poles, homosexuals and political dissidents were also victims of the Nazi concentration camps. In recent years, concentration camps have existed in the former Soviet Union, Cambodia and Bosnia. Despite differences, all had one thing in common: the people in power removed a minority group from the general population and the rest of society let it happen.

The New York Times published an unsigned editorial supporting the use of the term "concentration camp" in the exhibit. An article quoted Jonathan Mark, a columnist for The Jewish Week, who wrote, "Can no one else speak of slavery, gas, trains, camps? It's Jewish malpractice to monopolize pain and minimize victims." AJC Executive Director David A. Harris stated during the controversy, "We have not claimed Jewish exclusivity for the term 'concentration camps.'"

On July 7, 2012, at their annual convention, the National Council of the Japanese American Citizens League unanimously ratified the Power of Words Handbook, calling for the use of:

truthful and accurate terms, and retiring the misleading euphemisms created by the government to cover up the denial of Constitutional and human rights, the force, oppressive conditions, and racism against 120,000 innocent people of Japanese ancestry locked up in America's World War II concentration camps.

== See also ==
- Bibliography of the Japanese American Internment during World War II
- Outline of Japanese American Internment during World War II
- List of national monuments of the United States
- Ansel Adams
- California Water Wars
- Densho: The Japanese American Legacy Project
- Dorothea Lange
- Other camps:
  - Gila River War Relocation Center
  - Granada War Relocation Center
  - Heart Mountain War Relocation Center
  - Jerome War Relocation Center

- Minidoka National Historic Site
- Poston War Relocation Center
- Rohwer War Relocation Center
- Topaz War Relocation Center

- California during World War II
