= 1st Cavalry Regiment (United States) =

1st Cavalry Regiment (1st Regiment of Dragoons)
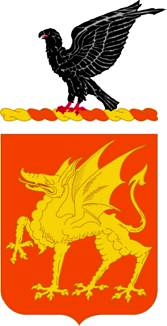
- Coat of arms
- Active: 1833–present
- Country: United States of America
- Branch: United States Army
- Type: Cavalry
- Nickname: "1st Regiment of Dragoons"
- Mottos: Animo Et Fide ("Courageous and Faithful")
- Engagements: First Dragoon Expedition; Mexican-American War; American Indian Wars; American Civil War; Spanish–American War; Philippine–American War; Escobar Rebellion; Johnson's Ranch Raid; World War II; Operation Torch; Tunisian Campaign; Battle of Salerno; Battle of Anzio; Battle of Cassino; Gothic Line; Spring 1945 offensive in Italy; Vietnam War; Gulf War; Bosnian War; Iraq War; War in Afghanistan

Commanders
- Notable commanders: Julien E. V. Gaujot; Hamilton S. Hawkins III; Guy H. Preston; LeRoy Eltinge; Daniel Van Voorhis; Adna R. Chaffee Jr.

The 1st Cavalry Regiment is a United States Army regiment that has its antecedents in the early 19th century in the formation of the United States Regiment of Dragoons. To this day, the unit's special designation is "First Regiment of Dragoons". While they were the First Regiment of Dragoons, another unit designated the 1st Cavalry Regiment was formed in 1855 and in 1861 was re-designated the 4th Cavalry Regiment (units were renumbered based on seniority, and it was the fourth oldest mounted regiment in active service). The First Dragoons became the 1st Cavalry Regiment, since they were the oldest mounted regiment.

== Background ==
During the American Revolutionary War (1775–1783), Continental forces patterned cavalry units after those of the opposing British forces, especially the well-supplied mounted dragoons of the British Army. The first cavalry unit formed by the Congress of the United States of America was a squadron of four troops (the Squadron of Light Dragoons) commanded by Major Michael Rudolph on 5 March 1792 (the troops would then be incorporated into the Legion of the United States (1792 to 1796)). In 1796 the dragoons were reduced to two companies, were dismounted units by 1800 and disbanded in 1802. In 1808 the Regiment of Light Dragoons was formed and in 1812 another regiment (2nd Regiment of Light Dragoons) was raised. Units of both regiments of dragoons served during the War of 1812 in engagements at the Battle of the Mississinewa; the Battle of Lundy's Lane; Fort Erie and the Siege of Fort Meigs. The 1st Regiment and 2nd Regiment were consolidated on 30 March 1814 into the single Regiment of Light Dragoons of eight troops, but this unit was dissolved in 1815 (the rationale was that cavalry forces were too expensive to maintain as part of a standing army, so Congress insisted on economy and a minimum standing Army).

== Formation ==
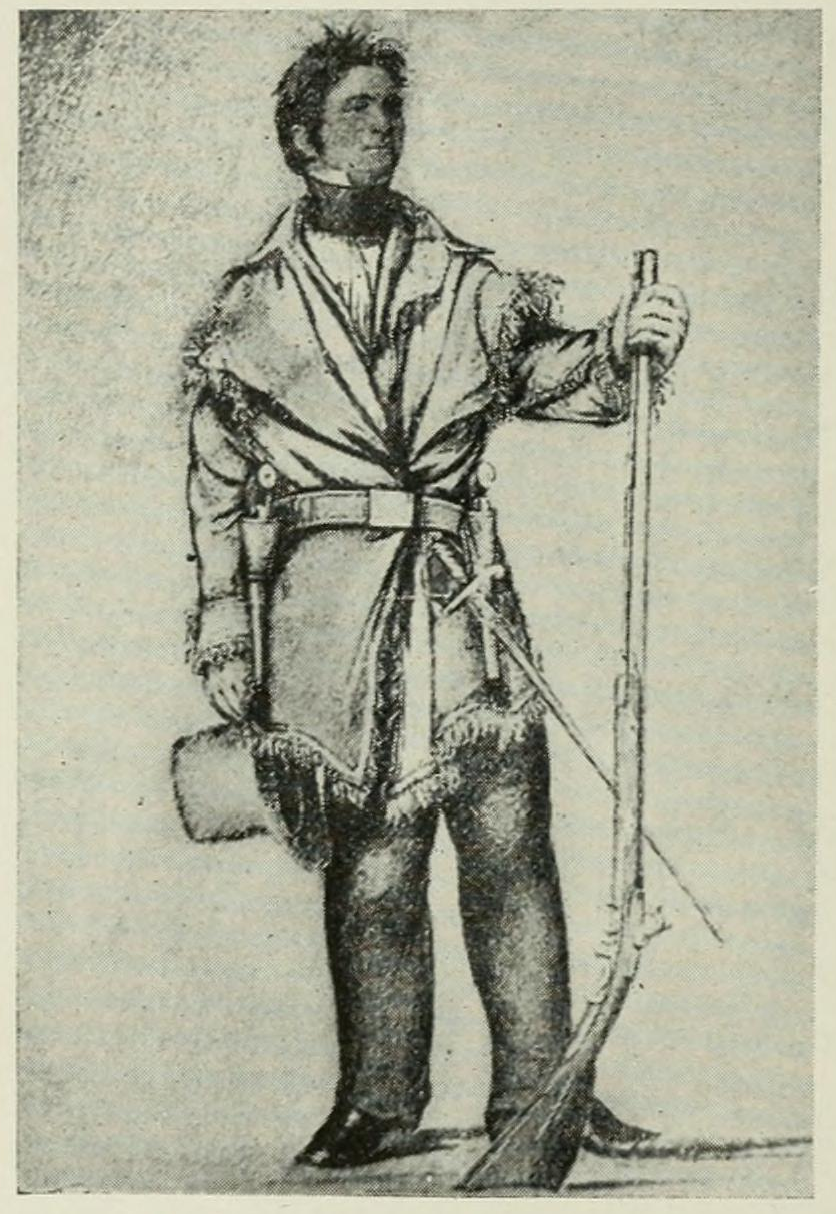
George Catlin sketch of Colonel Henry Dodge, commander of the Battalion of Mounted Rangers, 1833.

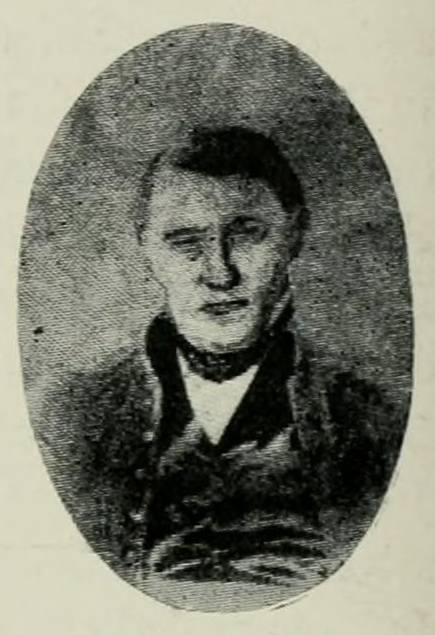
Captain Nathan Boone

The "United States Regiment of Dragoons" was organized by an Act of Congress approved on 2 March 1833 after the disbandment of the "Battalion of Mounted Rangers" (formed in 1832 due to a lack of mounted units to patrol the frontier and also in response to the Black Hawk War). The first order announcing appointments in the regiment was dated 5 March 1833, and gave the names of the colonel, lieutenant-colonel, major, four captains and four lieutenants, stating that the organization of the regiment would be perfected by the selection of officers from the "Battalion of Mounted Rangers." In June 1834, the regiment filled its complement of officers, many of whom later became noted Civil War generals:

- Colonel: Henry Dodge (transferred from the Battalion of Mounted Rangers)
- Lieutenant Colonel: Stephen W. Kearny (transferred from the 3d Infantry Regiment)
- Major: Richard B. Mason.
- Captains: Clifton Wharton, E. V. Sumner, Eustace Trenor, David Hunter, Lemuel Ford, Nathan Boone, J. B. Browne, Jesse Bean, Matthew Duncan and David Perkins.
- First Lieutenants: Philip St. George Cooke (transferred from the 6th Infantry Regiment), S. W. Moore, A. Van Buren, J. F. Izard, L. P. Lupton, Thomas Swords, T. B. Wheelock, J. W. Hamilton (adjutant), B. D. Moore, C. F. M. Noland, and Jefferson Davis (transferred from the 1st Infantry Regiment, and served as the first adjutant, but resigned the staff position on 4 February 1834, and was assigned to Company A).
- Second Lieutenants: James Allen, Theophilus H. Holmes, J. H. K. Burgwin, J. S. Van Derveer, J. W. Shaumburg, Enoch Steen, James Clyman, J. L. Watson, and B. A. Terrett.
- Brevet Second Lieutenants: William Eustis, G. W. McClure, L. B. Northrop, G. P. Kingsbury, J. M. Bowman, Asbury Ury, A. G. Edwards and T. J. McKean.

The regiment was initially organized as:

- Headquarters: Jefferson Barracks, Missouri: 4 March 1833
- Troop A: Nashville, Tennessee: 12 August 1833
- Troop B: Sacketts Harbor, New York: 29 July 1833
- Troop C: Louisville, Kentucky: June 1833
- Troop D: Cincinnati, Ohio: 25 July 1833
- Troop E: New York, New York: 29 June 1833
- Troop F: Jefferson Barracks: 5 December 1833
- Troop G: Jefferson Barracks: 16 January 1834
- Troop H: Jefferson Barracks: 2 March 1834

The unit became the "First Regiment of Dragoons" when the Second Dragoons was raised in 1836.

== Frontier duty ==
In October 1833, the five companies first organized were sent under Colonel Dodge to winter in the vicinity of Fort Gibson, Arkansas Territory, where they remained until June 1834. Then, the regiment was sent on the First Dragoon Expedition, or the Pawnee Expedition, during which, although it ended in September, a full one-fourth of the officers and men died of fever. For the winter, Headquarters with Companies A, C, D and G, were sent to Fort Leavenworth; Companies B, H and I, Lieutenant Colonel Kearny, commanding, into the Indian country on the right bank of the Mississippi River, near the mouth of the Des Moines River; and Companies E, F and K, Major Mason commanding, to Fort Gibson. Throughout the summer of 1835, all the companies of the regiment were kept in the field.

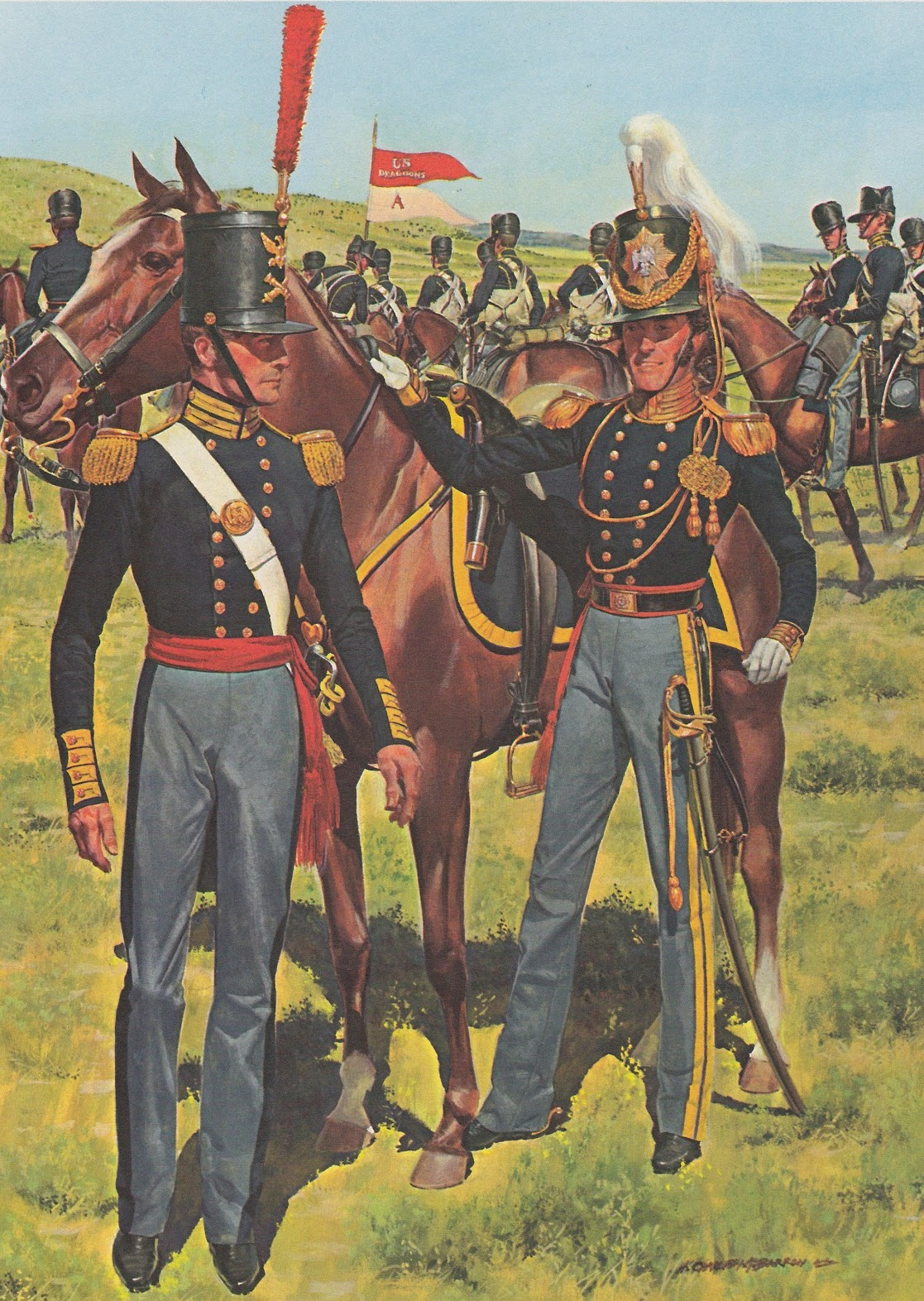
1964 painting of the 1st Regiment of Dragoons in 1836 by H. Charles McBarron Jr.

The regiment became the "First Regiment of Dragoons" when the Second Regiment of Dragoons was raised in 1836; however, the general disposition of the regiment remained unchanged. The various companies were employed in scouting among the Native Americans, especially along the Missouri frontier, with a portion of the regiment going to Nacogdoches, Texas, to keep white trespassers from the Native American lands, and preserving peace between whites and Indians and among the Indians themselves; also in building wagon roads and bridges. During the winter, the companies returned to their respective stations – Forts Leavenworth, Gibson and Des Moines.

Colonel Dodge resigned on 4 July 1836, and was appointed Governor of Wisconsin. He was succeeded by Lieutenant Colonel Kearny. The regiment was not heavily engaged in the Florida war, although it did take some minor casualties, including a lieutenant. In March 1837, a regimental order designated the color of the horses of each company as follows: A and K, black; B, F and H, sorrel; C, D, E and I, bay; and G, iron gray. In October 1837, and again in March 1838, Colonel Kearny led elements of the regiment to quell Osage Indians. In April 1839, the army created Fort Wayne in Indian Territory, and Companies E, F, G and K, were stationed there for several years, with occasional forays into the field to chase hostile Indians. Kearny was promoted to brigadier general on 30 June 1846, and was succeeded by Colonel Mason.

== Mexican–American War ==
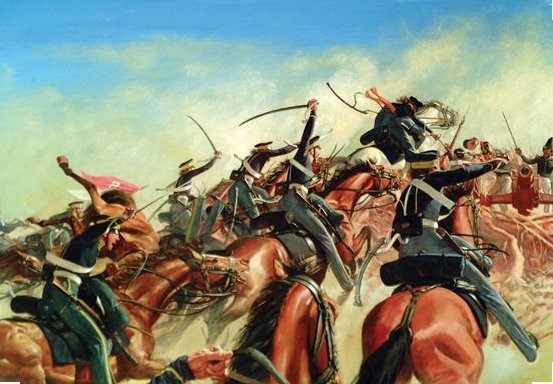
1st Regiment of Dragoons in Mexican–American War

General Kearny was placed in command of the "Army of the West (1846)", which consisted of Companies B, C, G, I and K, 1st Dragoons, an artillery battalion, some separate infantry companies, two regiments of Missouri volunteer cavalry, the volunteer Mormon Battalion, and the 1st Regiment of New York Volunteers, which sailed from New York City to California by ship. All in all, the Army of the West consisted of about 3,700 men, which ventured west to New Mexico, some of whom did not reach California. This command was concentrated at Bent's Fort on the Arkansas River, from which point it marched for Santa Fé on 1 August 1846. The force occupied Santa Fé without much opposition, and, after leaving part of his force there, Kearny marched into California, arriving in December.

On the morning of 6 December 1846, Kearny's 150-man command met and defeated an equal number of California lancers at San Pasqual, about 40 miles from San Diego, under Major Andrés Pico. The action was severe, with the 1st Dragoons losing 3 officers and 14 men killed, principally with lance thrusts. General Kearny himself received two wounds. His force finally reached San Diego on 12 December 1846.

Kearny, with a force consisting of Company C, 1st Dragoons, (60 dismounted men) under Captain Turner, sailors and marines with a battery of artillery and California volunteers, left San Diego for Los Angeles on 29 December. Kearny's troops routed Mexicans under Governor Flores at the crossing of the Rio San Gabriel on 8 January 1847, and on the plains of La Mesa on 9 January. With the capture of Los Angeles on the following day, all Mexican resistance to the American occupation of Southern California ceased.

Kearny had left Companies G and I at Albuquerque under Capt. J. H. K. Burgwin. When Col. Sterling Price (then in command at Santa Fé) learned of the seizure and murder of the New Mexico Governor Charles Bent and five others by the Mexicans (20 January), he moved out against them with a force of about 350 dismounted men and easily defeated them, on 24 January, at Canada. Captain Burgwin defeated another Mexican force shortly thereafter and rejoined Price's column for a series of further battles.

During 1847, regimental headquarters were still at Leavenworth and Companies A and E were with Zachary Taylor in Mexico. Early in the year, Company B was reorganized at Jefferson Barracks before being sent to Santa Fe in June. On 26 June, while en route, the company was engaged by 300-400 Comanches at Grand Prairie, Arkansas, losing five men killed and six wounded. They were the first unit of the Regiment to seriously tangle with the frontier Indians. Upon reaching Santa Fe, on 6 August with the $350,000 they had been escorting, Company B was retrained as a field artillery battery to support the regiment.

Companies D, F and K saw service on Scott's line in Mexico. Company F escorted General Scott from Veracruz to Mexico City and was present at the battles near that city. From 1 November to 20 December, it was engaged on escort duty between the city and Vera Cruz. In 1848, the three companies returned to the United States and were stationed at various points on the northwestern frontier. Companies B, G, and I served with General Sterling Price in February – March 1848 in his campaign down into the State of Chihuahua and participated in the attack on Santa Cruz de Rosales. Company D was sent to the Minnesota Territory commanded by Lieut. J. W. T. Gardiner. In the summer of 1849 they escorted Maj. Woods of the 6th Infantry at Fort Snelling, to mark a northern boundary line and select a site for a future fortification near Pembina.

== Further frontier duty ==
In September 1848, the First Regiment of Dragoons rode out of Fort Kearny and returned to Fort Leavenworth in Kansas and trained their new recruits. On 11 May 1849, the regiment rode further west, and along with two companies of the 6th Infantry Regiment, guarded the treacherous Oregon Trail in the heart of Pawnee territory. In October, an engagement on the Little Blue River near Linden, Nebraska and another engagement on the Platte River resulted in numerous Pawnee fatalities, and 5 Dragoon casualties. On 15 May 1850, J. W. Davidson and Captain Nathaniel Lyon led a regiment of the 1st U.S. Dragoons in a massacre of at least 200-400 Pomo Native Americans at Clear Lake, California, the 1850 "Bloody Island Massacre";

Brevet Brigadier General Mason, Colonel of the 1st Dragoons, died at Jefferson Barracks, on 25 July 1850, and was succeeded by Col. Thomas T. Fauntleroy, promoted from the Second Dragoons. In 1853, the newly acquired Southwest erupted in violence between the US and local Indian tribes. After a reorganization period, elements of the 1st Regiment of Dragoons set out for New Mexico on 1 July 1854. The year of 1854 was rough for the Dragoons; heavy casualties and a tenacious enemy took their toll.

Earlier in the year, on 30 March 1854, Companies F and I were stationed at Cantonment Burgwin in New Mexico, and Lieutenant J. W. Davidson, with Company I and 16 men of Company F, disobeyed his orders and boldly attacked a Jicarilla Apache camp about 16 miles south of Taos at Cieneguilla. The Indian camp was surprised and captured; while securing the camp, the troops were surprised by more Indians, who attacked the Dragoon horse-holders and took Davidson at such disadvantage that the command narrowly escaped annihilation. Fourteen men of Company I and eight of Company F were killed; Lieutenant Davidson and 14 men were wounded. Regimental headquarters was transferred to Fort Union, New Mexico Territory, in July 1854, when the rest of the regiment arrived. Throughout the following year, the companies in New Mexico were almost constantly on the move. Colonel Fauntleroy made three expeditions against the Utes and Apaches, and Companies I and K fought the Apaches. On 17 January 1855, Companies B, G, and part of K were attacked at night by a band of Apaches while camped near the Penasco River. Despite being repulsed, the Indians adopted guerrilla tactics and skirmished the next day. On the 19th, 12 troopers from B Company became separated and were ambushed by the Apache, suffering 3 killed including the Company Commander.

Meantime, out West, Companies C and E took part in the Rogue River War in Oregon Territory, in which, at the Battle of Hungry Hill, the troops were compelled to retire with a loss of 26 killed and wounded, after fighting for a day and a half.

In the spring of 1855, two new regiments of cavalry, the First and Second Cavalry, were authorized in addition to the current two regiments of dragoons and the Regiment of Mounted Riflemen (formed in 1845). One of these new units named "The First Cavalry Regiment", under the command of Lt. Col. Edwin Vose Sumner, the first regular American military unit to bear that name (in 1861 it was re-designated the 4th Cavalry Regiment). Sumner was previously with the First Dragoons.

Headquarters for the First Dragoons were moved to Fort Tejon, California, in December 1856, with the various companies scattered throughout the West. For the next five years, the regiment engaged in a variety of Indian fights, seeing action at various times against the Navajos and Apaches in the Southwest and several tribes in the Northwest. On 8 January 1859, B and K Companies fought an engagement with the Mojave in the Mohave Valley and another engagement against the Paiutes on 18–19 April 1860 near present-day Yermo, California.

== American Civil War ==
=== 1861–62 ===
Colonel Fauntleroy resigned on 13 May 1861, and was succeeded by Col. Benjamin Lloyd Beall. With the outbreak of the Civil War and the War Department's wanting to re-designate all mounted regiments as cavalry and to renumber them in order of seniority., the First Dragoons became the "First Regiment of Cavalry" by an Act of Congress on 3 August 1861 (the existing First Cavalry Regiment (formed in 1855) was the fourth oldest mounted regiment in terms of active service, so it was re-designated the 4th Cavalry Regiment). During November and December, the regiment, except Companies D and G, which were still stationed in New Mexico Territory, was transferred by steamship from the Pacific Coast through Panama and then to Washington, D.C., arriving by the end of January 1862. Colonel Beall retired 1 February, and was succeeded by Col. George A.H. Blake. The regiment was attached to the 2d Brigade, Cavalry Reserve, Army of the Potomac.

In the meantime, the two companies left in Confederate Arizona had abandoned and destroyed Forts Breckinridge and Buchanan and retreated to Fort Craig. Company D was engaged in a skirmish with Confederates near Fort Craig, on 19 February, and the two companies took part in the Battle of Valverde on 21 February. Company D took part in the engagements at Pigeon's Ranch, 30 March; Albuquerque, 25 April; and Peralta, 27 April.

The bulk of the 1st U.S. Cavalry, meanwhile, fought in the Peninsula Campaign in Virginia. At Williamsburg, on 4 May, a squadron under Capt. Benjamin F. "Grimes" Davis charged and repulsed Confederate cavalry, capturing a flag but losing 13 men. At Gaines' Mill, on 27 June, the regiment lost 26 more men. The regiment participated in fighting at Malvern Hill, Kelly's Ford, and during Stoneman's Raid in April and May.

=== 1863 ===
At the battle of Beverly Ford in June 1863, Davis was killed while in command of the 8th New York Cavalry. At Upperville, the 1st U.S. Cavalry met the Jeff Davis Legion and the 1st and 2d North Carolina regiments in a mounted charge. The regiment lost 53 men (most to saber cuts). At Gettysburg, its loss was 16 men. Several more men were lost in a series of skirmishes during the Confederate retreat to Virginia.

In June 1863, the two companies left in New Mexico were broken up. The officers and noncommissioned officers were transferred to Carlisle Barracks, where the companies were reorganized, joining the regiment at Camp Buford, Maryland, in October 1863. After a period of rest and re-equipping near Washington, D.C., the 1st Cavalry rejoined the Army of the Potomac and was engaged at Manassas Junction and at Catlett's Station, on 5 November; Culpeper, on 8 November; Stephensburg, on 26 November, and Mine River. The regiment was employed during the winter doing picket duty along the Rapidan River.

=== 1864 ===
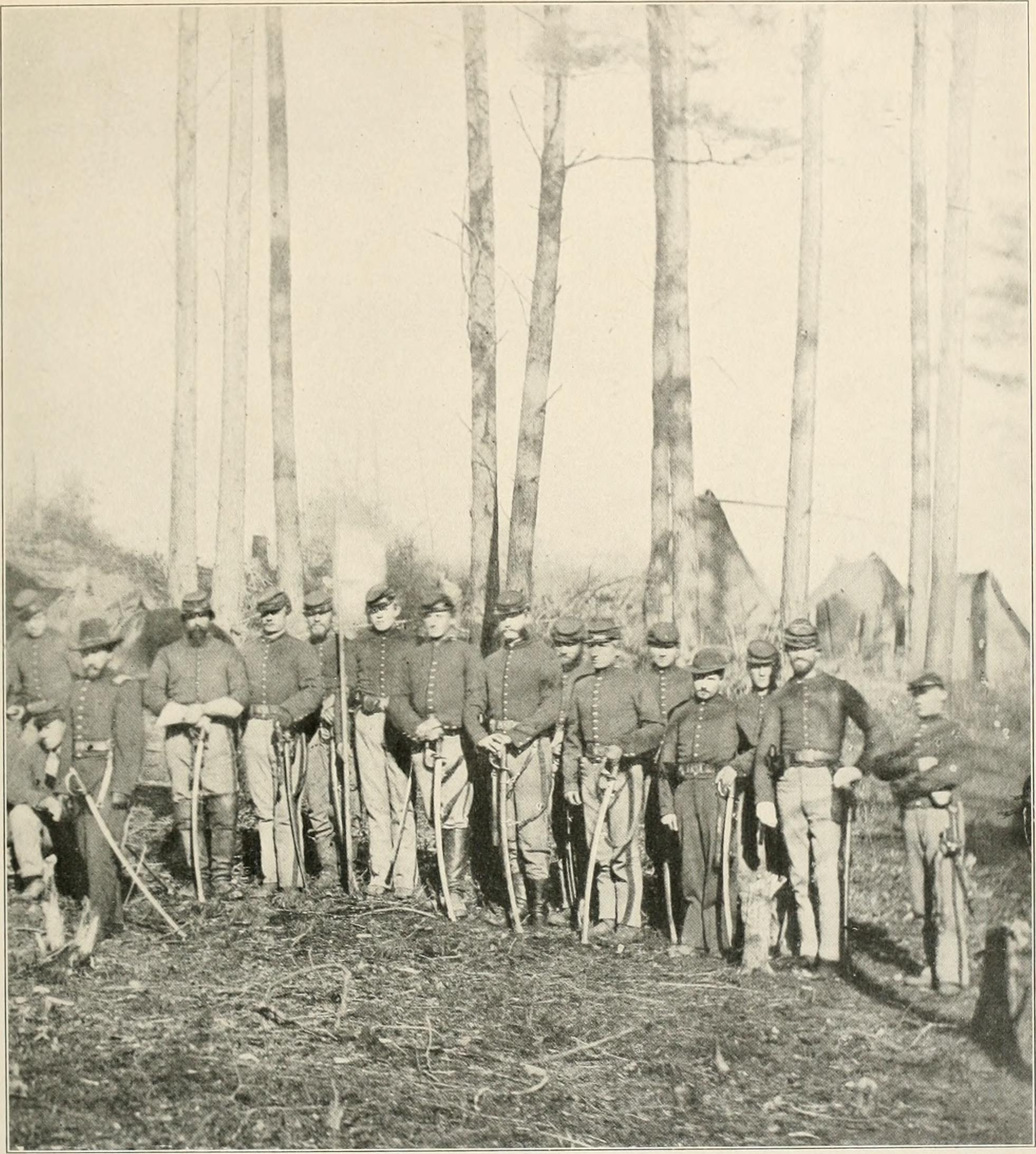
1st Cavalry at Brandy Station, February 1864

In February, the 1st U.S. Cavalry engaged in a series of fights along the Rapidan line, and then accompanied Brig. Gen. George Armstrong Custer in a raid on Charlottesville, Virginia. On General Sheridan's taking command of the Cavalry Corps, the 1st Cavalry, now commanded by Capt. N. B. Sweitzer, was attached to Merritt's Reserve or Regular Brigade, Torbert's Division, and in the preparation for the Overland Campaign, the regiment was employed in picketing the Rapidan, taking part in the battles of Todd's Tavern, on 7 May, and Spotsylvania Court House, on 8 May.

The regiment subsequently accompanied Sheridan on his daring raid around Richmond, fighting at Beaver Dam Station, on 10 May; Yellow Tavern, on 11 May: Meadow Bridge and Mechanicsville, on 12 May; Tunstall's Station, on 14 May; Hawe's Shop, on 28 May; and Old Church, on 30 May.

At the Battle of Cold Harbor, on 1 June, the regiment saw severe fighting, losing several men and officers. The 1st Cavalry then accompanied General Sheridan on his Trevilian raid, and lost 35 men in the Battle of Trevilian Station, on 11 and 12 June. The regiment was engaged in daily skirmishing during the return march to White House Landing, and was engaged there on 17 June, at the Chickahominy River on 18 June, and at the battle of Darby's Farm, on 28 June. The 1st Cavalry captured an enemy flag at the battle of Deep Bottom, on 28 July, where the Regular Brigade, fighting on foot, routed a brigade of Confederate cavalry.

On 31 July, the 1st Division marched to City Point, embarked on ships the next day, and was transported to Washington, D.C. to assist in repelling the threatened attack of General Early. On 5 August, it moved towards Harpers Ferry, having been ordered to the Shenandoah Valley to rejoin Sheridan. On 10 August, the Reserve Brigade routed Confederates near Winchester. The regiment was then engaged in almost daily skirmishing, and took part in all the important valley battles except Fisher's Hill. From 16 August through 20 August, the 1st Cavalry was employed, together with the whole of the 1st Division, in the destruction of all wheat and forage, and the seizure of all horses, cattle, sheep, and hogs accessible in the valley.

The 1st Cavalry took part in the charge of the Reserve Brigade at the Battle of Opequon, on 19 September, and, in conjunction with the 2nd Cavalry, captured two stands of colors and some 200 prisoners. Its casualties were 37 killed, wounded and missing. On 28 September, in an action at Waynesboro, it suffered 18 additional casualties.

The 1st Cavalry played an important part in the Battle of Cedar Creek, 19 October. After the surprise and defeat of Horatio G. Wright in the morning, the divisions of Merritt and Custer came up as reinforcements. Two squadrons of the 1st Cavalry formed perpendicular across the Valley Pike and dismounted behind stone walls, the third squadron being held in reserve. This position was held with great difficulty, the advanced squadron being subjected to an enfilading fire.

The regiment then returned to Middletown and, during the fall and winter, engaged in numerous skirmishes and took part in Merritt's raid through the Loudoun Valley and Torbert's raid on Gordonsville. In December, the regiment was assigned to duty at the Cavalry Corps headquarters in Winchester.

=== 1865 ===
On 27 February, Sheridan commenced his last expedition through the Shenandoah Valley, wanting to destroy the Virginia Central Railroad and the James River Canal, and capture Lynchburg. The 1st Cavalry took part in the Battle of Waynesboro, on 2 March, where the remnant of Early's army was captured. It was then engaged in many skirmishes during a march from Charlottesville to White House Landing, while destroying locks and the embankment of the James River Canal, railroads and Confederate supplies. It arrived at White House Landing on 17 March, taking part in a sharp engagement that day.

The 1st Cavalry was then present in all the major battles of the Cavalry Corps until the close of the war. On 30 March, it was in the engagement on White Oak Road; on 31 March, at Dinwiddie Court House; on 1 April, at Five Forks. There, the regiment charged an entrenched enemy position, carried it and seized 200 prisoners. It also fought on 2 April in the engagement near the Southside Railroad; on 6 April, at the Battle of Sayler's Creek; and on 9 April, at Appomattox Courthouse, the surrender of the Army of Northern Virginia.

The regiment then returned to Petersburg, where it remained in camp until 24 April, when it marched with the Cavalry Corps towards North Carolina for the proposed junction with Sherman. On the surrender of Joseph E. Johnston's army, the Cavalry Corps returned to Petersburg and the regiment, escorting General Sheridan, left for Washington on 8 May, arriving on 16 May and taking part in the Grand Review of the Armies.

== Return to frontier ==
Later that month, the regiment was ordered to Louisiana, arriving at New Orleans on 31 May and remaining there until 29 December, when it embarked for California via the Isthmus of Panama. It was stationed at the Presidio of San Francisco on 22 January, with Companies A, G and K going on 5 February to Drum Barracks, where Companies C, D and E, followed them on 17 February, Company L going to Sacramento. In June, regimental headquarters went to Fort Vancouver and the several companies were distributed through Oregon, Washington Territory, Idaho, California, Nevada and Arizona, no two being at the same station.

=== Snake War ===
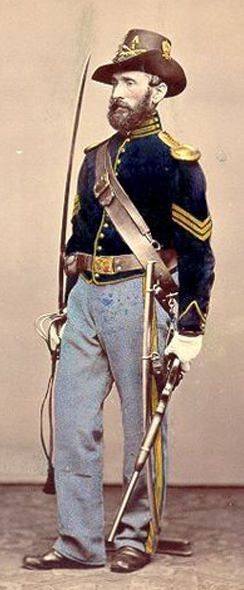
1866 picture of model showing correct uniform of a Company "A" 1st US Cavalry SGT wearing Hardee hat

From 1866 to 1871, various companies from the 1st Cavalry Regiment were involved in numerous skirmishes involving Indians during the American Indian Wars throughout the west. From 1866 to 1868, they operated in Oregon, Idaho Territory, Nevada, and California fighting the Snake War. Although not defined by one large battle, this series of guerrilla skirmishes and frontier clashes across the high-desert sagebrush plains would be the deadliest Indian War in the West, with 1,762 fatalities. These skirmishes included an expedition from Fort Bidwell, California, during 22–29 October 1866, when Company A killed 14 Indians, three women, four children, and captured an entire camp. Later that year, LTC George Crook led an expedition of one company of the 1st Cavalry to pursue the Indians in their winter quarters. On 26 December 1866, at the Battle of Owyhee River in Malheur County, Oregon Crook's men caught the Paiutes asleep in their camp. However, after the first shots were fired, Chief Howluck determined to stay and fight. The native warriors taunted the soldiers, who returned a deadly accurate fire on the warriors. Quickly into the fighting almost every mounted warrior was shot down. The rest sought refuge behind rocks, remaining there until mid-day when they retreated. Continuing his pursuit Crook again encountered the Chief Paulina's Paiute village at Steen's Mountain (named after an early officer of the 1st Dragoons). As Crook ordered the charge his horse bolted and carried him through the native village. Nevertheless, his men followed. Despite several close calls for Crook personally, his troopers' fire was accurate and inflicted heavy casualties. A month later Crook's men engaged in one final skirmish before Crook ended the expedition due to bad weather.

On the nights of 7–8 February 1867, 25 men of Company B on a patrol were attacked by hostile Indians near Vicksburg Mines in Nevada. On 5 April 1868, Company F killed 32 Indians and captured two near Malheur River, Oregon. Following the Indians south into California, Crook's 1st Cavalry troopers, along with infantrymen from the 23rd Infantry Regiment and 15 Warm Springs and Shoshone scouts encountered a large band of them in an entrenched position. The Native American warriors had made a fortress out of lava rocks in the Infernal Caverns of northern California near the town of Likely. From there they were able to pour a steady fire upon the soldiers commanded by Lt. Col. George Crook. Crook's men attacked on the second day. Despite heavy casualties they managed to scale the cliffs and take the fortifications. Colonel Crook reportedly shot down Chief Sieto himself. Fighting continued into the night as the Native warriors withdrew deeper into the caverns. Crook commented "I never wanted dynamite so bad as I did when we first took the fort and heard the diabolical and defiant yells from down in the rocks". On the third day the Natives had fled the caverns.

=== 1866–1871 ===
They also fought in the Apache Wars in Arizona Territory from 1866 to 1872. On 29 January 1867, Company M encountered a band of 90 warriors at Stein's Mountain in New Mexico Territory; 60 Indians were killed and 27 captured. From 26 to 31 May 1868, eight men of Company M killed 34 Indians. At Fort McDowell in Arizona on 9–11 December 1869, 20 men from Company E killed an entire band of 11 Mojave Apaches.

On 15 December 1870, Colonel Blake was retired from active service on his own application, and Colonel Alvan C. Gillem of the 11th Infantry was transferred to the First Cavalry in his stead.

=== Modoc War of 1872–1873 ===
The Modoc Indians were a small tribe whose territory straddled the present-day south-central Oregon/northeast California border and encompassed Tule Lake and Lost River. Through the intercession of interested civilians, orders were issued for the Modocs' removal to the Klamath Reservation. They went on the reservation, but, on account of ill treatment, a small group of approximately 150-200 left. The War Department was then directed to enforce the orders. The US Army stationed at nearby Fort Klamath at once commenced hostilities and one of the most protracted, expensive, and obstinate Indian wars of later years followed.

Under command of Capt. Jackson, Troop B left Fort Klamath, on 28 November 1872, for the purpose of returning the group of Modocs to the reservation. At daylight on 29 November, the troops surprised the Modoc men, women, and children in their camps on Lost River. Witnessing the troops form a skirmish line, the Modocs denied Jackson's demand to see Keintpoos and an engagement followed in which three Modocs were killed and three wounded. The company lost three men killed and seven wounded, two of them mortally. The company then went into camp at Crawley's Ranch on Lost River opposite the Modocs' camps while the Modocs fled to the lava beds on the southern shore of then Tule Lake.

Troop G from Fort Bidwell took station on 13 December at Land's Ranch on the eastern shore of Tule Lake. The Modocs attacked this camp on 21 December and were repulsed, but not until two men and five horses had been killed. Troop B now joined Troop G and the two companies moved their camp to the top of the bluff overlooking the southwestern shore of Tule Lake on 16 January 1873 in conjunction with General Wheaton's column, with which Troop F and a detachment of Troop H were also serving at this time. The first general engagement took place on 17 January, and lasted from 7:30 am to 9:30 pm, when the troops retired, going finally into camp at Applegate's Ranch near Clear Lake. The regiment lost nine men killed; eight men and two officers (Captain Perry and 2nd Lieutenant Kyle) were wounded.

The Modocs attacked a wagon train on 22 January, driving away the escort. However, Captain Reuben F. Bernard, 1st Cavalry, came up with reinforcements and the Modocs were repulsed, losing one killed and many wounded. Troop K from Fort Halleck, Nev., joined the battalion on 18 February. The battalion now consisted of Troops B, F, G, and K under Major Biddle (who was promoted to 6th Cavalry during this campaign). Colonel Gillem, 1st Cavalry, was commanding the expedition, and the Troop H detachment joined the column on 10 February.

During the night of 14 April, the troops of the 1st Cavalry moved with the rest of the command to invest the Modoc stronghold, and in the Second Battle of the Stronghold, 15–17 April, succeeded in cutting off the Modoc defenders' access to Tule Lake, their only source of water. During the night of the 16th, the Modoc abandoned their position and disappeared into the vast lava beds to the south. The 1st Cavalry lost two men killed and two wounded. On April 21, Col. Gillem was relieved of duty and replaced by Col. Jefferson Davis, 23rd Infantry, on May 2.

On 10 May, Troops B and G were attacked at Sorass Lake (present-day Dry Lake) but repulsed the Modocs with the loss of one Modoc killed and two wounded. The command lost one killed and six wounded, two of them mortally. On 12 May, Troops B and G, as part of a larger force under command of Capt. Hasbrouck, came upon the Modocs, who fled towards the west. The troops followed the trail and on 22 May, 70 Modocs surrendered. "Boston Charlie" was captured on 29 May and on 31 May, "Schonchin John", "Scarfaced Charlie", and 27 other Modocs surrendered.

Troops F and H were sent from Applegate's Ranch on 31 May to follow up on those Modocs who still remained at large, finding them on 1 June, when the whole party surrendered. With the capture of "Captain Jack", the Modoc war ended, and by the end of June the companies that had been engaged in it had returned to their proper stations.

The troops left in Arizona were moved north and by the end of October 1873, headquarters with Troops A and D were at Benicia Barracks; B at Fort Klamath; C at Camp McDermitt, Nev.; E at Fort Lapwai, Idaho Territory; F, L, and M at Fort Walla Walla, Wyoming Territory; G at Camp Bidwell, California.; H and K at Camp Harney, Oregon.; and I at Camp Halleck, Nevada.

Colonel Gillem died at his residence in Nashville, Tenn., 2 December 1875, and was succeeded by Colonel Cuvier Grover, promoted from the 3rd Cavalry.

=== 1877 Nez Perce War ===
On 15 June 1877, Companies F and H, under Captain Perry, were ordered to proceed to Camas Prairie to the assistance of the settlers of Mount Idaho, I. T., who were threatened by the Nez Percé Indians under Chief Joseph. Learning that the Indians were crossing Salmon River and could be taken at a disadvantage, the march was given that direction and Chief Joseph's camp was found and taken by surprise, but the Indians quickly rallied and repulsed the troops with severe loss, Lieutenant E. W. Theller, 21st Infantry (attached), and 33 men being killed and two wounded.

All the companies of the regiment, except M at Fort Colville and A at Camp Harney watching the Piutes, were now ordered into the field against the Nez Percés. Companies E and L joined General Howard's command on 21 June; and on 1 July they surprised and attacked the camp of "Looking Glass" on the Clearwater, I. T. The village was entirely destroyed, several Indians killed and about 1,000 ponies captured. On 2 July, the same command attempted to form a junction with Company F, which was on its way from Lapwai. On 3 July, the Indians ambushed the advanced guard, consisting of Lieutenant S. M. Rains, ten men of the battalion and two civilian scouts, killing them all, and were then found to be in such force and so strongly posted that it was considered imprudent to attack them. The junction with Company F was effected, however, on 4 July, and the same afternoon the Indians attacked, the fight lasting until sunset. The battalion (E, F and L) joined General Howard at Grangerville, on 8 July. Company H had joined on 2 July, and the battalion was commanded by Captain David Perry.

On 11 July, General Howard crossed the Clearwater with his whole command and moved down that stream with Company H in advance. The Indian camp was discovered and at once attacked, the fight lasting two days and ending with the retreat of the Indians. Company B joined in time to take part in the fight on 12 July. The regiment lost three men killed and four wounded. The battalion made a reconnaissance on 18 July of the Lo-Lo trail, and the Indian scouts accompanying it were ambushed and met with considerable loss. One Nez Percé was killed.

Major Sanford's battalion, consisting of Companies C, D, I and K, joined General Howard on the Clearwater, on 28 July, and the expedition across the Lo-Lo trail began on 30 July. Companies B, C, I and K, under Major Sanford, accompanied it, and Companies D, E, G and L, with other troops under Major Green, constituted the "Reserve Column", which remained at Camas Prairie until 5 August, when it moved near to Mount Idaho, and established a permanent camp called Camp Howard. Companies F and H were stationed at Fort Lapwai.

In the Indian attack at Camas Creek on 20 August, Companies B and L were engaged, losing one man killed and one wounded. At Judith Basin, the battalion was detached from General Howard's command and directed to return, and all the companies had reached their stations by the end of November. Company K and a detachment of C, attached to General Sturgis' command, took part in the engagement with the Nez Percés at Canyon Creek, Montana, on 13 September 1877.

=== 1878 ===
At the outbreak of the Bannock War in May 1878, Company G was the first body of troops to reach the scene of hostilities, and Captain Bernard reported that the Indians numbered from 300 to 500. They were moving towards Steens Mountain (named after Enoch Steen, a former member of the regiment). The whole of the First Cavalry was at once ordered into the field and Colonel Grover sent to Fort Boise to take charge of operations there. Companies D, I and K, were with him. Companies F and L joined Company G on the Owyhee, 17 June, and the three companies reached Camp Harney on 21 June, where they were joined by Company A. These four companies were designated the "Left Column" by General Howard.

On the morning of 23 June, the Left Column struck the main camp of the hostiles on Silver Creek, and drove the Indians out of it and on to a cutbank, made by the creek, which had been prepared for defense. The action lasted into the night and in the morning it was found that the Indians had gone. Many Indians were killed and the camp was destroyed. The battalion lost two killed and three wounded. Company K joined the battalion on 27 June, and on 28 June the cavalry cut loose from the foot troops and pushed forward on the trail of the Indians. The fertile John Day Valley was saved in great part by this vigorous pursuit, and on 5 July General Howard overtook the command, arriving with it at Pilot Rock on 7 July. Here, it was joined by Companies E and H. The Indian camp was located and at sunrise on 8 July Captain Bernard moved his battalion to the attack.

About 300 Indians occupied the crest of the high and steep hills near Birch Creek, and were at once attacked. Captain Bernard fought his cavalry on foot without separating the men from the horses. All the companies, except A with the pack train, were deployed and used in the engagement, and the Indians were driven from three successive positions and finally four or five miles further into the mountains. Four men were wounded, one mortally, and probably 20 horses were killed. The enemy's loss is unknown; their women, children and best horses were sent off, seemingly towards the Grande Ronde, before the action began.

Lieutenant C. E. S. Wood, A. D. C., wrote: "The entire fight was closely watched by the general commanding, who desires to express his opinion that no troops ever behaved better or in a more soldierly manner than did the officers and men engaged in this encounter." The command camped for the night among the rough cañons adjacent to the battle-field.

Captain Bernard was then ordered to take his command, except Company K, to Fort Walla Walla to refit. Company K was sent to join the infantry column and with it moved to the Umatilla Agency, near which the hostiles were reported to be. Here the Indians attacked on 13 July. In the ensuing fight, Company K held the right of the line and took part in the final charge by which the Indians were driven off the field and for three miles into the hills. At the request of the Indian Agent, the command moved back to the agency that night, but two days later seven dead Indians were counted upon the battle-field.

Companies A, E, F, G, H and I, now under Lieutenant-Colonel J. W. Forsyth, 1st Cavalry, left Fort Walla Walla on 13 July – the day of the fight at Umatilla Agency – in search of the Indians, who were found to be travelling in the direction of John Day River. On 20 July, Forsyth's scouts were ambushed, which caused a halt and deployment of the command, but when the line moved forward the Indians had gone. On 22 July, the battalion reached 11 Burnt Meadows, where it was joined by Companies D and I, under Major Sanford, and on 27 July it went into camp at Malheur Agency to await supplies. The hostiles had now split up into many small parties, which were followed up and nearly all ultimately captured.

During the months of September and October, the companies were sent to their permanent stations, and the return for 30 November shows Companies A and E at Camp Harney, Oregon; B, D, F, K and M, at Fort Walla Walla, W. T.; C at Camp Bidwell, California; G at Fort Boise, L T.; H at Fort Colville, W. T.; I at Camp Halleck, Nevada, and L at Fort Klamath, Oregon.

=== 1881 ===
In 1881, Companies C, G, I and M were sent to Arizona, and on 2 October, Company G, with other troops, was in action near Cedar Springs against Apaches. The hostiles fought with great boldness and desperation and the fight lasted until 9 P. M., when the Indians escaped. Company G had two men wounded and 12 horses killed. On 4 October, Companies G and I had a running fight near South Pass of the Dragoon Mountains, in which the hostiles were followed into Sonora, Mexico.

In October 1881, the "companies" began to be designated "troops" on the Regimental Return. Troop G returned to Fort McDermott on 9 November; Troop I to Camp Halleck on 27 December; Troop M to the Presidio of San Francisco on 20 January 1882; and Troop C to Fort Bidwell on 16 April.

=== 1884–87 ===
In June 1884, the regiment was transferred to the Department of Dakota, after a tour of nearly 30 years on the Pacific coast, during the greater part of which time its stations were remote from civilization and its duties of a most arduous and thankless character. On 5 June 1885, Colonel Grover died at Atlantic City, New Jersey and was succeeded by Colonel N. A. M. Dudley, promoted from the 9th Cavalry.

During this time, the headquarters and troops D, G, I, K and M, went to Fort Custer; A, C and F went to Fort Maginnis; E to Fort Ellis; H and L to Fort Assinniboine; and B to Fort Keogh.

From 1886 to 1918, Company M, 1st Cavalry was stationed at Fort Yellowstone.

Conflict with the "Crows" came in the fall of 1887, and on the morning of 4 November, Colonel Dudley left Fort Custer with Troops A, B, D, E, G and K, and Company B, 3d Infantry, with a section of Hotchkiss guns, to arrest "Sword Bearer" and the Indians who had fired into the agency buildings on the night of 30 September.

On 5 November, a demand was made upon the Indians for the surrender of these men, and they were given an hour and a half to comply with the demand. At the end of that time, the battalion of the 1st Cavalry, with Moylan's troop of the 7th Cavalry on the right, moved out in front of camp. At the same time, a 'great commotion was observed in the Indian camp, and "Sword Bearer" and another chief dashed out leading from 120 to 150 warriors equipped for battle. The Indians charged, but were repulsed and fell back into the timber alongside the river, where they had dug many rifle pits from which they now kept up a constant fire. This fire was returned, and "Sword Bearer" was seen to fall, whereupon all fighting quickly ceased. All the Indians whose surrender had been demanded and who had not been killed were at once brought in and delivered to the Department Commander, who sent them to Fort Snelling. The cavalry battalion returned to Fort Custer on 13 November.

=== 1889–1892 ===
Colonel Dudley was retired from active service on 20 August 1889, and was succeeded by Colonel J. S. Brisbin, promoted from the 9th Cavalry. On 31 December, Headquarters and Troops B, D, E, G and M, were at Fort Custer; A and L at Fort Maginnis; C, F and H at Fort Assinniboine; I at Fort Leavenworth; and K at Camp Sheridan, Wyoming.

In April 1890, the Cheyennes assumed a threatening attitude and their agent called on the commanding officer of Fort Custer for protection, who sent Major Carrol with Troops B, D and M to the Tongue River Agency, where they established Camp Crook. In September, a white boy was murdered by "Head Chief" and "Young Mule", and every attempt to arrest the murderers failed. On 11 April, the Indians sent word that they would attack the agency and on 12 April made their appearance on a hill commanding the agency buildings, where they opened fire upon them. They were soon dislodged and killed. The regiment took part in the operations against the hostile Sioux in the winter of 1890–1891, but was not brought into actual contact with them.

In December 1890, word having been received that a troop of cavalry was surrounded by hostile Indians at or near Cave Hills, Montana, Troop A made one of the most remarkable marches on record in going to its relief. It marched 186 miles, 95 of which were made in 25 hours, and 170 in 53 1/2 hours. The report that caused such tremendous exertion proved to be without foundation.

On 22 April 1891, Colonel Brisbin was transferred to the 8th Cavalry with Colonel Abraham K. Arnold who had been the lieutenant colonel and now became the colonel of the First. In 1892, the regiment was transferred to the Department of Arizona, relieving the 10th Cavalry. Headquarters and Troops C, E, F, H and K, going to Fort Grant, Arizona.; B and I to Fort Bayard, New Mexico; D to Fort Apache, Arizona; and G to San Carlos. Troop A was at Fort Myer, Virginia, and was not moved.

==== Medals of Honor During the Indian Wars ====
Owing to the vast extent of country guarded by the regiment, its service for many years following was very arduous. Scouting for Indians and escort duty of various kinds were incessant. During this period, 30 soldiers and officers serving with the regiment earned the Medal of Honor. Eighteen of these awards were for a single engagement against Apaches in the Chiricahua Mountains of Arizona, and another six were for actions in George Crook's "winter campaign" of 1872–73. The recipients were:

===== Chiricahua Mountains, Arizona, 20 October 1869 =====
- Sergeant Frederick Jarvis, Company G
- Trumpeter Bartholomew T. Keenan, Company G
- Private Charles Kelley, Company G
- Corporal Nicholas Meaher, Company G
- Private Edward Murphy, Company G
- First Sergeant Francis Oliver, Company G
- Corporal Thomas Powers, Company G
- Private James Russell, Company G
- Private Theodore F. Smith, Company G
- Private Thomas Smith, Company G
- Private Thomas J. Smith, Company G
- Private William H. Smith, Company G
- Private George Springer, Company G
- Private Thomas Sullivan, Company G
- Private James Sumner, Company G
- Sergeant John Thompson, Company G
- Private Charles H. Ward, Company G
- Private Enoch R. Weiss, Company G

===== Arizona, winter of 1872–73 =====
- First Sergeant James Blair, Company I
- Sergeant Lehmann Hinemann, Company L
- Private James W. Huff, Company L
- Sergeant Henry J. Hyde, Company M
- Private Moses Orr, Company A
- Sergeant William Osborn, Company M

===== Other campaigns =====
- First Sergeant Richard Barrett, Company A (Sycamore Canyon, Arizona, 23 May 1872)
- Major John Green (Lava Beds, California, 17 January 1873)
- Bugler Samuel Hoover, Company A (Santa Maria Mountains, Arizona, 6 May 1873)
- Captain James Jackson (Camas Meadows, Idaho, 20 August 1877)
- First Sergeant Michael McCarthy, Company H (White Bird Canyon, Idaho, 1876–1877)
- First Lieutenant William R. Parnell (White Bird Canyon, Idaho, 17 June 1877)

== Spanish–American War ==
In 1898, the US turned its interests to an island in the Caribbean; Cuba, which was owned by the Spanish Empire. After the USS Maine exploded in Havana Harbor, the fires of war brewed and the 1st Cavalry was moved to Chickamauga Park, Tennessee on 24 April 1898. The 1st Cavalry and the 10th Cavalry were formed into a cavalry brigade and shipped out to Cuba from Tampa, Florida. However, due to the limited space aboard the SS Leona, the troopers were forced to leave their horses behind. They fought in the Battle of Las Guasimas on 24 June, and at the Battle of San Juan Hill from 1–3 July. During the Siege of Santiago, the 1st Cavalry Regiment earned its 61st battle honor. The 1st Cavalry remained in Santiago until 8 August, and returned to the US where they were garrisoned at Fort Riley, Kansas, then later at Fort Robinson, Nebraska.

== The Philippines and Border Duty ==
On 19 June 1899, the 1st Cavalry left Ft Robinson for Fort D.A. Russell, Wyoming and began thorough training for new recruits after a brief reorganization period. When the Boxer Rebellion began in China in August 1899, the US Army garrison in the Philippines was moved to Peking to relieve the surrounded legations there, and the 1st Cavalry was sent to the Philippines on 7 August, their horses following four days later. Arriving at Batangas, Luzon on 20 September, they moved to Santo Tomas just south of Manila. They busied themselves with scouting missions, escorting supplies, and patrolling the countryside and villages for guerrilla fighters.

In October 1901, a group of insurgents stole some native supplies, so 20 troopers pursued them, reclaimed the goods, and burned the village they were found in, and on 22 October, Troop B captured 5 guerrillas on Mount Makiling. From 18 November-1 December, 35 troopers from the 1st Cavalry took part in the Mount San Cristobal Expedition, which destroyed an enemy supply cache. On 15 March 1902, Troop B killed 5 insurgents on Mount Makiling, and killed 4 more on 19 March. On 16 April, the leader of these guerrillas, General Malvar, surrendered, and hostilities ceased. The 1st Cavalry Regiment was sent back home, and arrived at their new post, Fort Clark, Texas, on 1 October 1903, where they remained for three years. After the 1906 San Francisco earthquake, 1st Cavalry troopers moved there to assist, and Troop B remained in San Francisco until 9 June 1907 before returning to Texas.

The 1st Cavalry Regiment returned to the Philippines in 1908 and garrisoned Fort Stotsenburg for two years. This deployment was much quieter than their last one, and the regiment returned home on 12 February 1910. A, B, D, and K Troops were stationed at the Presidio of San Francisco and later joined the rest of their regiment at the Presidio of Monterey until 1 August 1914. Moving to Southern California, the 1st Cavalry garrisoned San Ysidro in response to growing tensions south of the border in Mexico. On 24 August 1915, the regiment moved to Calexico, California to strengthen the border and defend against raids by the bandito, Pancho Villa. They remained guarding the border while General Pershing launched the Punitive Expedition and were still there when the US entered World War I. The 1st Cavalry did not participate in the First World War, but it remained guarding the border until 19 January 1923, when they went to Fort D. A. Russell, Texas. This was their last posting as horse cavalry, and during a parade on 14 December 1932, the troopers dismounted and passed in review, saluting their horses as they left them to become a mechanized unit. Moving to Fort Knox, Kentucky, the 1st Cavalry Regiment became the first mechanized unit in the United States Army, and was brigaded with the 13th Cavalry Regiment to form the 7th Cavalry Brigade (Mecz). In the summer of 1939, 7th Cavalry Brigade (Mecz) took part in the Plattsburgh Maneuvers and helped develop the Army's first tactics for mechanized warfare. In the summer of 1940, the Louisiana Maneuvers convinced the Army of the need to form an armored force and the 1st Armored Division was founded on 15 July 1940. The 1st Cavalry Regiment was redesignated the 1st Armored Regiment that same day, and was assigned to the 1st Armored Brigade. It would not be long until America's fledgling armored force would be tested in battle.

== World War II ==
The 1st Armored Division was one of the first American units to sail across the Atlantic to do battle with the Axis. Leaving from Fort Dix, New Jersey on 11 April 1942, the division set foot on European soil in Northern Ireland on 16 May 1942. Here, they trained to go into battle for the first time. At the start of World War II, 1st Armor was broken up into three Battalions. 1st Battalion consisted of M3 Stuart light tanks, and 2nd and 3rd Battalions consisted of M3 Lee medium tanks.

=== Algeria-French Morocco ===
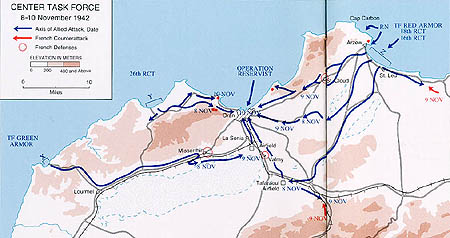
Map showing the movements of the Center Task Force in Operation Torch. Task Force Red can be seen landing east of Oran and driving south to the Tafaraoui airdrome.

On 8 November 1942, almost a full year after the attack on Pearl Harbor, the Allied American, Free French, and British armies launched Operation Torch, the seaborne invasion of French North Africa. The landing craft available at the time were unable to take the larger M3 Lee tanks, so all the Allied armored support for the initial landings would have to come from the lighter M3 Stuart tanks of 1st Battalion-1st Armored Regiment under the command of LTC John K. Waters (General Patton's son-in-law). 1-1 Armor was assigned to Task Force (TF) Red under the command of General Lunsford E. Oliver, with the objective of landing east of Oran at Z Beach in the Gulf of Arzew and forming a flying column to push south and seize the Tafaraoui airdrome.

Early on the morning of 8 November, the tanks of 1-1 Armor landed and had rapidly driven south, reaching Tafaraoui airdrome at 1100 where they received their first enemy fire in WWII. Vichy French anti-tank guns fired on the column but were quickly outflanked and neutralized by B and A companies. The column secured the area and set up roadblocks as the 1st Armored Regiment's Reconnaissance Platoon mopped-up machine-gun nests and snipers in the area, capturing approximately 300 prisoners in doing so. By the end of D-Day, Tafaraoui airdrome was being used by American aircraft. Task Force Green, to the west of Oran, was running into difficulty seizing La Senia airfield, so A Company, 1-1 Armor was sent to assist them.

In the afternoon of 9 November, the regiment's first tank-on-tank action was fought when French tanks attacked to retake Tafaraoui airdrome. The reconnaissance platoon spotted the French tanks at St. Lucien, east of the airdrome, and B Company and a Tank Destroyer company quickly deployed against them. 1st and 2nd Platoons advanced across the open desert in two Vs abreast while 3rd Platoon provided fire support. Despite their light armor and weaponry, they knocked out 14 French R35 tanks for the loss of 1 NCO killed, and 1 tank temporarily damaged.

The next day, American forces were prepared to push into Oran. A Co, 1-1 Armor (now attached to TF Green) moved toward the city from the southwest while TF Red moved in from the southeast. They soon came under fire from French anti-tank guns in Valmy (south of Oran), and C Co, 1-1 Armor was sent to destroy them. The tanks of TF Red did not have time to refuel after the long drive from Tafaraoui, so several ran out of fuel in the middle of the city of Oran, but infantrymen from the 1st Infantry Division were close behind, and they managed to secure the city by 1215.

At this point, many of the Vichy French soldiers joined the Free French and the Allied cause, and the Vichy government was dissolved by the Germans.

=== Tunisia ===
After Vichy French forces ceased resistance to the Allied landings of Operation Torch, the 1st Armored Division pushed east into Tunisia. The German-Italian Panzer Army was battle-hardened from fighting the British and Free French armies in the North Africa campaign for several years. Despite this, the tanks of 1-1 Armor advanced rapidly eastward towards Tunis on 25 November 1942 with the objective of creating a "tank-infested area" southeast of Mateur near Chouigui Pass, and conducting reconnaissance of the pass toward Tebourba. C company went through the pass, B Co held the center of the pass, and A Co with Headquarters Co stayed at the western end. Before nightfall, two Italian Semovente da 47/32 self-propelled guns were destroyed by the Battalion's command tank section after they were spotting moving to the pass from Mateur. Soon after, the reconnaissance platoon spotted an enemy strongpoint at a farmhouse two miles down the road to Mateur. A Co attacked this position, and received a large concentration of small arms and anti-tank fire from the loopholed walls of the farmhouse. One M3 tank was lost, and their 37 mm guns had little effect on the enemy position, so the attackers retreated. Fifteen enemy aircraft soon appeared, strafing and divebombing A Co as they withdrew, killing one man and wounding a few others. When the air raid ended, it was revealed that one wounded man had been left behind; he was rescued in the night.

Meanwhile, to the east of the pass, C company ambushed and destroyed three enemy troop-carriers and captured a detachment of German motorcycle troops near the village of Chouigui. The enemy airfield at Djedeida could be seen in the distance, so C company bypassed Tebourba to the south through an olive grove and caught the enemy security force by surprise at Bathan Bridge. After wiping it out in a short firefight, they turned northeast and headed for the airfield. C company made an immediate attack; advancing line abreast and firing on the grounded aircraft, the M3 tanks destroyed twenty enemy planes, and only two managed to escape. Two Americans were killed and one tank and crew went missing before the company withdrew back to Chouigui.

On the night of 26 November, Thanksgiving Day, a detachment of the 190th Panzer Battalion advanced on the American positions at Chouigui Pass. 1st Battalion-1st Armored Regiment would be the first US armored unit to clash with a German armored unit. The American tanks were in hull-down positions and camouflaged with A Co and HQ Co west of the pass, B Co on the reverse slope of a ridge paralleling the road to the north, and C company in the pass itself. A Co spotted the advancing enemy tanks first, three or more Panzer IIIs and six Panzer IVs, the assault-gun platoon moved to intercept and delay them. After exchanging ineffective fire, they fired smoke shells and withdrew. A Co attacked from the west with twelve M3 Stuart tanks but lost six tanks to German 50 mm and 75 mm guns and withdrew but had distracted the Germans long enough for B Co to attack the enemy from the rear. B Co destroyed all six Mark IVs and one Mark III, forcing the remainder to retreat. To the north, enemy infantry was seen dismounting from a column of trucks, so the remaining tanks of A Co and B Co advanced on them and decimated this force, breaking down the farmhouse gates and eliminating its garrison. The enemy was defeated, but in the last stage of the battle A company's commander, Major Siglin, was killed by a shell passing through his turret. Overall, the light tanks and men of 1-1 Armor acquitted themselves well against the experienced Afrika Korps in their first engagement, but suffered heavy losses.

On 1 December 1942, German and Italian forces under General Wolfgang Fischer launched a major counterattack to retake Tebourba. Elements of the 10th Panzer Division attacked Chouigui village, where 1-1 Armor was still located, and forced the battalion to withdraw to the southeast into the olive groves near Tebourba. By nightfall, the force was split into two groups, but B and C companies had managed to evade detection and rejoin the rest of the battalion. By 4 December, the Axis forces had retaken Tebourba, and 1-1 Armor pulled back to join the Allied defensive line along the Medjerda River. On 10 December 1942, a German force attacked the section of the line occupied by 1-1 Armor just east of Furna. C company was forced to retreat after a heavy artillery barrage. At 1130, 29-35 enemy tanks attacked C Co's positions while Captain Barlow and LTC Waters were consulting with each other outside of their tanks. Three Panzers broke into the battalion rear area, turned, and destroyed five M3 Stuarts and five M3 halftracks, forcing 1-1 Armor to withdraw, and opening a hole in the Allied line. Combat Command B withdrew on the night of 10–11 December. During the withdrawal, 1-1 Armor became bogged down in thick mud and were forced to abandon many of their vehicles, and by the end of the day, the battalion's strength was only 17 tanks.

During the fighting in North Africa thus far, most of the 1st Armored Regiment (except 1st Battalion) was still in England, awaiting transport to the theater. While in England, the 2nd and 3rd Battalion received the M4 Sherman tank, an improvement over the outdated M3 Lee. These remaining battalions and the command group arrived in Algeria on 21 December, and on Christmas Eve, 1st Armored Regiment was complete again, with all three battalions reuniting southeast of Oran. On 8 January 1943, 1st Armored Regiment advanced east, but left 1-1 Armor in Oran to refit. LTC Waters was promoted to become the Regimental Executive Officer. In the Battle of Faid Pass on 30 Jan, 3rd battalion (less G Company) was attached to TF Stark and the 1st Armor Regimental Reconnaissance Company was attached to TF Kern. In the attack on the pass on 31 Jan, H/3-1 AR ran into a wall of dug-in German positions and lost nine tanks, throwing back TF Stark. TF Kern was repulsed as well, and the attack was temporarily called off.

=== Naples-Foggia ===
In November 1943, the 1st Armored Regiment, as a part of the 1st Armored Division, moved to Italy and fought in the Naples-Foggia Campaign, the Allied drive to Monte Cassino. The winter months in Italy were mired in mud and stalemate. The rains and stiff German resistance on river and mountain-top defensive lines halted Allied progress.

=== Anzio ===
In late January 1944, the 1st Armored Regiment landed in Anzio as part of the Allied operation to outflank the German Winter Line. The armored forces broke through the German encirclement on 24 May 1944 after heavy fighting.

=== Rome-Arno ===
After participating in the liberation of Rome on 5 June 1944, the 1st Armored Division was pulled off the frontline and reorganized under a new table of organization. The 1st Armored Regiment was redesignated as the 1st Tank Battalion.

=== North Apennines ===
The division was placed back onto the line and the 1st Tank Battalion steadily advanced north and crossed the Arno on 1 September. This river crossing was followed by bloody stalemate in the North Apennines, where the rough and cold terrain hindered tank operations.

=== Po Valley ===
Their final action in the Second World War was the Po Valley Campaign, where they fought from 21 to 26 April 1945. The 1st Tank Battalion was deactivated after VE Day.

== Post-War ==
When the Korean War began, the Army began re-mobilizing. 1st Battalion, 1st Armored Regiment was reactivated as the 1st Tank Battalion at Fort Hood, Texas and 2nd Battalion, 1st Armored Regiment was activated as the 100th Tank Battalion and trained until they were combined on 15 February 1957 at Fort Polk, Louisiana to reform the 1st Cavalry Regiment. Company A, 100th Tank Battalion, was inactivated at Polk on 15 February 1957, and then redesignated as HHC 4th Medium Tank Battalion, 1st Cavalry on 15 May 1958, concurrently assigned to the United States Military Academy and activated at West Point, New York. By 29 December 1966 it was redesignated 4th Squadron, 1st Cavalry.

== Vietnam ==
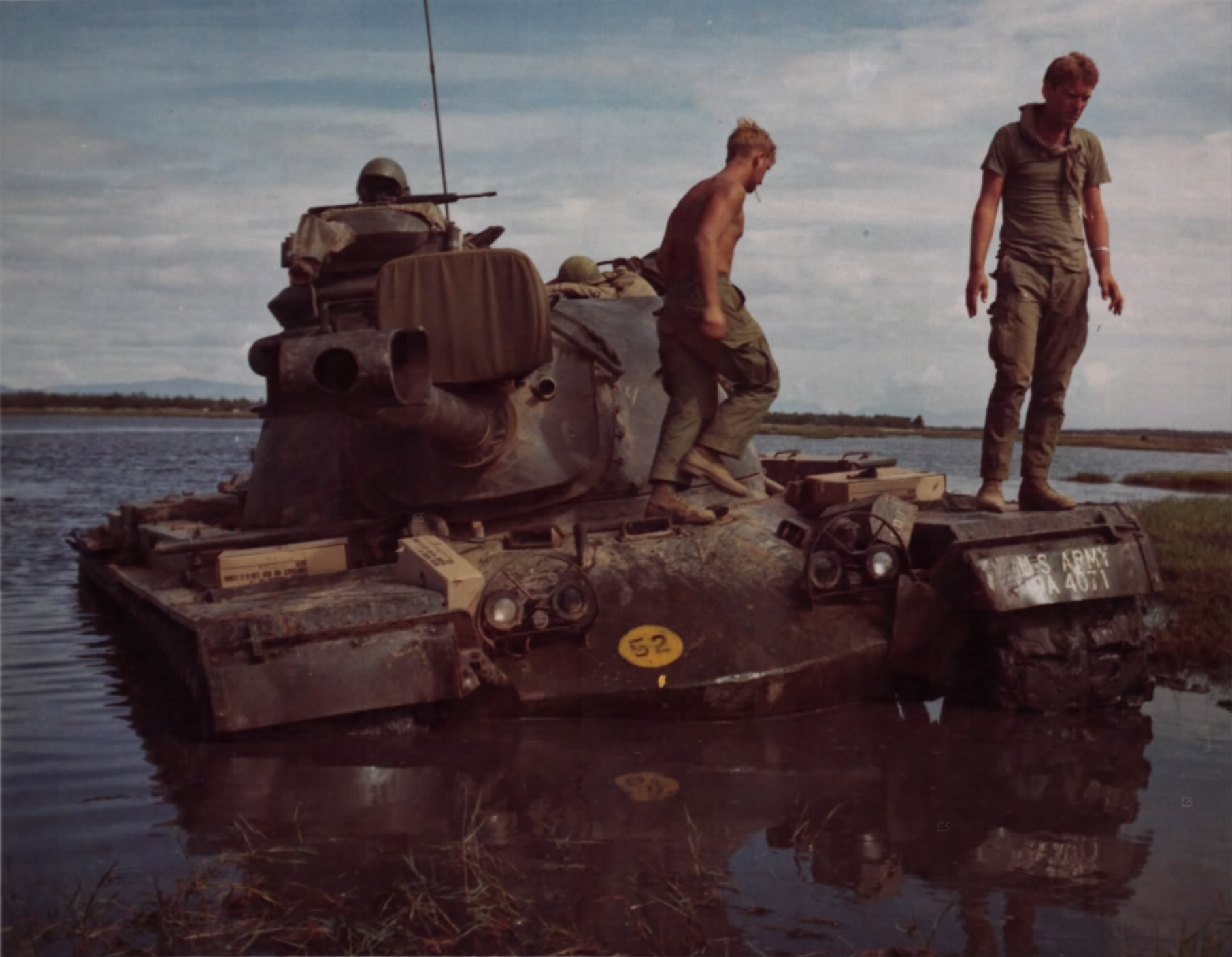
An M48 tank of "A" Troop, 1st Squadron, 1st Cavalry, is stuck in mud and water during an operation 15 km northeast of Hill 29, 2 August 1968

On 8 March 1965, US Marines landed at Da Nang, marking the beginning of the conventional American ground war in the country of South Vietnam. Aiming to eliminate the communist Viet Cong insurgents and their North Vietnamese Army backers, US military presence in the country steadily escalated. By 1967, roughly 485,600 American troops were in country, and the disparate Squadrons of the 1st Cavalry Regiment were soon to enter the fray.

=== 1st Squadron ===
In August 1967, the 1st Squadron, 1st Cavalry Regiment (1-1 Cavalry) was detached from the 1st Armored Division and sent to Vietnam attached to US Army Pacific. On deployment to Vietnam in 1967, the squadron consisted of three armored cavalry troops and one air cavalry troop, D Troop, which was not deployed until July 1968. 'D' Troop, 1st Squadron, 1st Cavalry Regiment was shipped to Vietnam with its aircraft to join its parent unit, which was already in Vietnam attached to the Americal Division at Chu Lai. En route, D Troop's orders were changed, temporarily attaching it to the 101st Airborne Division. The troop disembarked at Da Nang on 21 July 1968 and flew directly to Camp Eagle. The Troop then remained on combat duty in I Corps for the next four years and used the call sign Sabre. 1-1 Cavalry served in Chu Lai, Đà Nẵng, Tam Kỳ, and Thach Khe. On 15 April 1966 Troop E, 1st Cavalry was activated as the brigade reconnaissance troop of the 11th Infantry Brigade at Schofield Barracks, Hawaii. Troop E arrived in Vietnam on 19 December 1967 and participated in extensive ground combat in Quảng Ngãi and Quang Tin provinces through eleven campaigns, receiving the Republic of Vietnam Cross of Gallantry for service in 1969–1970 with the 11th Infantry Brigade of the 23rd Infantry Division (Americal). Troop E was inactivated in Vietnam on 13 November 1971. They departed Vietnam on 10 May 1972.

=== 2nd Squadron ===
On 1 July 1963, the 2nd Squadron, 1st Cavalry was relieved of their duties to the 3rd Armored Division, United States Army, Europe and reassigned to the 2nd Armored Division at Fort Hood, Texas. On 8 August 1967, the unit left Fort Hood for Vietnam where they were attached to the 4th Infantry Division, headquartered in Pleiku. During their service in the Central Highlands, troopers saw action in Pleiku, Đắk Tô, Suoi Doi, Kon Tum, An Khê and many other nameless stretches of road and jungle. In May 1969, the squadron was transferred to Task Force South in Phan Thiết and was attached to the 1st Field Force, Vietnam. Now operating in the rice paddies and rubber plantations of Vietnam, the Blackhawks further distinguished themselves in actions around Phan Thiết, Song Mao, Phan Rang and their environs. 2-1 Cavalry departed Vietnam in October 1970, leaving Cam Ranh Bay for reassignment to the 2nd Armored Division at Fort Hood, Texas.

=== 7th Squadron ===
7th Squadron (Air), 1st Cavalry was a self-contained Vietnam-era air cavalry squadron, made up of five troops. Headquarters and Headquarters Troop (callsign Kingbird/Blackhawk), Alpha Troop (callsign Apache), Bravo Troop (callsign Dutch Master), Charlie Troop (callsign Sand Piper/Comanche) and Delta Troop (Powder Valley/Dragoon). D Troop (the squadron's armored cavalry troop) participated in successful night ambushes, escorted convoys, search and clear missions and other ground operations until the U.S. 9th Div was withdrawn from Vietnam. After that the offensive mission of D Troop was taken away and they were used to train the South Vietnamese Regional Force infantry units of the 44th Special Zone (STZ) in air assault missions, which were quite successful. The 44th STZ protected a region along the Cambodian border to the north. Troops A, B and C were Air Cavalry units. When the U.S. 9th Division was returned to the US, their Air Cavalry Troop, D/3 3-5th Cav, was added to the 7-1st Cav, bringing the number of Air Cavalry Troops to 4. This was the largest Air Cav Squadron in Vietnam. Equipped to perform scout, insertion, interdiction and attack missions, the troops supported the Army of the Republic of Vietnam (ARVN) 21st, 9th, 7th Divisions and the 44 STZ. The Squadron was initially attached to the 12th Aviation Group, then from 3 June 1968, to the 164th Aviation Group. In 1970, when President Nixon approved a US/ARVN assault into Cambodia, the squadron, with 4 Air Cav troops abreast formed the advanced guard for the 3 ARVN Divisions. After several weeks in Cambodia, all the units returned to the Delta where enemy activities dropped to an all-time low. In April 1972, 7-1 Cavalry was assigned to the 194th Armored Brigade, Fort Knox, Kentucky. In 1976, the unit was inactivated and used to form air cavalry troops in the reactivated 5th, 7th and 24th Infantry Divisions.

All US combat troops were withdrawn by 30 November 1972.

== Arctic Cavalry ==
On 31 December 1972, Troop E was reactivated as a separate air cavalry reconnaissance troop and assigned to the 172nd Infantry Brigade at Fort Wainwright, Alaska. It was inactivated on 15 March 1986. It was reactivated on 16 April 1998 as a ground reconnaissance troop at Fort Wainwright with the 172nd Infantry Brigade and inactivated on 15 November 2003. On 16 December 2006, Troop E, 1st Cavalry Regiment was reorganized, redesignated and activated as Headquarters and Headquarters Troop, 5th Squadron, 1st Cavalry Regiment (organic squadron elements concurrently constituted and activated) and assigned to the 1st Brigade Combat Team (Stryker), 25th Infantry Division at Fort Wainwright, Alaska.

== Cold War (1978–1991) ==
1st Squadron, 1st Cavalry Regiment returned to Europe and the 1st Armored Division, VII Corps taking up another frontier mission in December 1978 in the surveillance of the international "Iron Curtain" border between the Federal Republic of Germany and Czechoslovakia. As the "Eyes & Ears" of the 1st Armored Division based out of its garrison at O'Brien Barracks in Schwabach, FRG, the line troops (A – "Alpha", B "Bravo", C "Charlie") rotated on a 30 to 45-day cycle through 1-1 Cavlary's Border Camp Pitman in Weiden, FRG, between Field Training Exercises (FTX), Unit Gunnery Exercises and augmentations of other Border Cavalry Camps along the Inner German Border with East Germany and Czechoslovakia. During this border surveillance mission period the line troops were often typically deployed for around 9 to 10 Months each year participating in various FTX's, REFORGER's (Return of Forces to Germany), unit-gunnery exercises, border tours and augmentations.

In 1988 the squadron moved to Katterbach, FRG, and the unit eventually gained additional aviation elements to help support its mission. As part of the move and conversion from H-Series cavalry configuration to J-Series cavalry configuration, C Troop was dropped as a ground troop and became one of the new aviation troops (C & D) added.

== Gulf War and Balkans ==
When Sadaam Hussein's Iraq invaded Kuwait precipitating the Gulf War, the 1st Squadron, 1st Cavalry Regiment moved to Saudi Arabia from their bases in Germany and into the line by 8 January 1991. The 1st Armored Division was in a wedge for the advance forward, and 1-1 Cavalry was at the "sharp end" of the wedge. On 24 February, the 1st Cavalry led the way across the border and covered 244 kilometers in the enemy's rear during 89 hours of sustained combat operations. 1-1 Cavalry helped destroy 4 Iraqi divisions along the way, 3 of which were members of the vaunted Republican Guard. The squadron sustained no fatalities and a limited number of wounded, and only lost two M3A2 Bradley fighting vehicles.

1-1 Cavalry was involved in Operation Joint Endeavor beginning 20 December 1995 in the Balkans. A Troop 1-1 Cavalry was First Unit across the Sava River during the UN peacekeeping mission in Bosnia. The 1st Squadron returned to Büdingen, Germany on 17 November 1996.

Meanwhile, in New York State, by 1996 the 4th Squadron was listed among the Regular Army regiments, located at West Point, but as "inactive."

== War on Terror ==
In April 2003, 1st Squadron, 1st Cavalry and other regimentally affiliated units of the 1st Armored Division moved to Kuwait to begin staging for the Operation Iraqi Freedom. In March 2003, the Squadron conducted a Relief in Place of 3-7 Cavalry (3ID) in Baghdad and assumed operations. The Air Cavalry Troops of the Squadron (D, E, & F) were attached to 1st Battalion (Attack), 501st Aviation in order to provide reconnaissance and security to forces in and around the greater Baghdad area. Troop H, Brigade Reconnaissance Troop (a separate but regimentally affiliated unit) and the Squadron, along with infantry and reconnaissance elements from Co. A, 3rd Battalion, 124th Infantry, conducted reconnaissance and security operations in and around Baghdad for the next 16 months (due to an involuntary extension imposed on them two weeks prior to their scheduled flight home at the 12-month mark). The Air Cavalry Troops earned the Meritorious Unit Commendation medal, the Presidential Unit Citation, and the Valorous Unit Award for their contributions.

From March 2007 to May 2008, 3-1 Cavalry deployed with 3-3ID East of Bagdad at FOB Hammer in support of President Bush's "Surge".

From September 2008 to September 2009, 5-1 Cavalry was deployed to the eastern Diyala Governorate in Iraq.

From April 2011 to April 2012, 5-1 Cavalry deployed to Kandahar Province in Afghanistan in support of Operation Enduring Freedom.

In April 2012, 8-1 Cavalry deployed to Afghanistan with 2nd Stryker Brigade Combat Team, 2nd Infantry Division. Operations primarily took place throughout western and northern Kandahar Province. The squadron redeployed to Joint Base Lewis McChord in January 2013.

== Campaign participation credit ==
Mexican–American War

- Battle of Buena Vista
- Siege of Veracruz (Company F only)
- Battle of Cerro Gordo (Company F only)
- Battle of Contreras (Company F only)
- Battle of Molino del Rey (Company F only)
- Battle of Chapultepec (Company F only)
- Occupation of Coahuilla 1846
- Capture of Santa Fe 1846 (except Company E)
- Battle of San Pasqual 1846 (Company C only)
- Battle of Cañada 1847 (Except Company E)
- Battle of Embudo Pass 1847
- Battle of Rio San Gabriel 1847
- Battle of La Mesa 1847
- Siege of Pueblo de Taos 1847
- Battle of Santa Cruz de Rosales 1848 (Except Company E)

Indian Wars

- California 1846
- Comanche Wars 1847 (Company B only)
  - Love's Defeat 1847
- Nebraska 1849 (Company B only)
- Jicarilla War 1849
- Jicarilla War 1850
- Jicarilla War 1851
- Cayuse War 1851
- Yuma War 1852
- Cayuse War 1853
- Jicarilla War 1854
  - Battle of Cieneguilla 1854
- Comanche Wars 1855
- New Mexico 1855
- Rogue River War 1855
  - Battle of Hungry Hill
  - Battle of Big Bend 1856
- New Mexico 1856
- Arizona 1857
- Washington 1858
- Mohave War 1859
  - Battle of Beaver Lake 1859
- Arizona 1859
- California 1860
- Oregon 1860
- Arizona 1866
- Snake War 1866
  - Battle of Owyhee River
  - Battle of Steen's Mountain
  - Battle of Infernal Caverns
- Arizona 1867 (Company E only)
- Arizona 1868
- Oregon 1868
- California 1868
- Arizona 1869
- Arizona 1870
- Arizona 1871
- Arizona 1872 (Except Company B)
- Modoc War 1872
  - Battle of Lost River
  - First Battle of the Stronghold
  - Second Battle of the Stronghold
  - Battle of Dry Lake
- Sheepeater Indian War 1879 (Except Company E)
- Arizona 1881 (Except Company B)
- Crow War 1887
  - Battle of Crow Agency
- Apaches
- Nez Perce 1877
  - Battle of White Bird Canyon 1877
  - Battle of Cottonwood 1877
  - Battle of Canyon Creek 1877
- Bannock War 1878
- Pine Ridge

American Civil War

- Wilson's Creek 1861 (Company C and D)
- Peninsula Campaign
- Battle of Antietam (Except Company E)
- Battle of Fredericksburg
- Battle of Chancellorsville
- Battle of Gettysburg
- Battle of Wilderness
- Battle of Spotsylvania
- Battle of Cold Harbor
- Second Battle of Petersburg
- Battle of Valverde
- Battle of Appomattox

Spanish–American War

- Santiago

Philippine–American War

- Luzon 1901 (Except Company E)
- Luzon 1902 (Except Company E)

World War II

- Algeria-French Morocco (with arrowhead)
- Tunisia
- Naples-Foggia
- Anzio
- Rome-Arno
- North Apennines (Except Company E)
- Po Valley (Except Company E)

Vietnam

2nd Squadron, 1st Cavalry Regiment
- Counteroffensive, Phase III (Except Companies C, D, F, G and H)
- Tet Counteroffensive (Except Companies C. D, F and H)

7th Squadron, 1st Cavalry Regiment

- Tet Counteroffensive 1/30/68 – 1 April 1968
- Counteroffensive. Phase IV 2 April 1968 – 30 June 1968
- Counteroffensive, Phase V 1 July 1968 – 1 November 1968
- Counteroffensive, Phase VI 2 November 1968 – 22 February 1969
- Tet 69/Counteroffensive 23 February 1969 – 8 June 1969
- Summer-Fall 1969 9 June 1969 – 31 October 1969
- Winter-Spring 1970 1 November 1969 – 30 April 1970
- Sanctuary Counteroffensive 1 May 1970 – 30 June 1970
- Counteroffensive, Phase VII 1 July 1970 – 30 June 1971
- Consolidation I 1 July 1971 – 30 November 1971
- Consolidation II 1 December 1971 – 29 March 1972
- Cease-Fire 30 March 1972 – 28 January 1973

Gulf War

1st Squadron, 1st Cavalry Regiment

- Defense of Saudi Arabia
- Liberation and Defense of Kuwait

== Current status ==
- 1st Squadron is the armored reconnaissance squadron of the 2nd Brigade Combat Team, 1st Armored Division stationed at Fort Bliss, Texas.
- 2nd Squadron was the reconnaissance, surveillance and target acquisition squadron of the 1st Brigade Combat Team, 4th Infantry Division stationed at Fort Carson, Colorado. **Inactivated August 2024**
- 3rd Squadron was the reconnaissance, surveillance and target acquisition squadron of the 3rd Brigade Combat Team, 3rd Infantry Division (United States) and was deactivated 14 Dec 2015 at Fort Benning Georgia
- 4th Squadron was last assigned to the U.S. Military Academy, West Point, New York, in 1958, as the "Headquarters and Headquarters Company, 4th Medium Tank Battalion, 1st Cavalry" and was re-designated as "4-1 Cavalry" in 1966. The squadron was subsequently deactivated (listed as "inactive" 1996)
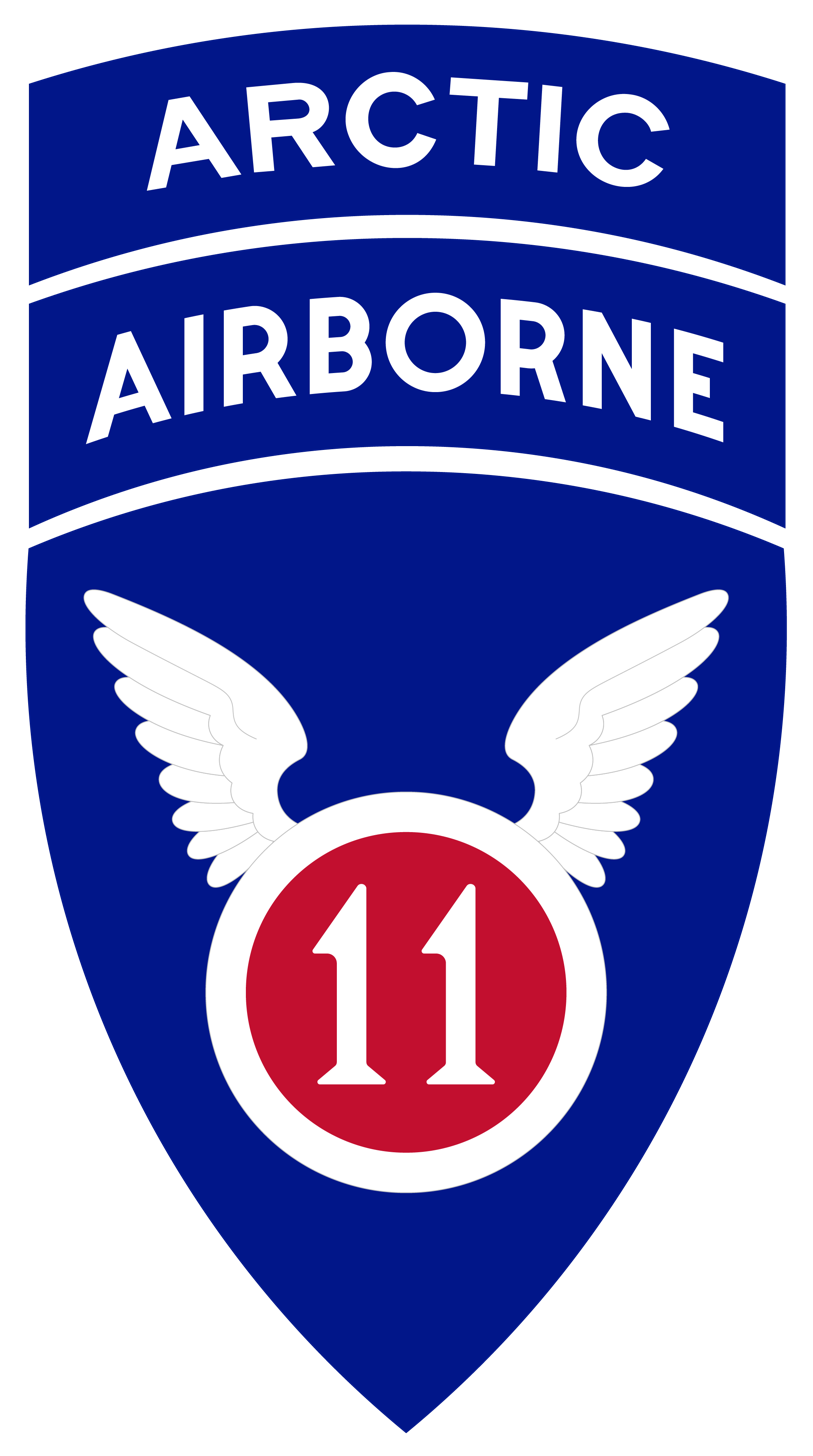
- 5th Squadron is the reconnaissance, surveillance and target acquisition squadron of the 1st Infantry Brigade Combat Team, 11th Airborne Division, stationed at Fort Wainwright, Alaska.
- 6th Squadron is the armored reconnaissance squadron of the 1st Brigade Combat Team, 1st Armored Division, stationed at Fort Bliss, Texas.
- 7th Squadron was a separate air cavalry squadron (reconnaissance, [battlefield] security, and "economy of force" squadron) assigned to the 194th Armored Brigade at Fort Knox, KY, until deactivated in 1976.
- 8th Squadron was the reconnaissance, surveillance and target acquisition squadron of the 2nd Brigade Combat Team, 2nd Infantry Division, stationed at Joint Base Lewis-McChord, Washington. It was deactivated 01 August 2024.

== Notable members ==
- John Buford
- Abraham Van Buren
- Jefferson Davis
- Richard S. Ewell
- William J. Hardee
- Guy H. Preston, commanded Camp Harry J. Jones and the 1st Cavalry Regiment from August 1919 to September 1920
- Jonathan M. Wainwright, IV

== Heraldic items ==
=== Coat of arms ===
- Blazon
  - Shield: Tenné (Dragoon Yellow), a dragon passant Or. (And for informal use the escutcheon encircled with a sword belt Sable buckled at base with the belt plate of the Dragoons of 1836 Proper bearing the regimental motto in base and "first Cavalry" in chief between two eight-pointed mullets of rays one on dexter side, the other on sinister, all Or).
  - Crest: On a wreath of the colors, Or and Tenné (Dragoon Yellow), a hawk rising with wings addorsed and elevated Sable, langued and membered Gules.
  - Motto: ANIMO ET FIDE (Courageous And Faithful).
- Symbolism
  - Shield: The color of the Dragoons was Dragoon yellow (orange-yellow), shown by the color of the shield and the dragon is in allusion to the name Dragoon. The gold eight-pointed star on the encircling belt was the insignia of the Dragoons until 1851.
  - Crest: This Regiment was organized in 1833 as the Regiment of United States Dragoons. Many of its officers and men came from the Battalion of Mounted Rangers which had taken part in the Black Hawk War.
- Background: The coat of arms was originally approved for the 1st Cavalry Regiment on 1 January 1921. It was amended to change the wording of the blazon and add the motto on 21 November 1923. It was redesignated for the 1st Armored Regiment on 7 September 1940. It was redesignated for the 1st Constabulary Squadron on 11 June 1947. The insignia was redesignated for the 1st Medium Tank Battalion on 13 August 1951. It was redesignated for the 1st Tank Battalion on 18 February 1955. The insignia was redesignated for the 1st Cavalry Regiment on 21 April 1958. It was amended to change the wording of the description on 23 June 1960. It was amended to correct the wording in the blazon of the shield on 20 October 1965.

=== Distinctive unit insignia ===
- Description: On a heraldic wreath Or and Tenné (Dragoon Yellow) a hawk rising with wings addorsed and elevated Sable and membered Gules—charged upon an eight-pointed Dragoon Yellow star surrounded by a Black sword belt bearing the organizational motto "Animo et Fide" with the old Dragoon belt plate of 1836. The insignia is 1 1/4 inches (3.18 cm) in diameter.
- Symbolism: This Regiment was organized in 1833 as the Regiment of United States Dragoons. Many of its officers and men came from the Battalion of Mounted Rangers which had taken part in the Black Hawk War. The color of the Dragoons was Dragoon yellow (orange-yellow) and a gold eight-pointed star on the encircling belt was the insignia of the Dragoons until 1851. The motto translates to "Courageous and Faithful."
- Background: The distinctive unit insignia was originally approved for the 1st Cavalry Regiment on 27 November 1923. It was redesignated for the 1st Armored Regiment on 7 September 1940. It was redesignated for the 1st Constabulary Squadron on 11 June 1947. The insignia was redesignated for the 1st Medium Tank Battalion on 13 August 1951. It was redesignated for the 1st Tank Battalion on 18 February 1955. The insignia was redesignated for the 1st Cavalry Regiment on 21 April 1958. It was amended to change the wording of the description on 20 October 1965.

== See also ==
- List of United States Regular Army Civil War units
