= Likely =

Likely may refer to:

- Probability
- Likelihood function
- Likely (surname)
- Likely, British Columbia, Canada, a community
- Likely, California, United States, a census-designated place
- Likely McBrien (1892–1956), leading Australian rules football administrator in the Victorian Football League
- In the nomenclature of political forecasting, a "likely" seat is one that is predicted, but not definitively, to probably be won by a particular political party

== See also ==
- Likely Airport (disambiguation)
