= Likely Airport =

Likely Airport may refer to:

- Likely Aerodrome (TC LID: CAX5), serving Likely, British Columbia, Canada
- Likely Airport, (FAA LID: 9CL3), Likely, California, United States
