= Thomas Sullivan (Medal of Honor, 1869) =

- U.S. Army Medal of Honor (1862–1895)
- Born: 1846 or 1847; Covington, Kentucky, US
- Military career
- Allegiance: United States
- Branch: United States Army
- Service years: 1868 – 1871
- Rank: Private
- Unit: 1st Cavalry Regiment
- Awards: Medal of Honor

Thomas Sullivan was a United States Army soldier who was awarded the Medal of Honor for his actions at the Chiricahua Mountains.

== Biography ==
Sullivan was born in 1846 or 1847 in Covington, Kentucky. He enlisted in the 1st Cavalry Regiment of the U.S. Army on June 20, 1868, in Cincinnati, Ohio; his U.S. Army enlistment record reflects an age of 21 (birth year 1846 or 1847)

On October 20, 1869, while serving with Company G, 1st Cavalry Regiment, Sullivan distinguished himself through gallantry in action against Indians concealed in a ravine on in action at Chiricahua Mountains, Arizona Territory.

Sullivan was discharged for disability on May 27, 1871, at Camp Bidwell, California.

== Medal of Honor citation ==
The President of the United States of America, in the name of Congress, takes pleasure in presenting the Medal of Honor to Private Thomas Sullivan, United States Army, for gallantry in action against Indians concealed in a ravine on 20 October 1869, while serving with Company G, 1st U.S. Cavalry, in action at Chiricahua Mountains, Arizona Territory.
