= Johnson's Ranch Raid =

- Part of Escobar Rebellion
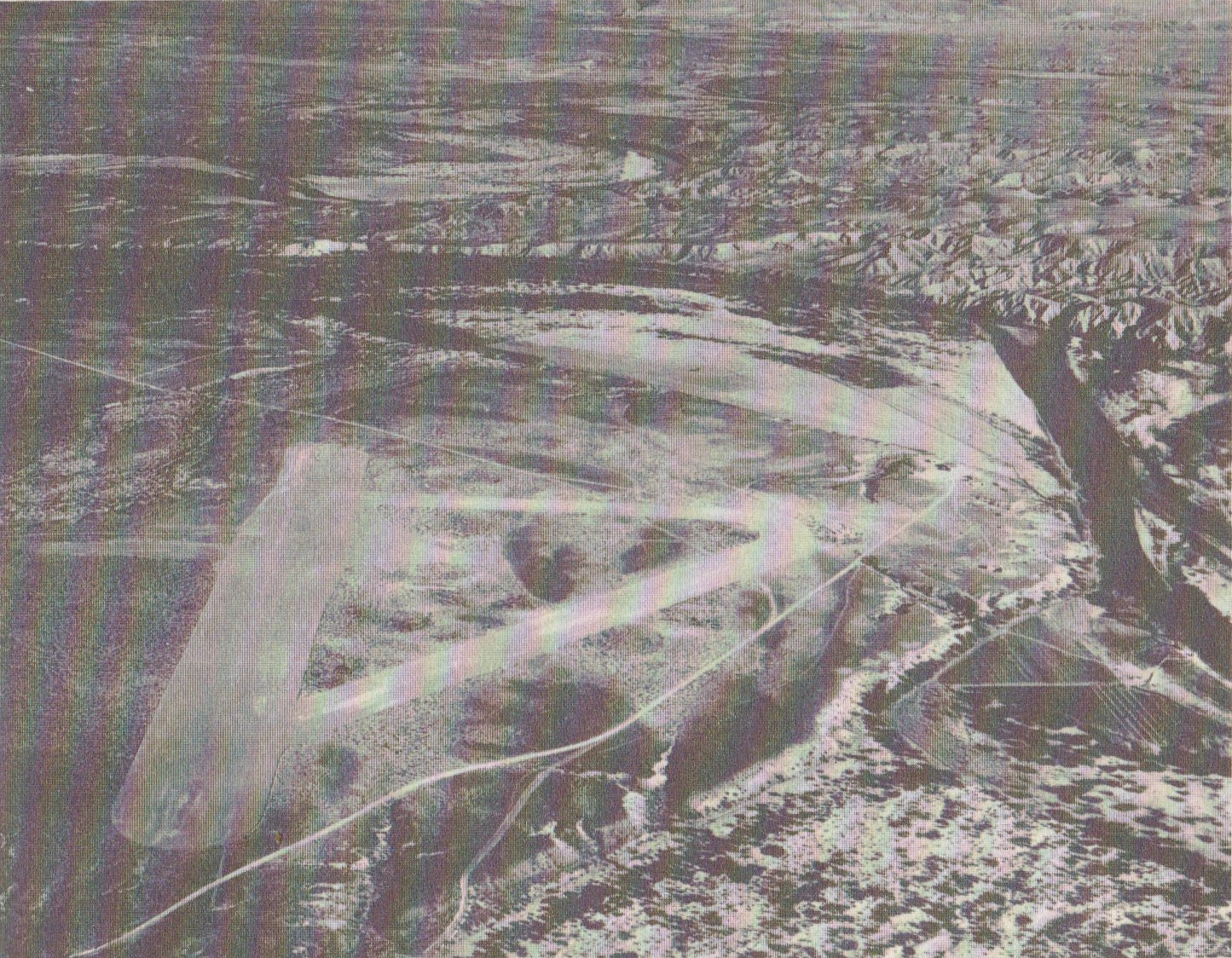
- Aerial view of Johnson's Ranch in 1932. The large cottonwood tree where the bandits assembled is visible at the far right, next to the river and adjacent to the ranch headquarters.
- Date: April 11, 1929
- Location: Big Bend, Texas, USA

The Johnson's Ranch Raid occurred on April 11, 1929, when Mexican bandits attacked the ranch of Elmo and Ada Johnson in the Big Bend region of West Texas.

== Background ==
In the spring of 1929, civil war was raging across Mexico with fighting in the central-west of the country between government forces of Emilio Portes Gil and the Cristero revolutionaries and fighting in the north between the federal government and the rebel forces of General José Gonzalo Escobar. Following the rebel defeat in the Battle of Jiménez on April 3, Escobar was in retreat and his men were deserting in large numbers. No longer having a war to fight, many of these deserters turned to banditry, and like in the decades before, saw the ranches on the American side of the international border as easy targets.

Elmo and Ada Johnson made a living raising livestock and operating a trading post that was open to people from both sides of the river. When they established the Johnson's Ranch in 1927, the Big Bend region was still one of the most remote areas of the United States. Apart from a few Mexican homes on the southern side of the Rio Grande, the Johnson family lived in almost complete isolation; the closest population center was in Alpine, Texas, 150 miles to the north. This made it the perfect target for Mexican bandits, who could easily cross the river and take whatever they wanted back to Mexico long before the United States Army or the Border Patrol could respond. There were no Mexican authorities in the area either, with the closest being four customs and immigration officials in Santa Elena, opposite of Castolon, but they seldom patrolled the area around the Johnson's Ranch.

On April 11, 1929, a band of Mexican deserters from Jiménez, estimated to be about thirty to forty in number, arrived on the banks of the Rio Grande. Having crossed 160 miles of the sparsely populated Chihuahuan Desert to arrive at their destination, the Mexicans made camp in the mesquite bosque adjacent to the river, near a massive cottonwood tree that was a sort of landmark in the area. Some of the men had been wounded in the fighting at Jiménez and were in need of medical attention, so their first task was to bring in two local curanderos (doctors without formal training, who specialized in the use of locally grown medicinal herbs) for medical assistance. Their next focus was on food, and for that they looked to the Johnson's Ranch trading post on the other side of the river.

== The raid ==
Sometime during the afternoon of April 11, three Mexicans forded the river and arrived at the trading post, where they met with Elmo Johnson, begging him for food. Johnson obliged, giving the men beans and corn and telling them he would give them a goat to butcher when his herder returned later that afternoon. It remains uncertain if the Mexicans returned for the goat, but the Johnsons waited all night, keeping an eye on the Mexican camp across the river. They eventually gave up, had a late supper and went to bed later than usual. At about 11:00 that evening, Johnson awoke to the sound of horse hooves trotting close by, followed by a knock on his door. Johnson was suspicious because he did not usually do business after dark, but bandits didn't usually knock at the door either. Opening the door he was confronted by two Mexicans asking to buy tobacco in Spanish. Not wanting any trouble, Johnson agreed to sell the men some tobacco and he told them to meet him at the other end of the building, where the commissary was located.

Walking across the large covered patio, Johnson lit a kerosene lamp and proceeded to unlock the commissary door. The Mexicans made their purchase; tobacco and rolling papers, which were paid for in Mexican coin. They stood in silence as they smoked. By this time, Johnson could tell his visitors were getting uneasy, and just as he turned around to pick up his rifle they took off into the darkness. Johnson followed them to the door and heard two shots fired nearby. It was then he realized that his worst fear was coming true. A group of Mexican horsemen were driving his herd of cattle and goats to the river. Johnson raised his rifle and fired at the fleeing Mexicans, but it is uncertain if he hit anything or not. The Mexicans quickly escaped into the darkness, leaving their bounty of stolen livestock along the river's edge.

== Aftermath ==
The first thing Johnson did after the Mexicans were gone was to inform the Border Patrolmen George Dennis and Shelly Barnes, who drove to Castolon to report the raid to Chief Patrol Inspector Earl Falis in Marfa. Falis then informed the commander of the 1st Cavalry Regiment at nearby Camp Marfa, who dispatched a 1st Lieutenant Hugh F. T. Hoffman and his Troop "F" to march to Castolon, establish a base camp there and proceed with patrolling the lower Big Bend area for bandits. Because time was of the essence, Hoffman ordered 2nd Lieutenant Harry W. Johnson (who was of no relation to the Elmo and Ada Johnson) to take his platoon from "F" Troop and a section of machine guns and proceed to Castolon in trucks to protect the nearby trading posts, while the remainder of the troop marched the 116 miles to Castolon on horseback. On the following day, Lieutenant Johnson left the machine gun section in Castolon for protection and proceeded to the Johnson's Ranch. The ranch was all quiet, so Johnson left a few men behind as guards and moved on to patrol Glenn Springs and Boquillas, which were also found to be all quiet. The next few days were spent patrolling the vast openness of the West Texas desert, but no enemies were spotted and the cavalrymen soon returned to Camp Marfa.

== Johnson's Ranch Airfield ==
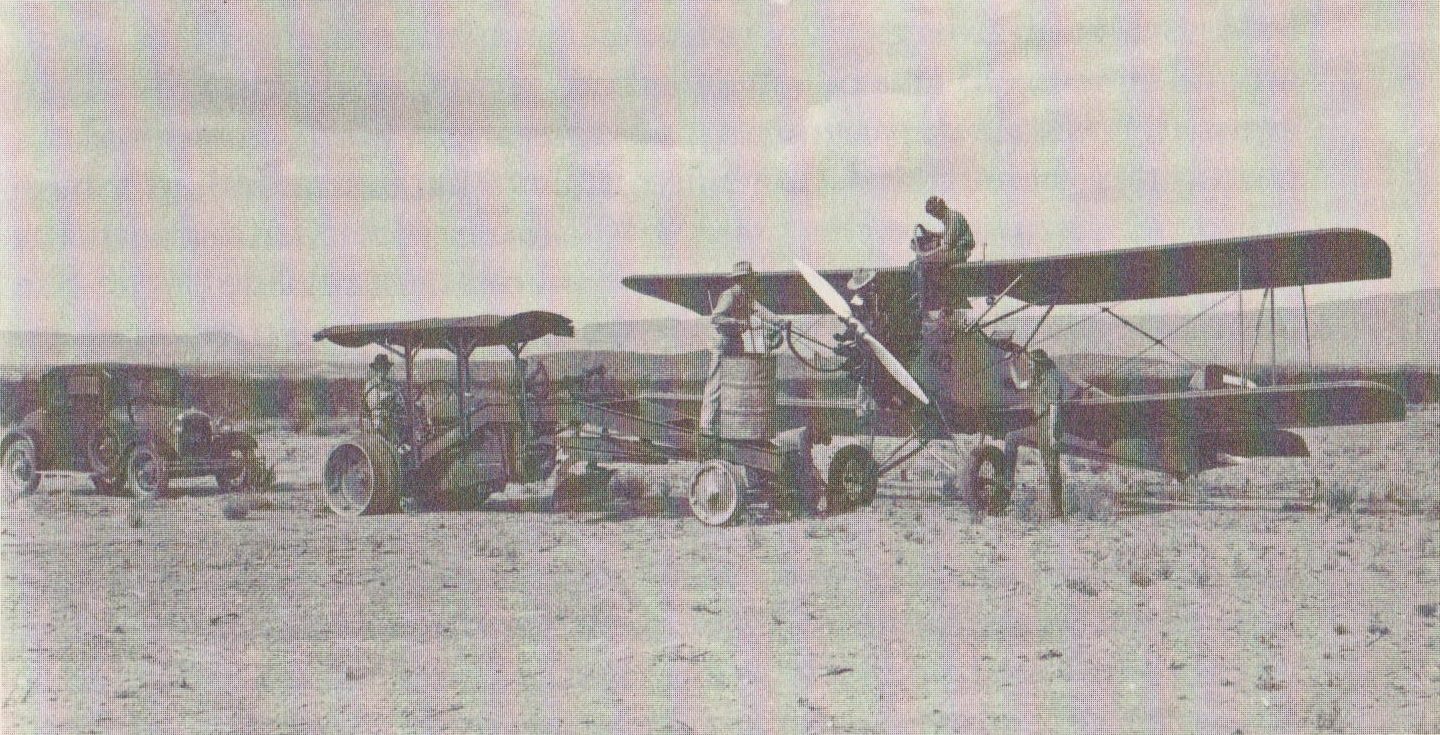
Refueling a US Army Air Corps Consolidated PT-3 aircraft, c.1930. Elmo Johnson is seen refueling the aircraft from a fifty-gallon drum with Lt. Charles W. Deerwester, who is on top of the plane.

On the day after the raid the photographer-journalist W. D. Smithers arrived at the Johnson's Ranch to cover the story. Johnson, as hospitable as ever, was more than happy to tell his story. He also invited Smithers to stay at the ranch for a few days. During this time, Smithers brought up the idea of allowing the United States Army Air Corps to establish an airbase on the ranch property, which was located in a remote but highly strategic position in the Big Bend. Johnson agreed with Smithers, who in turn spoke with his old friend, Colonel Arthur G. Fisher, the 8th Corps Area air officer, who was stationed in San Antonio. Fisher had Johnson's Ranch inspected for use as a military airfield and found it a suitable location, but final say on the establishment of a new airfield was not up to him. Fisher then consulted with Major Robert J. Haplin, assistant chief of staff of the 8th Corps Area, as well as the senior military intelligence officer in the area, who agreed to support the project, thinking it would be an excellent place to gather intelligence about activities along the Mexican border and also a good staging point for combat operations, in case of another border emergency.

Work on the new airfield began that summer and was completed by July 6, 1929, when the first landing was recorded. The site chosen was immediately north of the Johnson's Ranch headquarters, where the ranch house and trading post were located, all of which is now located within Big Bend National Park. The ranch house was thenceforth used as the headquarters for the airfield, in addition to the Johnson's ranching activities. By 1939, the airfield consisted of three graded dirt runways, the longest of which measured 4,200 feet. For the pilots, Johnson constructed two large rock piles spaced 100 feet apart near the landing threshold and at night would set two lanterns up to help guide the pilots to a safe landing. Improvements such as these made the Johnson's Ranch Airfield a "safe, all-weather operational facility for emergency combat aircraft."

The Johnson's Ranch Airfield quickly became a notable locale in the pioneer history of aviation in the United States. Many young officers who would later rise in the ranks and achieve fame and notability in World War II served at the Johnson's Ranch, among them General Nathan F. Twining, a chairman of the Joint Chiefs of Staff, and General Jonathan M. Wainwright, a Medal of Honor recipient for his services in the Battle of Bataan. There were no further bandit raids in the Johnson's Ranch area, though the field remained open for the next fourteen years, finally being deactivated in 1943. The "Border Raid Mission", as the cavalry and air patrols became known, officially ended late in October 1931, when the "emergency" was lifted. Though they never went into action, the "Border Raid Mission" provided many young American pilots with valuable flight experience that helped prepare them for the rigorous service in World War II ten years later.

== See also ==
- Cristero War
