= Richard Barrett (Medal of Honor) =

United States Army Medal of Honor recipient (1838–1898)

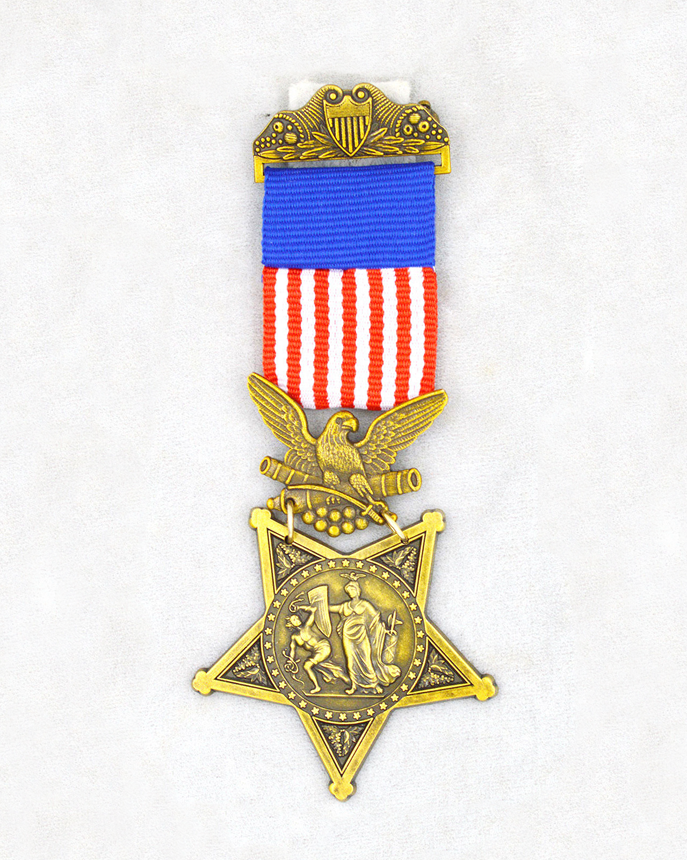
- Army Medal of Honor, 1862–1895
- Born: 1838; County Mayo, Ireland
- Died: March 20, 1898 (aged 60); Washington, D.C., United States
- Burial place: US Soldiers' and Airmen's Home National Cemetery
- Military career
- Allegiance: United States of America
- Branch: United States Army
- Service years: c. 1872–c. 1875
- Rank: First Sergeant
- Unit: 1st U.S. Cavalry
- Conflicts: Indian Wars
- Awards: Medal of Honor

First Sergeant Richard Barrett (1838 – March 20, 1898) was an Irish-born American soldier in the U.S. Army who served with the 1st U.S. Cavalry Regiment during the Indian Wars. He was awarded the Medal of Honor during the Apache Wars when he voluntarily led a charge against a group of hostile Tonto Apaches at Sycamore Canyon on May 23, 1872.

== Biography ==
Richard Barrett was born in County Mayo, Ireland in 1838. He eventually emigrated to the United States and settled in Buffalo, New York. It was there that Barrett enlisted in the United States Army and was assigned to Company A of the 1st U.S. Cavalry Regiment. By 1872, he had risen to the rank of first sergeant. On May 23 of that year, while posted to the Arizona Territory, Barrett volunteered to lead a charge against a group of renegade Tonto Apaches at Sycamore Canyon. He was cited for "conspicuous gallantry" and recommended for the Medal of Honor for his actions which he officially received on April 12, 1875. Barrett moved to Washington, D.C. after his retirement from military service. He died there on March 20, 1898, at the age of 60. He was interred at the United States Soldiers' and Airmen's Home National Cemetery.

== Medal of Honor citation ==
Rank and organization: First Sergeant, Company A, 1st U.S. Cavalry. Place and date: At Sycamore Canyon, Ariz., May 23, 1872. Entered service at: --. Birth: Ireland. Date of issue: April 12, 1875.

Citation:

Consplcuous gallantry in a charge upon the Tonto Apaches.

== See also ==
- List of Medal of Honor recipients
