= Battle of Infernal Caverns =

- Part of the Indian Wars, Snake War
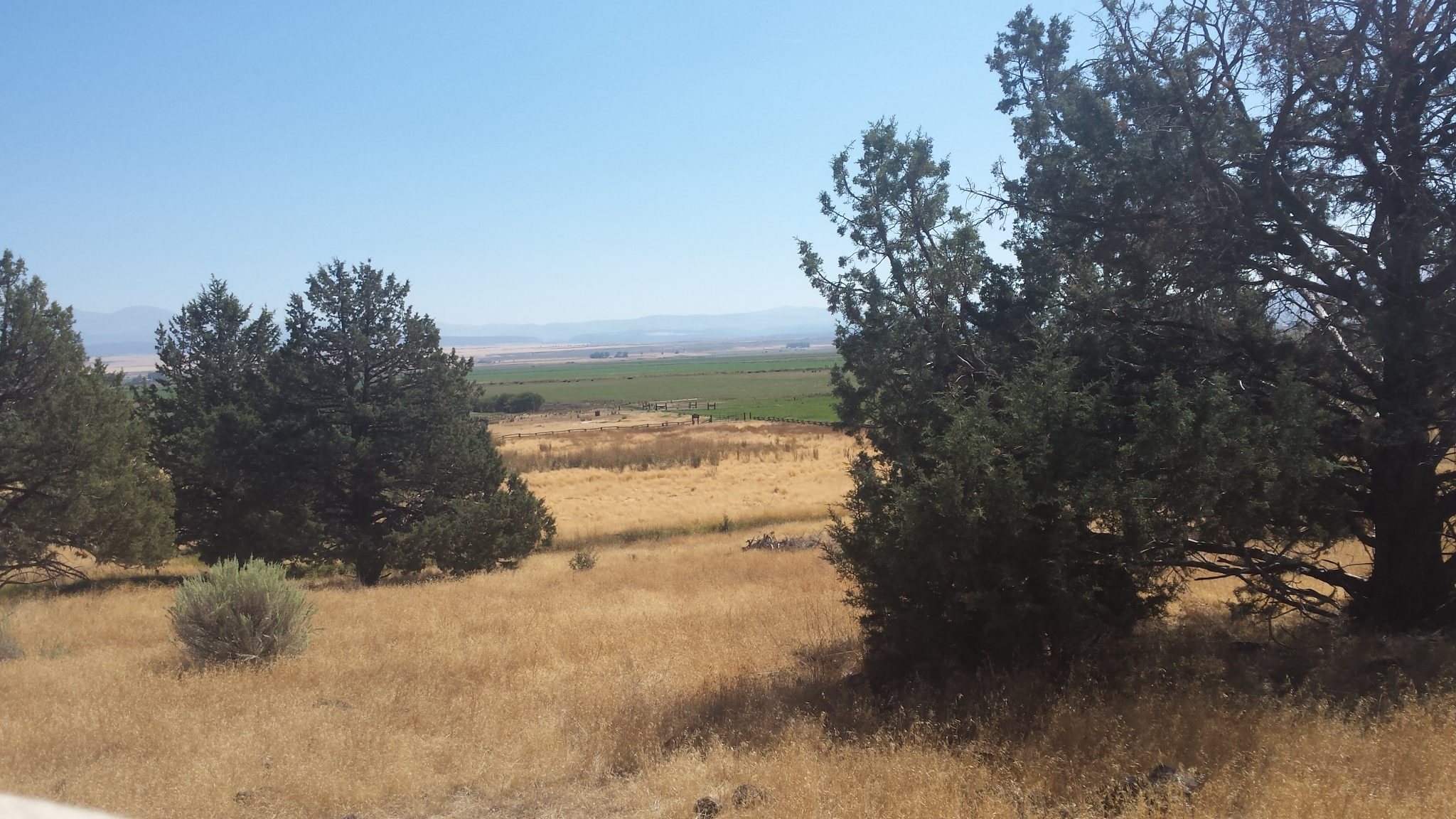
- Site of the battle in 2016
Date	26–28 September 1867
Location	Infernal Caverns, Likely, California
Result	U.S. victory

Belligerents
United States; Warm Springs; Shoshone	Paiute; Pit River Indians; Modoc

Commanders and leaders
George Crook	Cheeoh; Sieta

Strength
1st U.S. Cavalry; 23rd U.S. Infantry (110 soldiers); Warm Springs and Shoshone Scouts (15 Natives)	75 Paiute; 30 Pit River few Modoc

Casualties and losses
8 killed 11 wounded	20 killed 12 wounded 2 captured

The Battle of Infernal Caverns was a battle during the Snake War fought between Native Americans and the U.S. Army. The Native American warriors had made a fortress out of lava rocks in the Infernal Caverns of northern California near the town of Likely. From there they were able to pour a steady fire upon the soldiers commanded by Lt. Col. George Crook. Crook's men attacked on the second day. Despite heavy casualties they managed to scale the cliffs and take the fortifications. Colonel Crook reportedly shot down Chief Sieto himself. Fighting continued into the night as the Native warriors withdrew deeper into the caverns. Crook commented, "I never wanted dynamite so bad as I did when we first took the fort and heard the diabolical and defiant yells from down in the rocks". On the third day the Natives had fled the caverns.
