= Likely (surname) =

Likely is a surname. Notable people with the surname include:

- Isaiah Likely (born 2000), American football tight end
- William Likely (born 1994), American football cornerback

== See also ==
- Likely McBrien (1892–1956), Australian politician and rules football administrator
- Likely (disambiguation)
