= Thomas J. Smith (Medal of Honor) =

United States Army Medal of Honor recipient

Thomas J. Smith was a United States Army soldier who received the Medal of Honor.

== Biography ==
Smith was born in England (or Boston, Massachusetts) and was a private in Troop G, 1st U.S. Cavalry.

He was awarded the Medal of Honor on 14 February 1870 for gallantry in action in a battle at the Chiricahua Mountains in Arizona on 20 October 1869.

His Medal of Honor was credited to New York City, New York.

Private Smith's later life and place of burial are unknown.

== Citation ==
Medal of Honor citation:

- "Gallantry in action."

== See also ==
- List of Medal of Honor recipients for the Indian Wars
