= Rio Peñasco =

Water stream in Pecos River watershed

Coordinates: 32.7446°N 104.3298°W

Rio Penasco is a 40-mile long stream located in the Pecos River watershed. It is located in Chaves County, New Mexico, Eddy County, New Mexico, and Otero County, New Mexico.
