= Infernal Caverns =

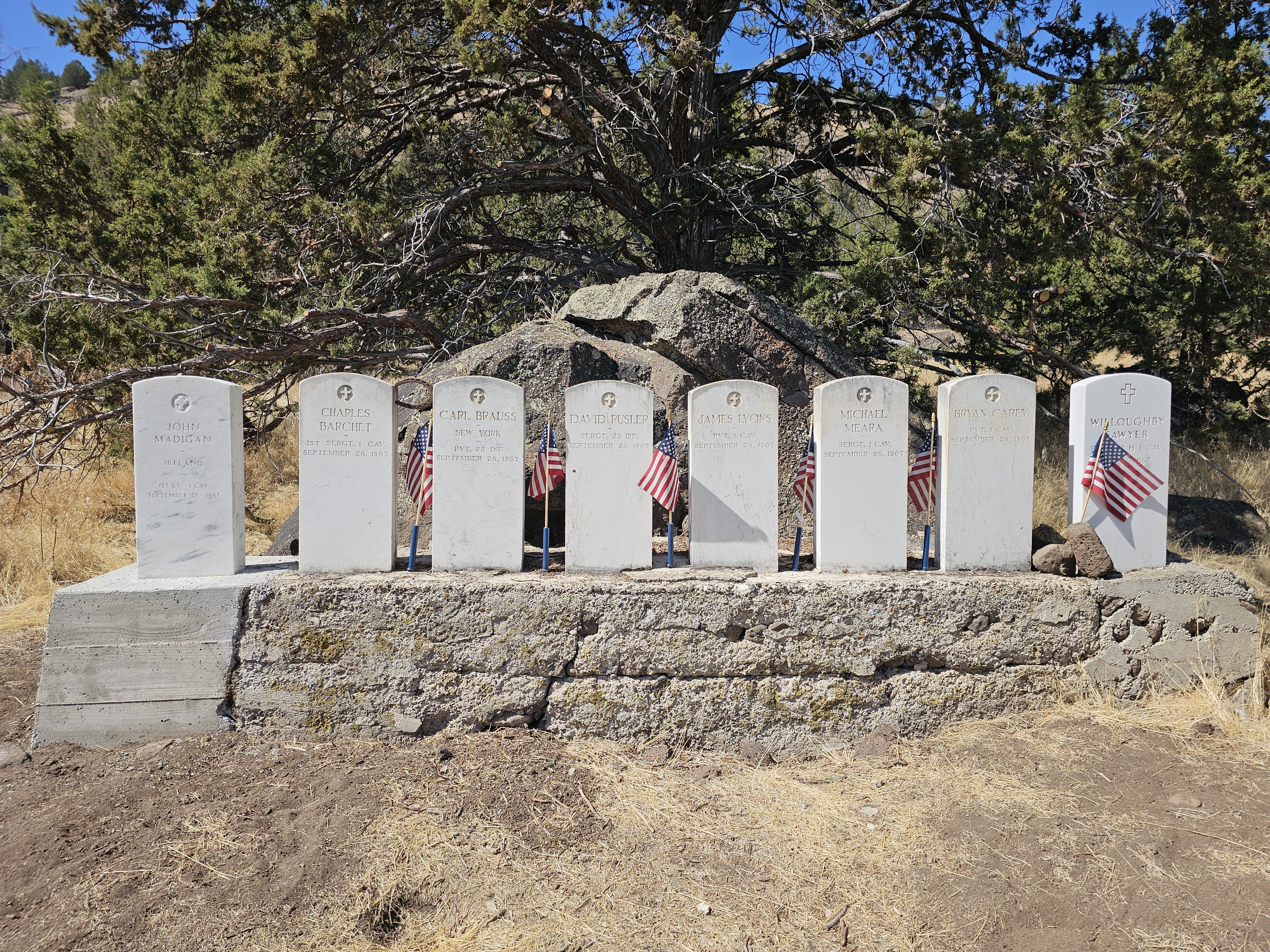
- Row of soldiers' graves at the battle site, 2025

- Location within California Location within the United States
- 41.272222°N 120.576111°W
- Location: Near Likely, California

California Historical Landmark
- Official name: Infernal Caverns Battleground
- Reference no.: 16

Infernal Caverns is the site of an 1867 battle between U.S. armed forces and Shoshone, Paiute, and Pit River Indians. Infernal Caverns Battleground is California Historical Landmark No. 16.

== Location ==
Infernal Caverns, also known as Hell Caves, is located 6.5 miles west of Likely, California, and 1 mile south of the Ferry Ranch in Modoc County, California. The Infernal Caverns Battleground was the site of one of the last Indian battles fought in California, on September 26–27, 1867.

== History ==
United States Army General George Crook was sent west to quell Indian uprisings that had begun in 1848 when the Northern Paiutes and other tribes in what is now Northern California, Northern Nevada, and Southern Oregon, engaged in both offensive and defense battles protecting their homelands. The last incident that had brought U.S. Army action was when Indigenous soldiers killed 78 miners who were en route to Colorado.

With the 39th Mounted Infantry, General Crook tracked the Native Americans south from Goose Lake (which lies on what is now the California-Oregon border), engaging them in a desolate spot named Infernal Caverns. The two-day battle began high in a canyon characterized by large boulders, rocky caverns, and hollow fumaroles caused by lava flows. Eight U.S. soldiers were killed. Six were buried at the site, and a seventh, Sgt. David Rustler, was transported by double mule travois to Camp Warner at Goose Lake, where he died a few days later. Lt. John Madigan, the only officer killed in the fight, was buried just outside the town of Alturas, California.

== Memorial ==
Six white marble tombstones were erected by the U.S. government to mark the burial location for the soldiers. One additional tombstone was added in 1995 for Private Willoughby Sawyer, who also died in this battle and whose marker was missing. This historical omission was discovered by California historian Chris J. Wright.

== See also ==
- Battle of Infernal Caverns

== Sources ==
- Alta California Newspaper, September 28, 1868 (morning edition).
- Bourke, John G. Crook in Indian Country, 1867-68.
- Bourke John G. (1968). With General Crook in the Indian Wars.
- Brown, William S. (1951) California Northeast: The Bloody Ground.
- Schmitt, Martin F. (Ed.) (1960). General George Crook: His Autobiography. Norman: University of Oklahoma Press.
- Modoc Record, September 23, 1995
- New York Times, July 28, 1867.
- Parnell, William R. Operations Against Hostile Indians with General George Crook.
- Riddle, Francis A. (1960). Honey Lake Paiute Ethnology.
- Underhill, Ruth (1941). The Northern Paiute Indians of California and Nevada. Washington, D.C.: U.S. Department of the Interior.
- Valley Times Newspaper; Vol. 111 No. 268, September 25, 1995.
- Wassons, Joe. News story on the Battle of Infernal Caverns.
- Wright, Chris. J., ""Battle of Infernal Caverns". True West Magazine August 1995, Fields of Fire

=== Further reading ===
- Utley, Robert M. Frontier Regulars: The United States Army and the Indian 1866-1891.
- Goldsborough, Bruff J. Gold Rush: The Journals, Drawings and other papers of J. Goldsborough Bruff. Edited by G. Read and R. Gains.
- Register of Enlistments, United States Army 1860.
