= Likely, California =

Likely
- census-designated place
- Location of Likely in Modoc County, California.

- Location in California
- Coordinates: 41°13′50″N 120°30′15″W
- Country: United States
- State: California
- County: Modoc

Area
  - Total: 1.334 sq mi (3.454 km^{2})
  - Land: 1.329 sq mi (3.442 km^{2})
  - Water: 0.0046 sq mi (0.012 km^{2}) 0.34%
- Elevation: 4,449 ft (1,356 m)

Population (2020)
  - Total: 58
  - Density: 44/sq mi (17/km^{2})
- Time zone: UTC-8 (Pacific (PST))
  - Summer (DST): UTC-7 (PDT)
- ZIP code: 96116
- Area codes: 530, 837
- FIPS code: 06-41390
- GNIS feature IDs: 262452; 2583057

Likely (formerly, South Fork) is a census-designated place in Modoc County, California, United States. It is located near the south fork of the Pit River, 18 miles (29 km) south of the county seat of Alturas, at an elevation of 4,449 feet (1,356 m). Its population is 53 as of the 2020 census, down from 63 at the time of the 2010 census. Located 6 miles (9.7 km) north-northwest of Likely Mountain, it is somewhat sheltered from prevailing southwesterly winds, and its microclimate is noticeably drier and less stormy than surrounding areas. The ZIP Code for the community is 96116.

== Geography ==
Likely lies on the south side of the South Fork of the Pit River, in the south end of South Fork Valley, in the northeastern corner of California at 41°13′50″N 120°30′15″W. Fragments of the southern edge of the Modoc Plateau surround Likely on most sides.

=== Climate ===
Jess Valley, 5400 ft (1646 m), is a nearby weather station. Jess Valley has a dry-summer humid continental climate (Köppen Dsb), bordering on a Warm-summer Mediterranean climate (Köppen Csb).

Climate data for Jess Valley, California, 1991–2020 normals, 1948–2020 extremes: 5400ft (1646m)
Month	Jan	Feb	Mar	Apr	May	Jun	Jul	Aug	Sep	Oct	Nov	Dec	Year
Record high °F (°C)	69 (21)	68 (20)	76 (24)	81 (27)	89 (32)	96 (36)	102 (39)	105 (41)	96 (36)	91 (33)	78 (26)	67 (19)	105 (41)
Mean maximum °F (°C)	57.0 (13.9)	58.9 (14.9)	65.5 (18.6)	72.2 (22.3)	78.3 (25.7)	87.0 (30.6)	93.6 (34.2)	93.3 (34.1)	88.7 (31.5)	80.1 (26.7)	67.8 (19.9)	56.0 (13.3)	93.7 (34.3)
Mean daily maximum °F (°C)	42.5 (5.8)	44.9 (7.2)	49.5 (9.7)	54.8 (12.7)	64.1 (17.8)	73.5 (23.1)	84.0 (28.9)	83.5 (28.6)	77.3 (25.2)	64.7 (18.2)	51.1 (10.6)	42.0 (5.6)	61.0 (16.1)
Daily mean °F (°C)	31.7 (−0.2)	33.0 (0.6)	36.6 (2.6)	41.1 (5.1)	49.2 (9.6)	56.6 (13.7)	65.3 (18.5)	64.6 (18.1)	58.3 (14.6)	47.7 (8.7)	38.1 (3.4)	30.7 (−0.7)	46.1 (7.8)
Mean daily minimum °F (°C)	20.9 (−6.2)	21.1 (−6.1)	23.8 (−4.6)	27.4 (−2.6)	34.4 (1.3)	39.8 (4.3)	46.6 (8.1)	45.6 (7.6)	39.3 (4.1)	30.8 (−0.7)	25.1 (−3.8)	19.5 (−6.9)	31.2 (−0.5)
Mean minimum °F (°C)	5.1 (−14.9)	8.3 (−13.2)	11.6 (−11.3)	17.6 (−8.0)	25.1 (−3.8)	29.8 (−1.2)	38.0 (3.3)	37.5 (3.1)	29.4 (−1.4)	19.8 (−6.8)	9.7 (−12.4)	1.7 (−16.8)	−1.1 (−18.4)
Record low °F (°C)	−33 (−36)	−28 (−33)	−7 (−22)	5 (−15)	15 (−9)	18 (−8)	19 (−7)	27 (−3)	18 (−8)	3 (−16)	−8 (−22)	−28 (−33)	−33 (−36)
Average precipitation inches (mm)	1.93 (49)	1.56 (40)	1.85 (47)	2.38 (60)	2.77 (70)	1.53 (39)	0.43 (11)	0.38 (9.7)	0.58 (15)	1.15 (29)	1.90 (48)	2.41 (61)	18.87 (478.7)
Average snowfall inches (cm)	12.50 (31.8)	8.70 (22.1)	14.50 (36.8)	14.40 (36.6)	4.20 (10.7)	0.40 (1.0)	0.00 (0.00)	0.00 (0.00)	0.10 (0.25)	2.90 (7.4)	8.10 (20.6)	16.20 (41.1)	82 (208.35)
Average precipitation days (≥ 0.01 in)	9.1	8.6	10.0	9.8	8.3	4.8	1.6	1.9	2.7	5.0	8.1	9.3	79.2
Average snowy days (≥ 0.1 in)	5.5	4.8	4.4	5.4	1.4	0.2	0.0	0.0	0.1	1.0	3.7	5.5	32
Source 1: NOAA
Source 2: XMACIS2 (records & 1991-2020 monthly max/mins)

== History ==
Likely now occupies what was originally an Achumawi (Pit River) village known as Hamawe or Hammawi. The town was initially known as South Fork, named after the South Fork of the Pit River, and was renamed at the insistence of the United States Post Office, which insisted at that time that Post Offices could only have short, unique names. Residents were unable to agree what to name their town until a local rancher observed that they would most likely never agree upon a name, at which point someone nominated the name, "Likely", and the name was voted in. The South Fork post office operated from 1878 to 1882. The Likely post office opened in 1886.

One of the last of the American Indian Wars was fought at Infernal Caverns, a short distance from Likely.

A 1913 book described Likely as having a population of 75, and situated along the main automobile route from Madeline to Bayley.

The Likely Peat Moss Company, Radel Inc. operated in Likely until 1987 when the non-renewing supply of high quality hypnum peat moss in nearby Jess Valley was depleted. The peat moss was strip-mined from the floor of Jess Valley and trucked 13 miles to Likely on the winding canyon road paralleling South Fork Pit River between Likely and Ivy, California. The peat moss was processed and packaged and then shipped by both truck and by Southern Pacific Railroad until rail services to Likely were discontinued. The company, Radel, was dissolved in 1987 upon the owner's retirement.

== Geography ==
According to the United States Census Bureau, the CDP covers an area of 1.3 square miles (3.5 km^{2}), 99.66% land and 0.34% water.

== Demographics ==
Historical population
Census	Pop.	Note	%±
2010	63		—
2020	58		−7.9%
U.S. Decennial Census; 1850–1870 1880-1890; 1900 1910 1920; 1930 1940 1950; 1960 1970 1980; 1990 2000 2010

Likely first appeared as a census designated place in the 2010 U.S. census.

The 2020 United States census reported that Likely had a population of 58. The population density was 43.6 inhabitants per square mile (16.8/km^{2}). The racial makeup of Likely was 47 (81%) White, 4 (7%) Native American, and 7 (12%) from two or more races. Hispanic or Latino of any race were 3 persons (5%).

There were 22 households, of which 18 were families and 3 were one person living alone.
The median age was 59.4 years. There were 26 males and 32 females.

There were 42 housing units, of which 22 were occupied. Of these, 11 were owner-occupied, and 11 were occupied by renters.

== Politics ==
In the state legislature, Likely is in the 1st senatorial district, represented by Republican Megan Dahle, and the 1st Assembly district, represented by Republican Heather Hadwick.

Federally, Likely is in California's 1st congressional district, represented by Republican James Gallagher.

== Economy ==
The primary industries of Likely and its surroundings are ranching and tourism.

Local, State, Federal, and Tribal governments are the largest employers in Modoc. Timber and peat moss industries in the county collapsed in the 1980s due to increased costs and loss of railroad infrastructure.

The Likely Airport 9CL3, about 3 miles (4.8 km) west of town, is privately owned.

Internet access in Likely is limited to dial-up service, provided by High Desert Online and Frontier Communications.

== Education ==
Modoc Joint Unified School District is the local school district.

== See also ==
- Likely Rancheria
