= Pattern (sewing) =

Template from which the parts of a garment are traced onto fabric before being cut out

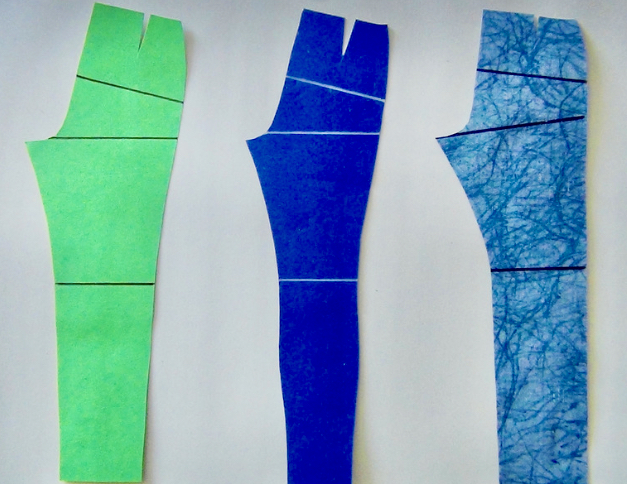
Three patterns for pants (2022). Pattern making is typically taught at smaller scales such as 1:4 to conserve paper.

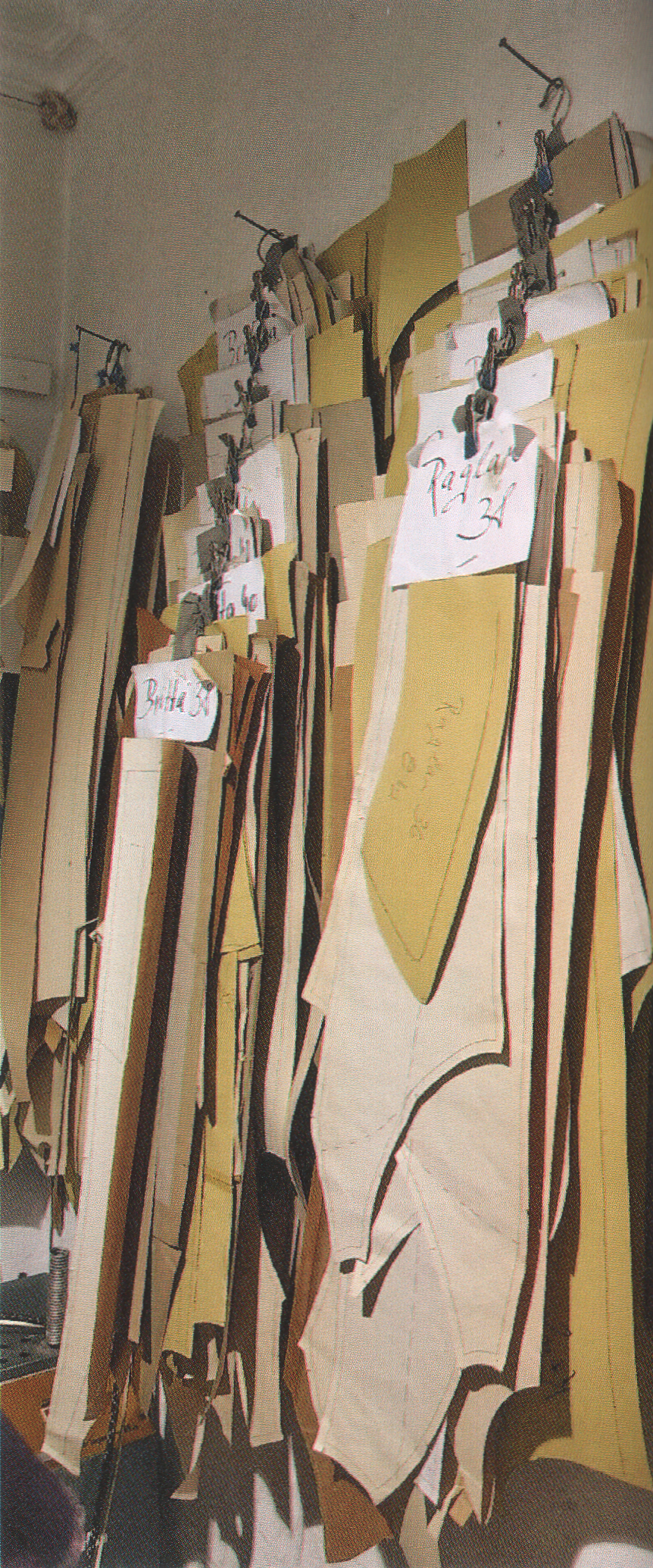
Storage of patterns

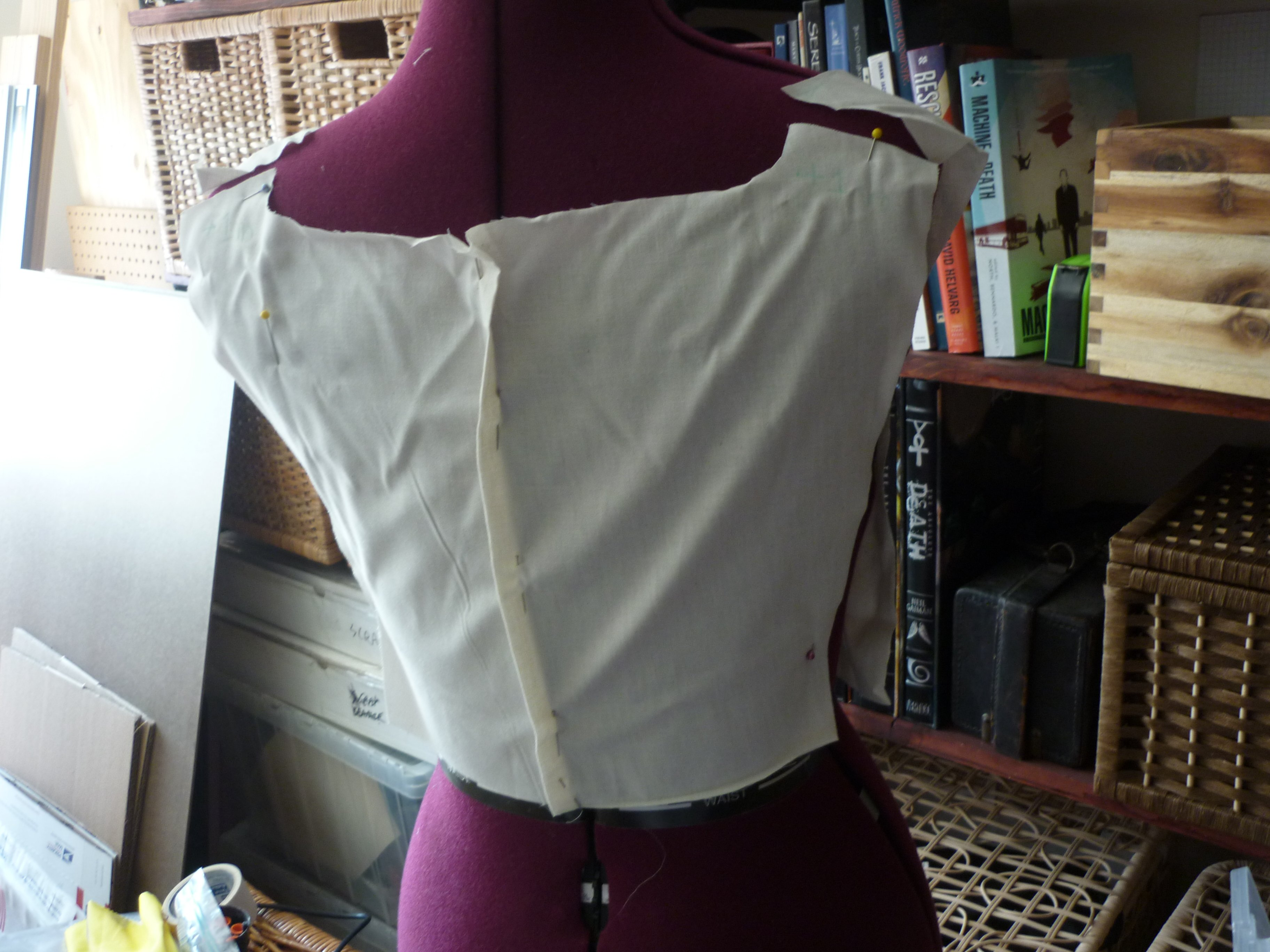
Fitting a nettle/canvas-fabric on a dress form

In sewing and fashion design, a pattern is the template from which the parts of a garment are traced onto woven or knitted fabric before being cut out and assembled. Patterns are usually made of paper, and are sometimes made of sturdier materials like paperboard or cardboard if they need to be more robust to withstand repeated use. The process of making or cutting patterns is sometimes referred to as patternmaking, but it can also be written as pattern making or pattern cutting.

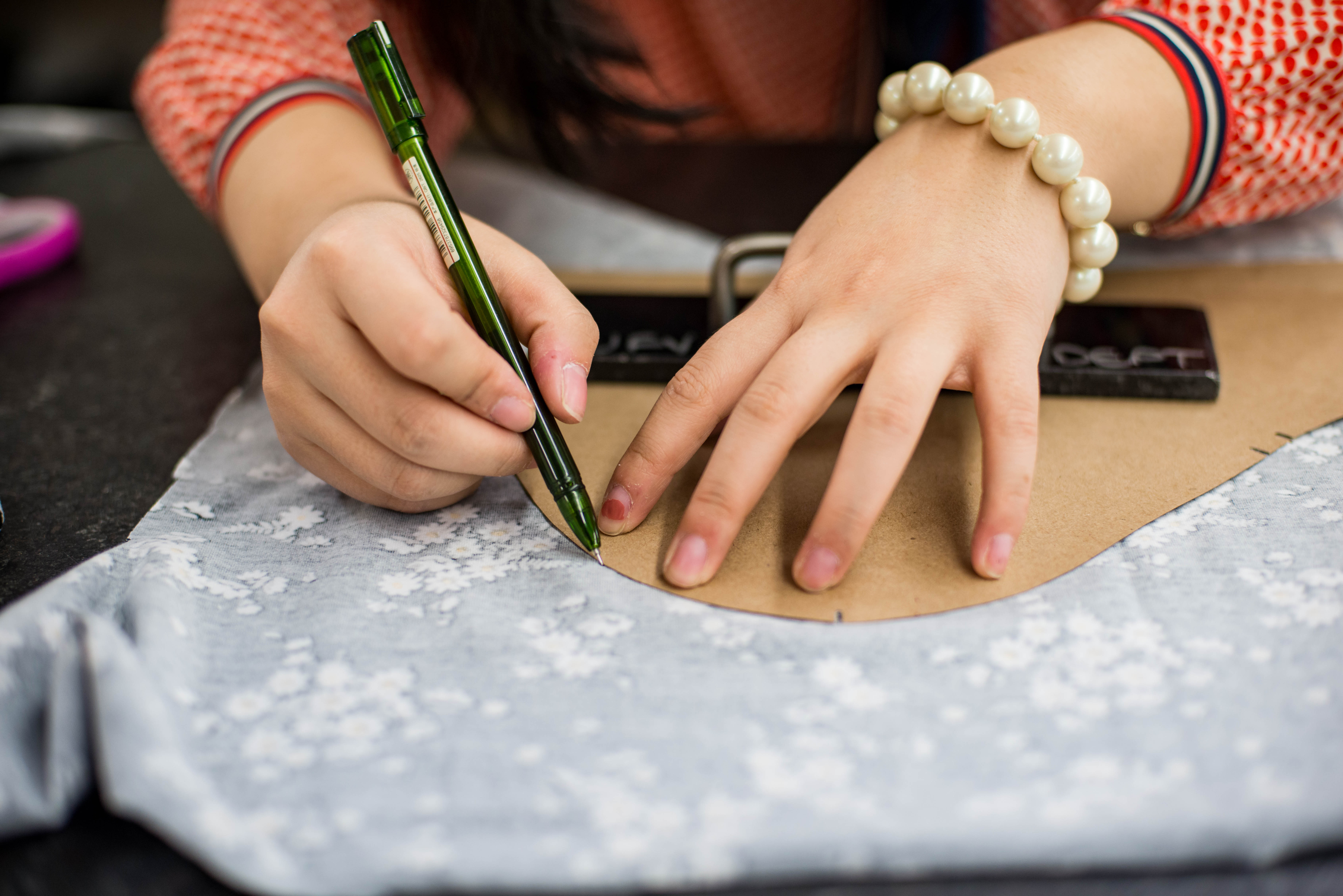
Student tracing pattern onto fabric

A sloper pattern, also called a block pattern, is a custom-fitted, basic pattern from which patterns for many different styles can be developed. The process of changing the size of a finished pattern is called pattern grading.

Several companies, like Butterick and Simplicity, specialize in selling pre-graded patterns directly to consumers. These patterns are usually printed on tissue paper and include multiple sizes that overlap each other. An illustrated instruction sheet for use and assembly of the item is usually included. The pattern may include multiple style options in one package.

Clothing brands make their patterns with in-house patternmakers, third-party specialists, or (often when manufacturing in overseas factories) will rely on the factory’s in-house patternmakers. While commercial production patterns are engineered to fit several standard average body sizes, in bespoke clothing, patterns must be adjusted or developed for each individual client.

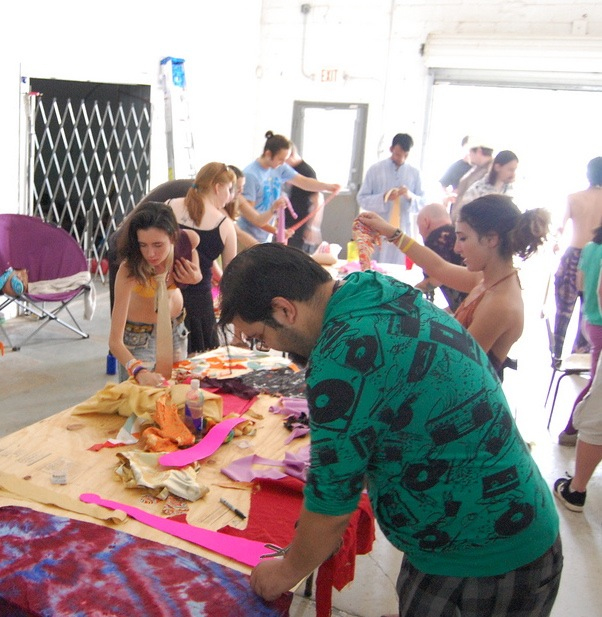
Students cutting patterns in a sewing class

== Pattern making ==
A patternmaker typically employs one of two methods to create a pattern.

The flat-pattern method is where the entire pattern is drafted on a flat surface from measurements, using rulers, curves, and straight-edges. A pattern maker would also use various tools such as a notcher, drill, and awl to mark the pattern. Usually, flat patterning begins with the creation of a "sloper" or "block" pattern: a simple, fitted garment made to the wearer's measurements. For women, this will usually be a jewel-neck bodice and narrow skirt, and for men, an upper sloper and a pants sloper. The final sloper pattern is usually made of cardboard or paperboard, without seam allowances or style details (thicker paper or cardboard allows repeated tracing and pattern development from the original sloper). Once the shape of the sloper has been refined by making a series of mock-up garments called toiles (UK) or muslins (US) or Nessel in German, the final sloper can be used to create patterns for many styles of garments with varying necklines, sleeves, dart placements, and so on. The flat pattern drafting method is the most commonly used method in menswear; menswear rarely involves draping.

The draping method involves creating a mock-up pattern made of a strong fabric (such as calico) in a linen weave. The fabric is far coarser than muslin, but less coarse and thick than canvas or denim. However, it is still very cheap, owing to its unfinished and undyed appearance. Then, by pinning this fabric directly on a form, the fabric outline and markings will be then transferred onto a paper pattern, or the fabric itself will be used as the pattern. Designers drafting a sculpted evening gown or dress which uses a lot of fabric--typically cut on the bias--will use the draping technique, as it is very difficult to achieve this with a flat pattern. This method is also used for collars.

Each pattern manufacturer has their own size ranges. A distinction is made between a basic pattern, a first pattern, and a production pattern. Patternmakers grade the first cuts to the desired size with the aid of CAD software (computer-aided design). The production pattern must contain all the information necessary for production and all the necessary parts. The collections are produced in sets of sizes. The customer has the garment altered by a tailor after purchase, if necessary.

=== Pattern digitizing ===
After a paper/fabric pattern is completed, very often patternmakers digitize their patterns for archiving and vendor communication purposes. The previous standard for digitizing was the digitizing tablet. Nowadays, automatic options such as scanners and camera systems are available.

=== Fitting patterns ===
Mass market patterns are made standardized, so store-bought patterns fit most people well. Experienced dressmakers can adjust standard patterns to better fit any body shape. A sewer may choose a standard size (usually from the wearer's bust measurement) that has been pre-graded on a purchased pattern. They may decide to tailor or adjust a pattern to improve the fit or style for the garment wearer by using French curves, hip curves, and cutting or folding on straight edges. There are alternate methods of adjusting a pattern, either directly on flat pattern pieces from the wearer's measurements, using a pre-draped personalized sloper, or using draping methods on a dress form with inexpensive fabrics like muslin.

Some dress forms are adjustable to match the wearer's unique measurements, and the muslin is fit around the form accordingly. By taking it in or letting it out, a smaller or larger fit can be made from the original pattern.

Creating a sample from canvas is another method of making patterns. Canvas fabric is inexpensive, not elastic and made from Urticaceae. It is easy to work with when making quick adjustments, by pinning the fabric around the wearer or a dress form. The sewer cuts the pieces using the same method that they will use for the actual garment, according to a pattern. The pieces are then fit together and darts and other adjustments are made. This provides the sewer with measurements to use as a guideline for marking the patterns and cutting the fabric for the finished garment.

=== Pattern grading ===
Pattern grading is the process of shrinking or enlarging a finished pattern to accommodate it to people of different sizes. Grading rules determine how patterns increase or decrease to create different sizes. Fabric type also influences pattern grading standards. The cost of pattern grading is incomplete without considering marker making.

=== Parametric pattern drafting ===
Parametric pattern drafting implies using a program algorithm to draft patterns for every individual size from scratch, using size measurements, variables and geometric objects.

There is number of pattern drawing plugins for the popular parametric CAD software (e.g. for AutoCAD), as well as specialized pattern design software with parametric drawing support (e.g. Valentina).

== Standard pattern symbols ==
Sewing patterns typically include standard symbols and marks that guide the cutter and/or sewer in cutting and assembling the pieces of the pattern. Patterns may use:

- Notches, to indicate:
  - Seam allowances. (not all patterns include allowances)
  - Centerlines and other lines important to the fit like the waistline, hip, breast, shoulder tip, etc.
  - Zipper placement
  - Fold point for folded hems and facings
  - Matched points, especially for long or curving seams or seams with ease. For example, the Armscye will usually be notched at the point where ease should begin to be added to the sleeve cap. There is usually no ease through the underarm.
- Circular holes, perhaps made by an awl or circular punch, to indicate:
  - A dart apex
  - Corners, as they are stitched, i.e. without seam allowances
  - Pocket placement, or the placement of other details like trimming
  - Buttonholes and buttons
- A long arrow, drawn on top of the pattern, to indicate:
  - Grainline, or how the pattern should be aligned with the fabric. The arrow is meant to be aligned parallel to the straight grain of the fabric. A long arrow with arrowheads at both ends indicates that either of two orientations is possible. An arrow with one head probably indicates that the fabric has a direction to it which needs to be considered, such as a pattern which should face up when the wearer is standing.
- Double lines indicating where the pattern may be lengthened or shortened for a different fit
- Dot, triangle, or square symbols, to provide "match points" for adjoining pattern pieces, similar to putting puzzle pieces together

Many patterns will also have full outlines for some features, like for a patch pocket, making it easier to visualize how things go together.

== Patterns for commercial clothing manufacture ==
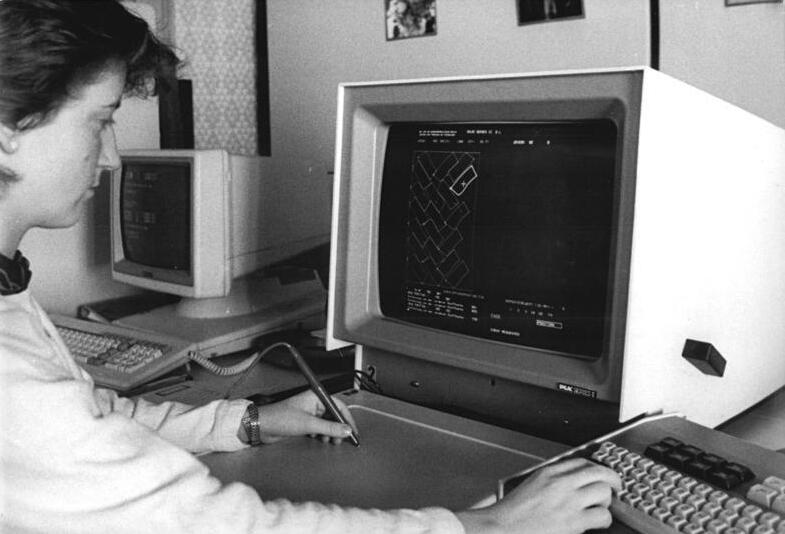
Marker-making by computer

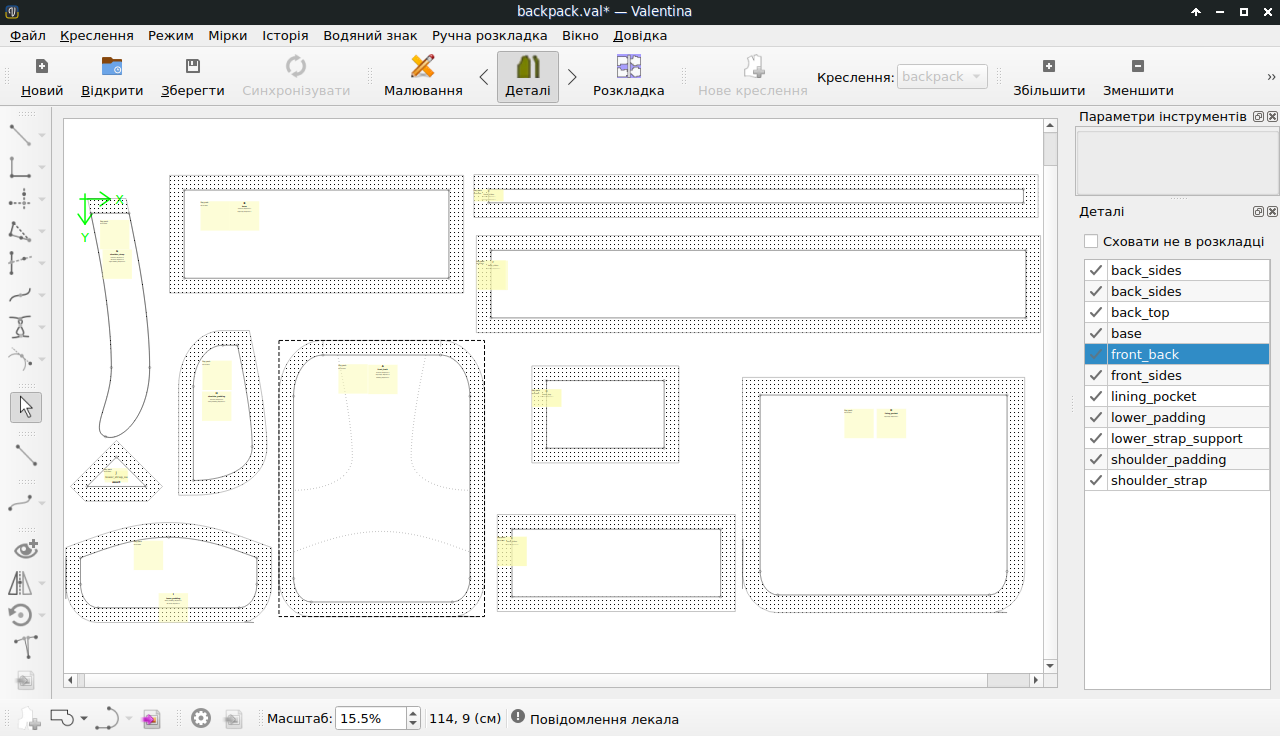
Backpack pattern making in Valentina

The making of industrial patterns begins with an existing block pattern that most closely resembles the designer's vision. Patterns are cut of oak tag (manila folder) paper, punched with a hole and stored by hanging with a special hook. The pattern is first checked for accuracy, then it is cut out of sample fabrics and the resulting garment is fit-tested. Once the pattern meets the designer's approval, a small production run of selling samples is made and the style is presented to buyers in wholesale markets. If the style has demonstrated sales potential, the pattern is graded for sizes, usually by computer with an apparel industry specific CAD program (or plugin for general purpose CAD, like AutoCAD). There are a wide variety of pattern making and grading/marker making programs (Valentina, Optitex, Clo3D, etc.), each with their own features.

Following grading, the pattern must be vetted; the accuracy of each size and the direct comparison in laying seam lines is done. After these steps have been followed and any errors corrected, the pattern is approved for production. When the manufacturing company is ready to manufacture the style, all of the sizes of each given pattern piece are arranged into a marker, usually by computer. A marker is an arrangement of all of the pattern pieces over the area of the fabric to be cut that minimizes fabric waste while maintaining the desired grainlines. It's sort of like a pattern of patterns from which all pieces will be cut. The marker is then laid on top of the layers of fabric and cut. Commercial markers often include multiple sets of patterns for popular sizes. For example: one set of size Small, two sets of size Medium and one set of size Large. Once the style has been sold and delivered to stores – and if it proves to be quite popular – the pattern of this style will itself become a block, with subsequent generations of patterns developed from it.

== Standard designing and adjusting tools ==
- Hip curve
- L-Square
- French curves
- Pattern notcher
- Dress forms
- Slopers - Bodice, skirt, trousers, etc.

== Retail patterns ==
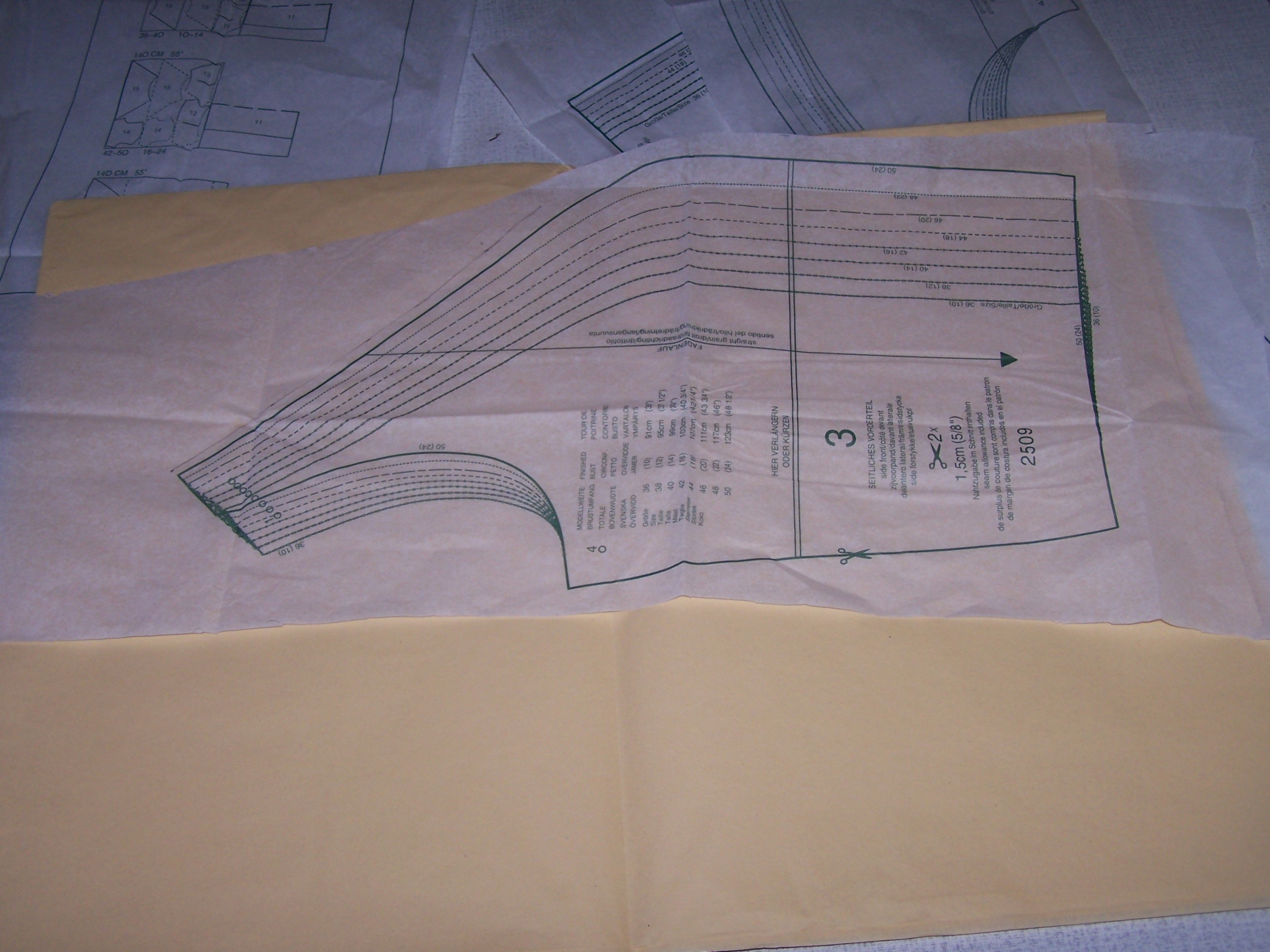
Home tissue paper sewing pattern

Digital home sewing pattern

Home sewing patterns are generally printed on tissue paper and sold in packets containing sewing instructions and suggestions for fabric and trim. They are also available over the Internet as downloadable files. Home sewers can print the patterns at home or take the electronic file to a business that does copying and printing. Many pattern companies distribute sewing patterns as electronic files as an alternative to, or in place of, pre-printed packets, which the home sewer can print at home or take to a local copyshop, as they include large format printing versions. Modern patterns are available in a wide range of prices, sizes, styles, and sewing skill levels, to meet the needs of consumers.

The majority of modern-day home sewing patterns contain multiple sizes in one pattern. Once a pattern is removed from a package, you can either cut the pattern based on the size you will be making or you can preserve the pattern by tracing it. The pattern is traced onto fabric using one of several methods. In one method, tracing paper with transferable ink on one side is placed between the pattern and the fabric. A tracing wheel is moved over the pattern outlines, transferring the markings onto the fabric with ink that is removable by erasing or washing. In another method, tracing paper is laid directly over a purchased pattern, and the pieces are traced. The pieces are cut, then the tracing paper is pinned and/or basted to the fabric. The fabric can then be cut to match the outlines on the tracing paper. Vintage patterns may come with small holes pre-punched into the pattern paper. These are for creating tailor's tacks, a type of basting where thread is sewn into the fabric in short lengths to serve as a guideline for cutting and assembling fabric pieces.

Besides illustrating the finished garment, pattern envelopes typically include charts for sizing, the number of pieces included in a pattern, and suggested fabrics and necessary sewing notions and supplies.

Ebenezer Butterick invented the commercially produced graded home sewing pattern in 1863 (based on grading systems used by Victorian tailors), originally selling hand-drawn patterns for men's and boys' clothing. In 1866, Butterick added patterns for women's clothing, which remains the heart of the home sewing pattern market today.

== Gallery ==
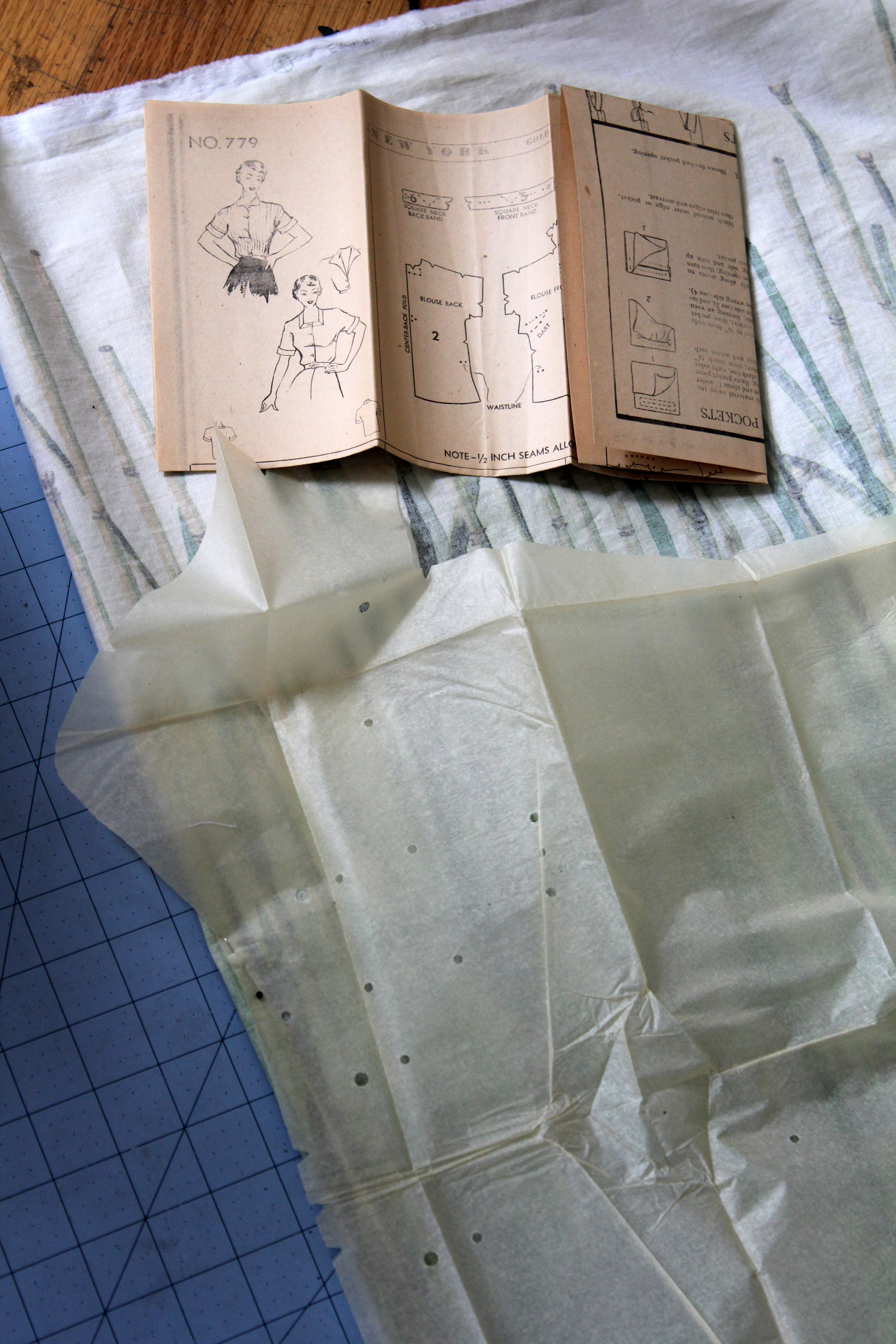
Vintage sewing pattern pieces, sold pre-cut

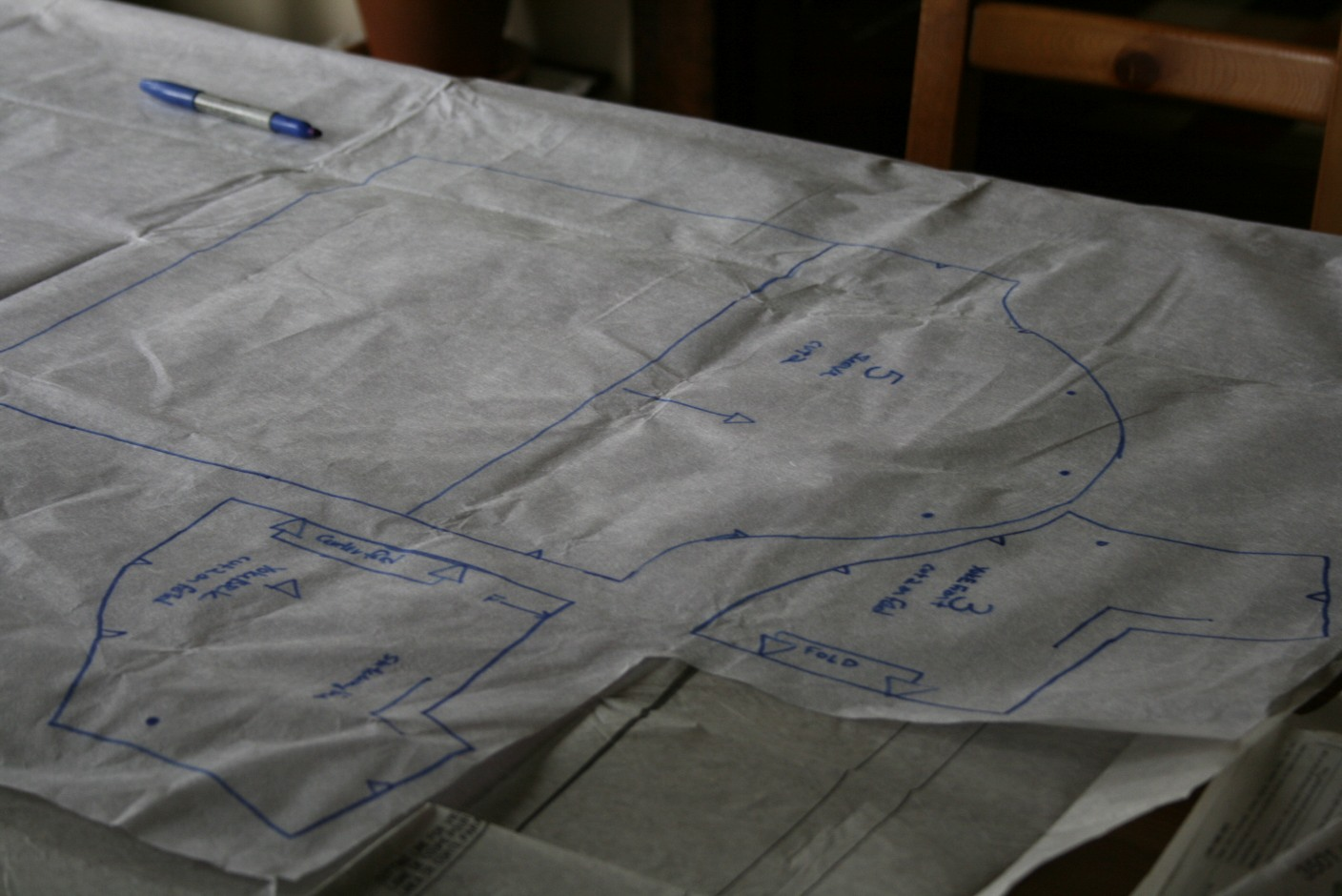
Tracing of a pattern

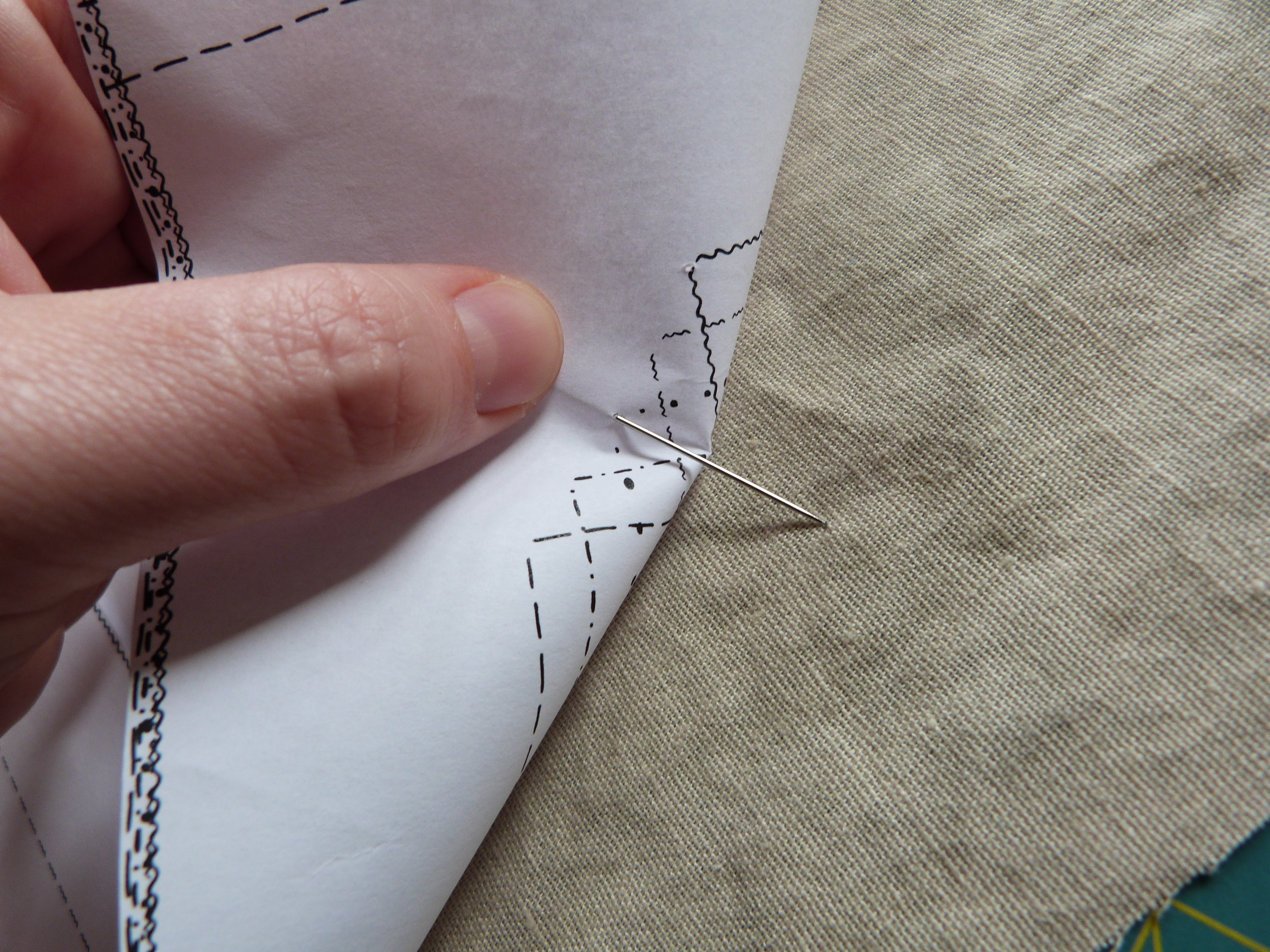
Sewing a tailor's tack with thread to mark a pattern on fabric before cutting the fabric

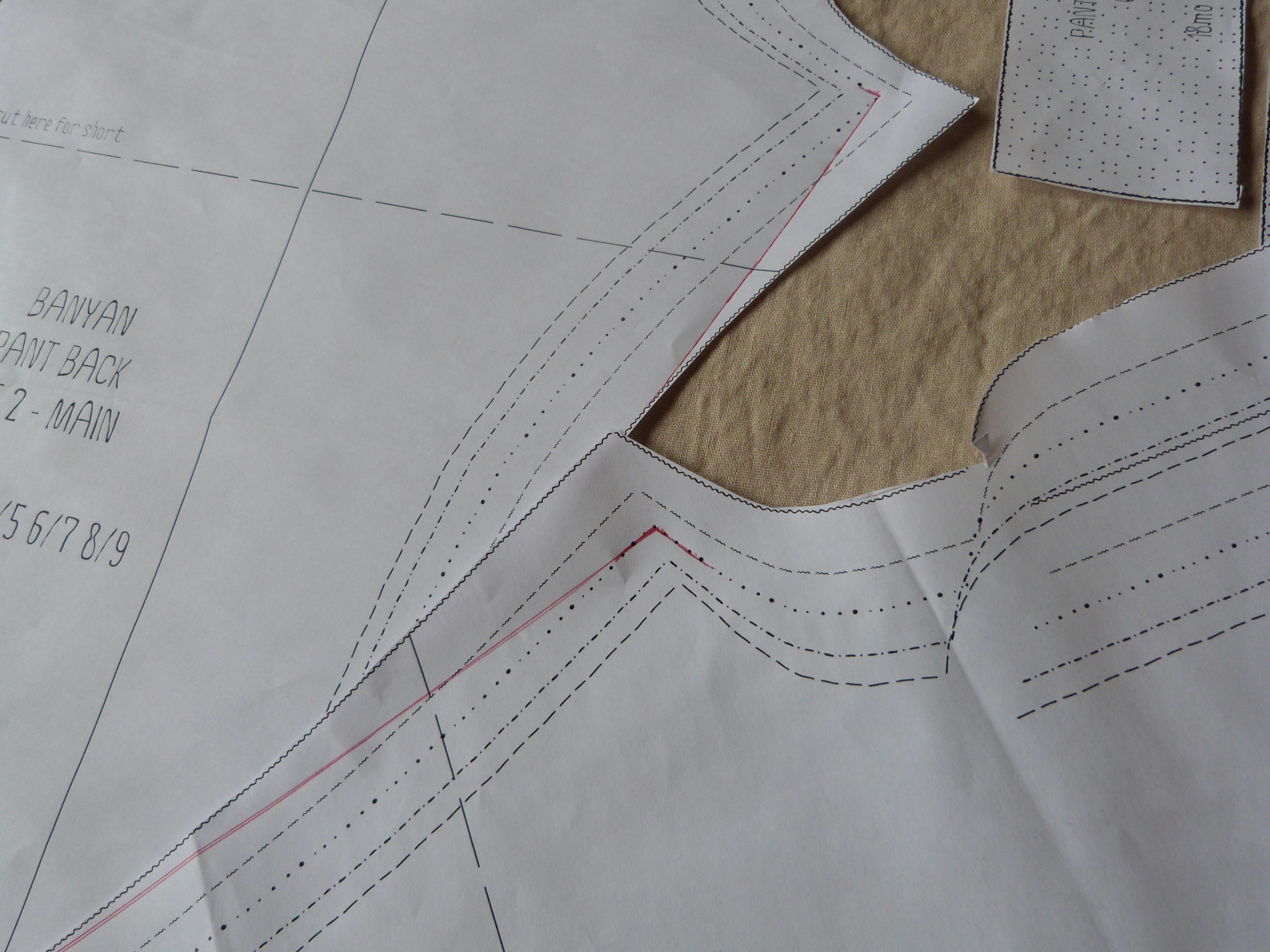
A sewer grades a pattern with red ink, to match measurements tailored to the person who will wear the garment.

== See also ==
- History of sewing patterns
- Ease
- French curve
- History of sewing patterns
- Sewing
- Sewing machine
- Tailor
- Dressmaker
- Clothing terminology
- Pattern companies
  - Butterick / McCalls
  - Burda
  - Clothkits
  - Grainline Studio
  - Simplicity
  - Tilly and the Buttons
  - Vogue
  - Wiksten
