= Pounce =

Pounce may refer to:

- Pounce (powder), a powder used to prevent ink from spreading and to blot up excess ink
  - Pouncing, a method of transferring images from one surface to another
- Pounce (mascot), Georgia State University's blue panther mascot
- Pounce, University of Wisconsin–Milwaukee's black panther mascot for the Milwaukee Panthers
- FC Gold Pride's cougar mascot
- Pounce (physics) or pop, in physics, the sixth derivative of the position vector with respect to time
- Pounce (Transformers), a character from the Transformers series
- The Pounce, a professional wrestling attack
- Pounce (card game), the card game known as Nerts or Nertz in America
- Pownce, a free social networking and micro-blogging site
