= Colossal Media =

Outdoor advertising company in Brooklyn, New York

- Industry: Outdoor advertising
- Founded: 2004
- Founders: Adrian Moeller and Paul Lindahl
- Key people: Kelly Peppers (CEO)
- Products: Murals and billboards painting
- Website: colossalmedia.com

Colossal Media is a hand-painted outdoor advertising company which operates billboards, sign paintings and mural paintings in the United States. The company was founded by Adrian Moeller and Paul Lindahl in 2004, and is headquartered in Brooklyn, New York. The company has over 100 locations in the United States. They reportedly create more than 400 to 500 murals yearly. Kelly Peppers is the CEO of the company.

== History ==
Colossal Media was founded in 2004 by advertising painter Paul Lindahl and, his friends and Mass Appeal magazine publishers, Adrian Moeller and late Patrick Elasik. The co-founders started the business from a garage in Park Slope area of Brooklyn painting murals for video games, beverages, and street artists. As of 2018, Colossal Media leased 120 walls in 100 locations in United States with 80 employees in all of its offices. By 2019, it was the leading hand-painted outdoor advertising company worldwide.

Colossal Media has worked with brands including Stella Artois, Apple, Nike, Coca-Cola, Google, Delta, Samsung and Gucci, artist Ed Ruscha and have also painted a mural for the cover of New York's 2016 Fall Preview issue.

== Process ==
Colossal Media's in-house creative studio breaks down the artwork using contour line work to separate form, value, and color. Then the artwork is scaled to the size of the wall, using a grid in a darkroom, and transferred onto large butcher paper using a pounce pen, which burns tiny holes anywhere a line is drawn. The painters, using suspended scaffolding or use scissor lifts and boom lifts, pounce the artwork on the wall by unrolling the previously made patterns and rubbing over the small holes with charcoal dust. This transfers the rough design onto the wall. Then the wall is painted using the custom-mixed colors by hand.
