= Tracing wheel =

Tool with multiple teeth on a wheel attached to a handle

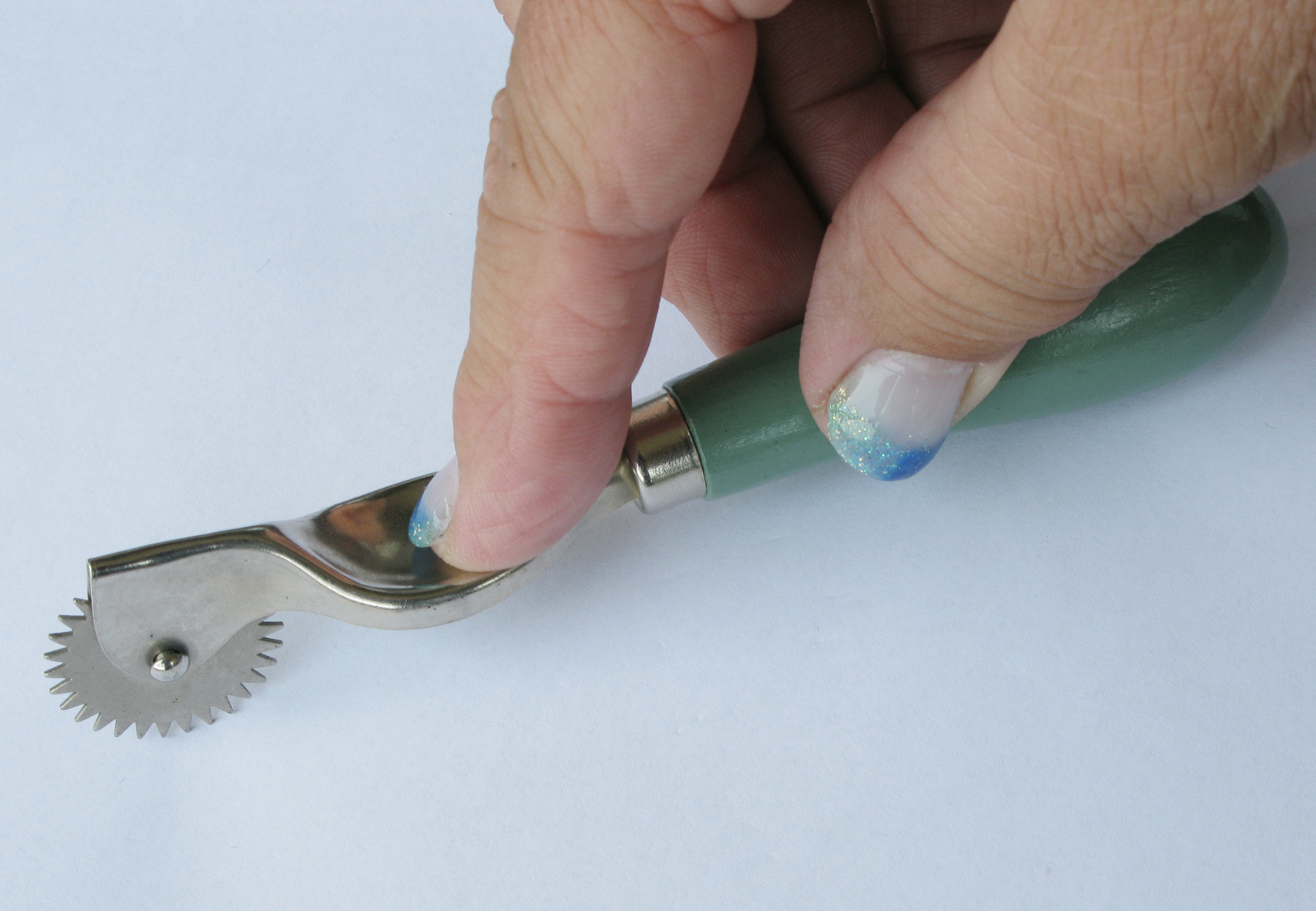
Some tracing wheels are serrated.

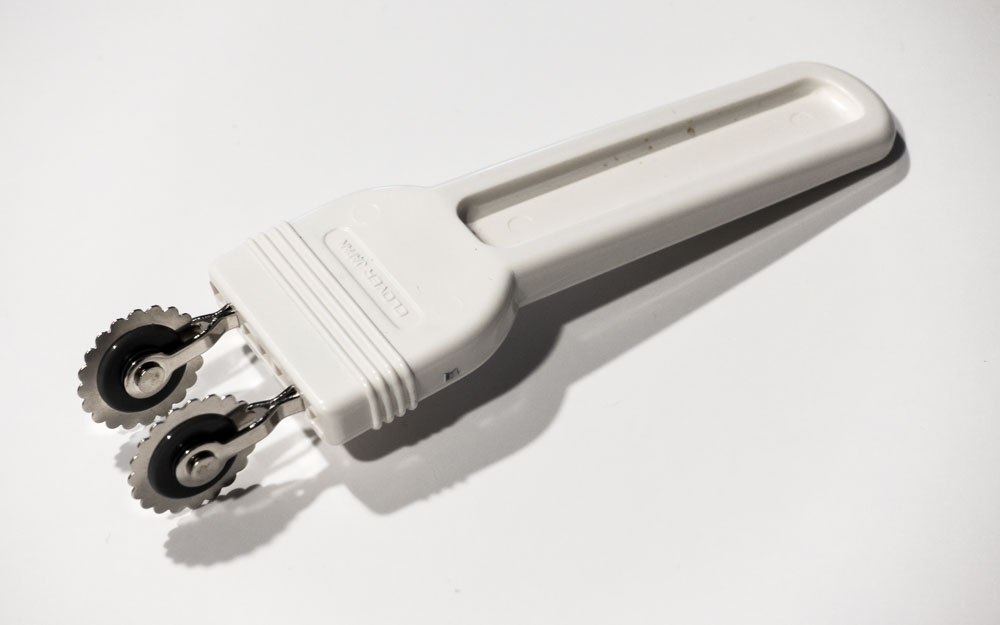
A double tracing wheel, with movable wheels set 3/4" apart

A tracing wheel, also known as a pattern wheel, pounce wheel, and dart wheel, is an instrument with multiple teeth on a wheel attached to a handle. The teeth can be either serrated or smooth. It is used to transfer markings from sewing patterns onto fabric with or without the use of tracing paper, and can be used to make slotted perforations. Such markings might include pleats, darts, buttonholes, notches or placement lines for appliques or pockets.

The double tracing wheel has two parallel wheels that can be positioned a variable distance apart. This tool can be used to transfer parallel pattern lines onto fabric, such as both the cutting line and the sewing line, where the distance between them is the seam allowance.

== See also ==
- Pattern notcher
- Wartenberg wheel
- Pizza cutter
- Pouncing
