= History of sewing patterns =

A sewing pattern is the template from which the parts of a garment are traced onto woven or knitted fabrics before being cut out and assembled. Patterns are usually made of paper, and are sometimes made of sturdier materials like paperboard or cardboard if they need to be more robust to withstand repeated use. Before the mid-19th century, many women sewed their own clothing by hand. Factory-produced fabrics were affordable and available in the early 19th century, but easy-to-use dress patterns and sewing machines for the home seamstress were not sold in the United States until the 1850s.

== Early publications ==
The earliest sewing patterns for the public were published in books, trade magazines, journals, and other periodicals. Full-size pattern sheets suitable for tracing were sometimes included in women's periodicals from around 1770 on. In 1808, The Lady's Economical Assistant was published in England, providing full-sized sewing patterns that could be traced. Other early publications included scaled drafts for dresses and headgear. Some of the earliest publications were intended for home dressmaking, while others were written for professional tailors and dressmakers.

Founded in 1828 in England, The Gentleman's Magazine of Fashion occasionally included pattern sheets in its issues, but patterns did not become a regular feature of the magazine until 1848, when descriptions and instructions were also included. In the following year, each issue included full-size tissue paper patterns, which could also be ordered through the mail.

Journal des Demoiselles, launched in France in 1833, provided scale drafts as well as full-size patterns. Cut-out tissue paper patterns were included around 1881.

In the United States, Report of Fashion and Mirror of Fashions was founded in 1827, and by 1840 included patterns for men's clothing.

From the 1830s on, shops in England advertised paper sewing patterns for sale, initially for professional dressmakers but also available for home sewers. Multiple publications that included pattern drafts were launched in England and France during the 1850s and 1860s. The Englishwoman's Domestic Magazine began including patterns as supplements in 1860, and also offered them through mail order.

In 1853, Godey's Lady's Book began offering patterns in each issue in the United States, and other periodicals soon followed its lead. William Jennings Demorest and Ellen Louise Demorest began publishing Mme. Demorest's Mirror of Fashion with full-sized patterns in 1861. Demorest Paper Patterns were also advertised in other women's magazines at the time.

By the 20th century, sewing patterns were marketed for home dressmakers as well as professionals, and available in magazines, catalogs, and in shops. The commercial paper pattern industry had begun to be a major influence in the clothing industry.

== Pattern companies ==
The first major manufacturer to offer tissue paper sewing patterns in graduated sizes was Ebenezer Butterick, a Massachusetts tailor.

Butterick launched The Butterick Company in 1863 to create heavy cardboard templates for children's clothing. Butterick's innovation was offering every pattern in a series of standard, graded sizes. Members of his family cut and folded the first patterns that were sold from their home. In 1866 Butterick began manufacturing patterns for women's fashions, and later added some articles of men's clothing. They began publishing the fashion magazine The Delineator in 1873 to publicize their patterns. Their patterns started as unprinted tissue paper cut to shape, folded and held together by a pinned (later pasted-on) label with an image and, later, brief instructions. In the early 1900s they began to use an envelope to hold the pattern. In the late 1910s they introduced a separate instruction sheet, called the "Deltor" (from the first three and last three letters of Delineator). In 1948, they purchased two new presses specially designed to print markings directly onto the pattern tissue.

James McCall, a Scottish tailor, established the McCall Pattern Company in 1870 in New York City. Patterns were unprinted until 1919, when they started printing information directly onto the pattern pieces. In the 1920s, selected patterns had full color illustrations on their pattern envelopes. In 1932 they started printing full color illustrations on all pattern envelopes. McCall usually printed the date of release on their envelopes (the only company which consistently did so before mid-century), which makes it easy to date their patterns.

Weldon's was the first major commercial pattern company in England, founded in 1879, and accompanied by a magazine to sell the patterns. Weldon's later added a Canadian edition of Weldon's Ladies' Journal with patterns. Weldon's continued to produce patterns into the 1950s.

Simplicity Pattern Co. Inc. started producing patterns in 1927. Their goal was to produce an easy-to-use, lower-priced pattern. They were one of the fastest growing pattern companies, opening offices in Canada, London, Australia, and several in the United States. Their patterns are sold in over 60 countries. Their unprinted patterns ended in 1946, and were all printed thereafter. DuBarry patterns were manufactured by Simplicity from 1931 to 1946 exclusively for F. W. Woolworth Company.

Vogue Pattern Service began in 1899, a spinoff of Vogue Magazine's weekly pattern feature. In 1909 Condé Nast bought Vogue. As a result, Vogue Pattern Company was formed in 1914, and in 1916 Vogue patterns were sold in department stores. In 1961, Vogue Pattern Service was sold to Butterick Publishing, which also licensed the Vogue name.

Hollywood Patterns was started by Condé Nast in 1932. These patterns were simplified versions of outfits worn in films by movie stars, many of whom were pictured on the pattern envelopes. They continued production through the end of World War II (1946).

The New York Pattern Company started in 1932 and continued until the early 1950s. They were unique in that the pattern sleeves had drawn characters rather than photos and the paper used was non-glossy.

Advance began manufacturing patterns in 1933, which was sold exclusively at JCPenney. The company continued through 1966 until it was sold to Puritan Fashions.

Fitzpatterns began offering downloadable sewing patterns in 2004. These consist of full-size patterns to be printed on a large format printer and or in a tiled version that can be printed and taped together.

Clothkits devised cut-and-sew clothing kits for home sewing that avoided the need for paper patterns. Clothkits printed designs and the pattern lines on fabric.
