= Pattern notcher =

Tool used in patternmaking and sewing

A pattern notcher is a common tool used in patternmaking and sewing that creates a notch in a paper pattern. Notches are used to align pattern pieces. Notches in the paper are more useful than marks on the paper as they allow the mark to be seen whether pattern paper is face up or face down.

== See also ==
- Tracing wheel
