= Wartenberg wheel =

Medical device for neurological use

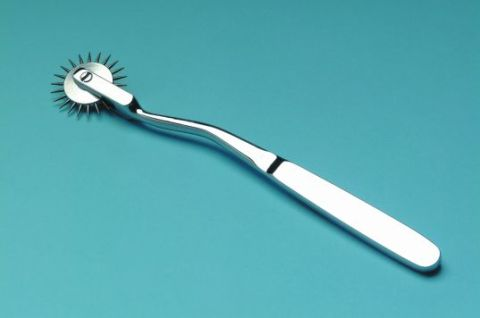
A Wartenberg wheel

A Wartenberg wheel, also called a Wartenberg pinwheel or Wartenberg neurowheel, is a medical device for neurological use. The wheel was designed to test nerve reactions (sensitivity) as it was rolled systematically across the skin. A Wartenberg wheel is generally made of stainless steel with a handle of approximately 18 centimetres (7 in) in length. The wheel, which has evenly spaced radiating sharp pins, rotates as it is rolled across the flesh. A disposable plastic version is available. Because of hygienic concerns, these devices are rarely used for medical purposes.

Robert Wartenberg, namesake of the Wartenberg wheel, is sometimes incorrectly credited as its inventor. According to Wartenberg himself, the device was in widespread use in Europe when he lived in Germany. While he did not invent it, he found it "an indispensable part of the outfit for everyday neurologic practice," and recommended its use to his colleagues in the US.

The Wartenberg wheel is also used as a sensation sex toy, and is often used to tickle a person (also called a ‘lee, short for “ticklee”) in the act of tickle fetishism. It is sometimes used in other settings while connected to a violet wand electrical device.

Clothing pattern-making can use a version of the Wartenberg wheel, called a pounce wheel, to transfer markings from paper to fabric. Pounce wheels resemble standard Wartenberg wheels in shape but have wooden or plastic handles.

== See also ==
- Rowel spur
- Tracing wheel
