= Pouncing =

Method of transferring a design

A pounce wheel, also known as a tracing wheel

Pouncing (Italian spolvero) is an art technique used for transferring an image from one surface to another using a fine powder called pounce. It is similar to tracing, and is useful for creating copies of a sketch outline to produce finished works.

== Art ==
Pouncing has been a common technique for centuries, used to create copies of portraits and other works that would be finished as oil paintings, engravings, and so on. The most common method involves laying semi-transparent paper over the original image, then tracing along the lines of the image by creating pricked marks on the top sheet of paper. This pounced drawing made of pricked holes is laid over a new working surface. A powder such as chalk, graphite or pastel is forced through the holes to leave an outline on the working surface below, thus transferring the image. The powder is applied by being placed into a small bag of thin fabric such as cheesecloth, then dabbed onto the pricked holes of the pounced drawing.

=== Examples of pouncing in art ===
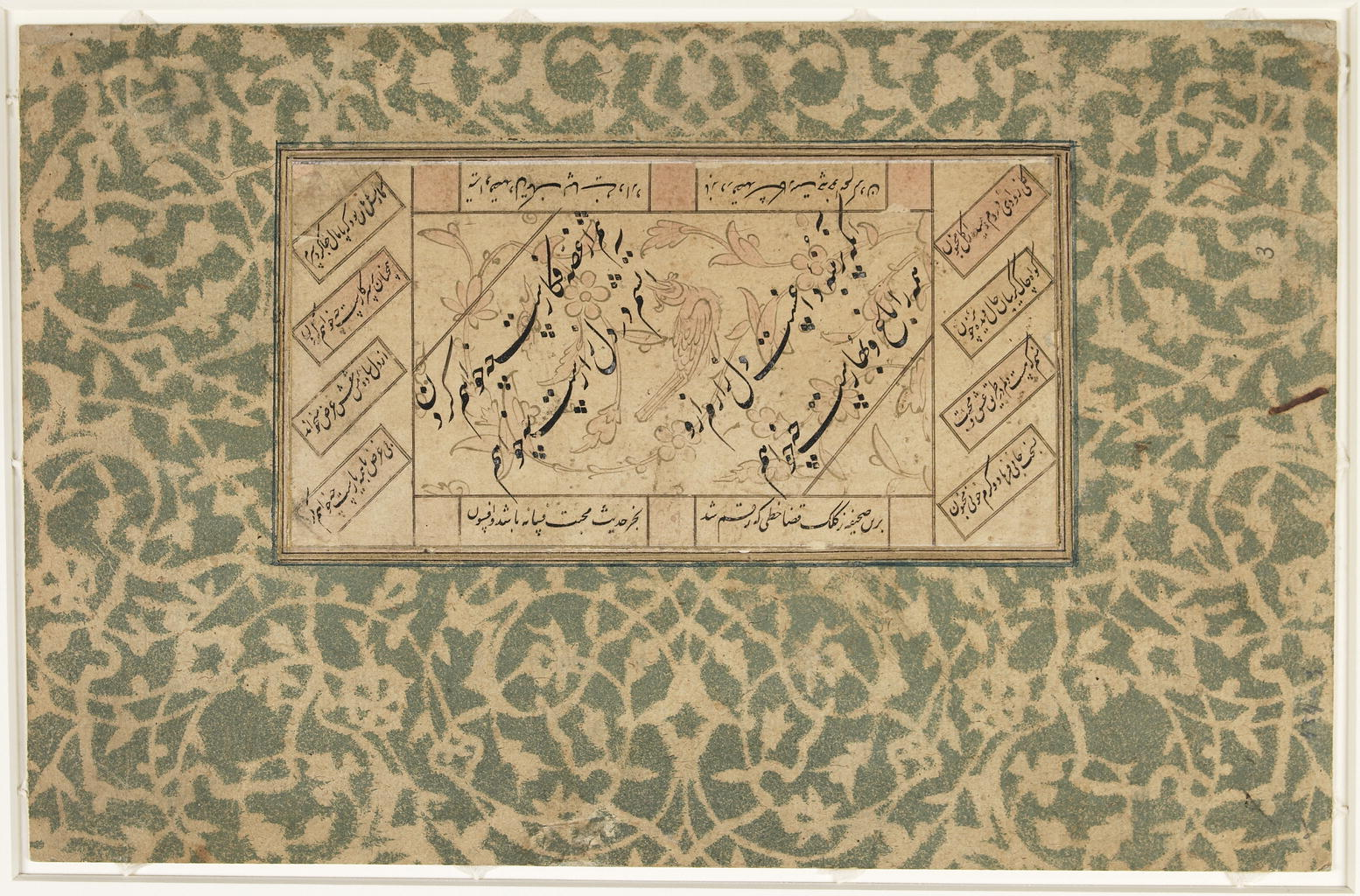
A calligraphy fragment, artist unknown, Iran, c. 1500–1600. (Note: Calligraphy in black nasta'liq script on a beige paper decorated with bird and leaf designs painted in gold. The main text panel is bordered by a number of other verses in both diagonal and vertical registers forming a frame. The entire composition is pasted to a larger sheet of paper decorated with a pounced vegetal motif in green and backed by cardboard.)

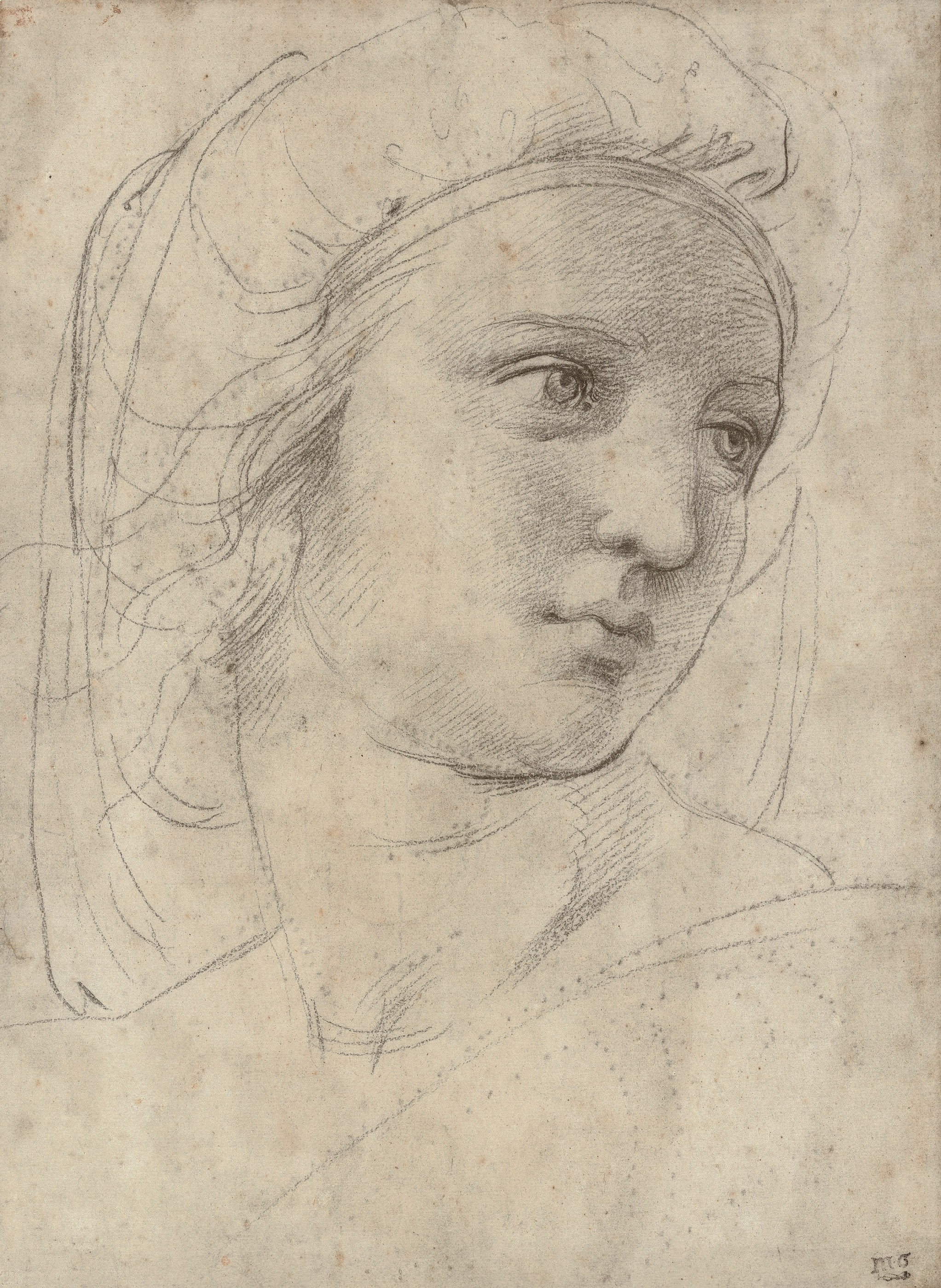
Head of a Muse by Raphaello Sanzio, Italy, c. 1490. (Note: Black chalk over pounce marks, traces of stylus, watermark of encircled Saint Anthony's cross.)

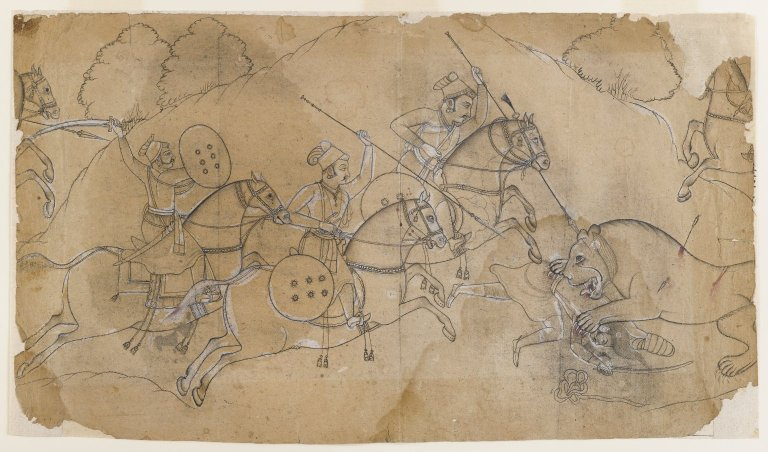
Lion Hunt, artist unknown, India, c. 1680. (Note: Ink and color on paper, pounced for transfer.)

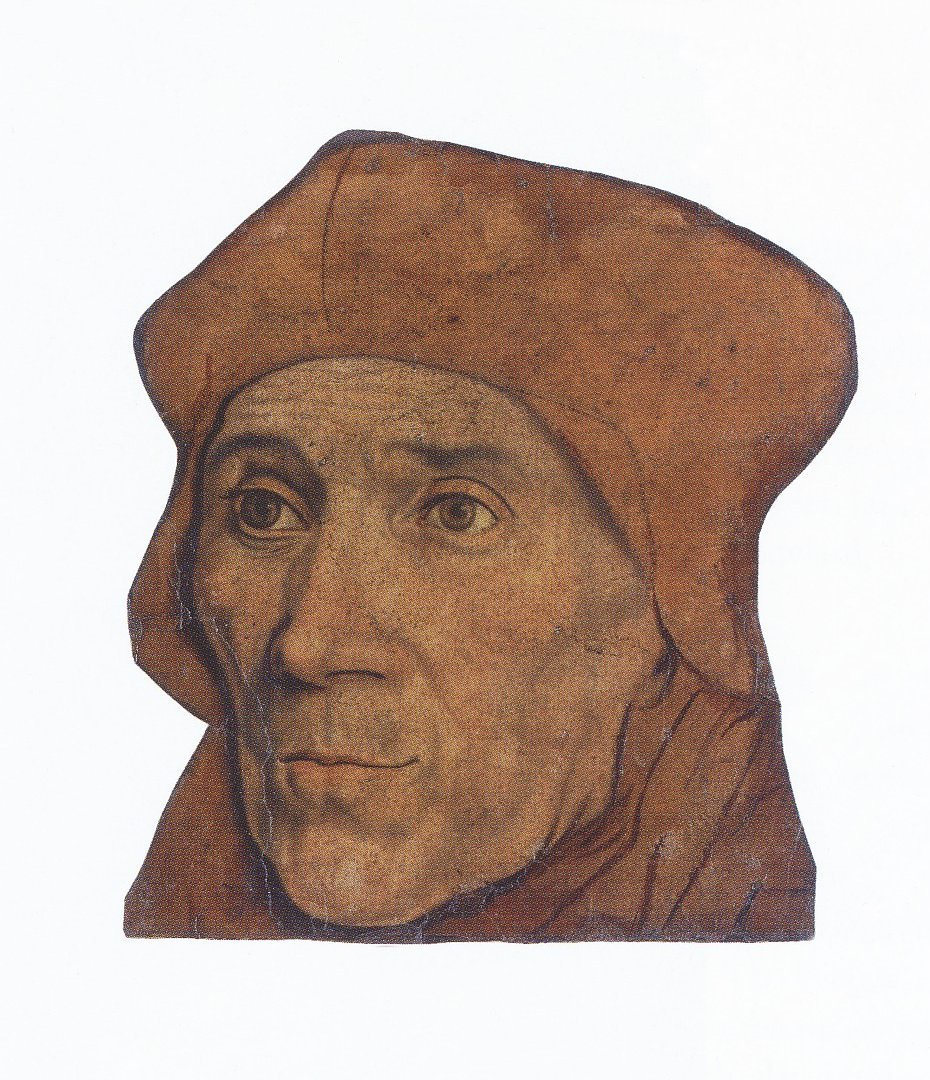
John Fisher, Bishop of Rochester, after Hans Holbein the Younger, England, c.1570s. (Note: The original drawing, which has been reinforced in ink and wash by other hands, was used as the pattern for a number of copies, including this example. Pounce marks on the outlines reveal that this copy was traced not from the original but from another copy. It was previously mounted on thin paper, which was cut out and stuck onto thicker paper.)

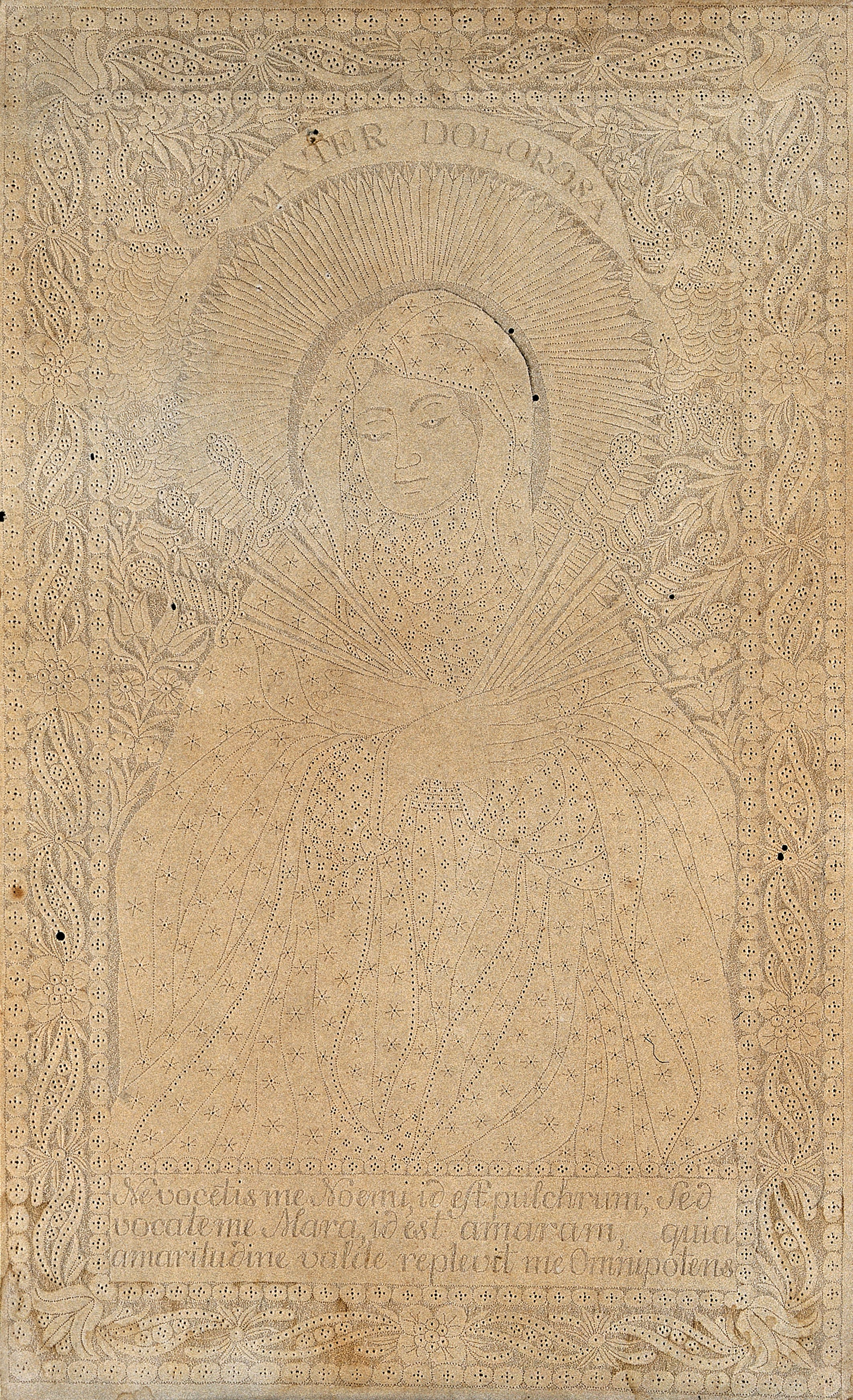
Saint Mary (the Blessed Virgin) as Virgin of the Seven Sorrows
(artist unknown)

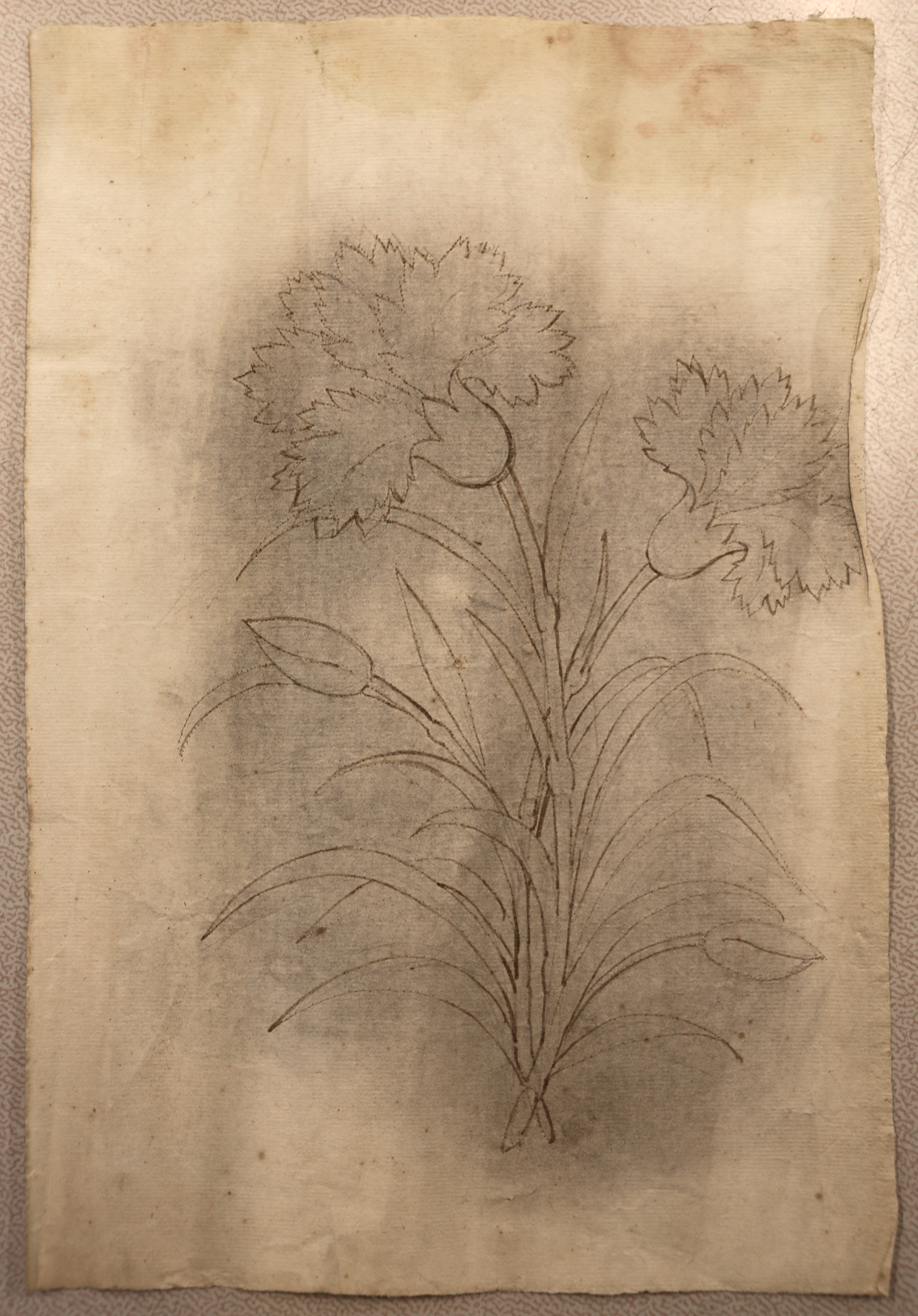
Paper sheet for pouncing of architectural decoration, Tuscany, 18th century

== See also ==
- Chalk
- Pastels
- List of art techniques
