= Butterick Publishing Company =

Publisher of sewing patterns and magazines

The Butterick Publishing Company was founded by Ebenezer Butterick to distribute the first graded sewing patterns. By 1867, it had released its first magazine, Ladies Quarterly of Broadway Fashions, followed by The Metropolitan in 1868. These magazines contained patterns and fashion news.

== History ==
=== 19th century ===
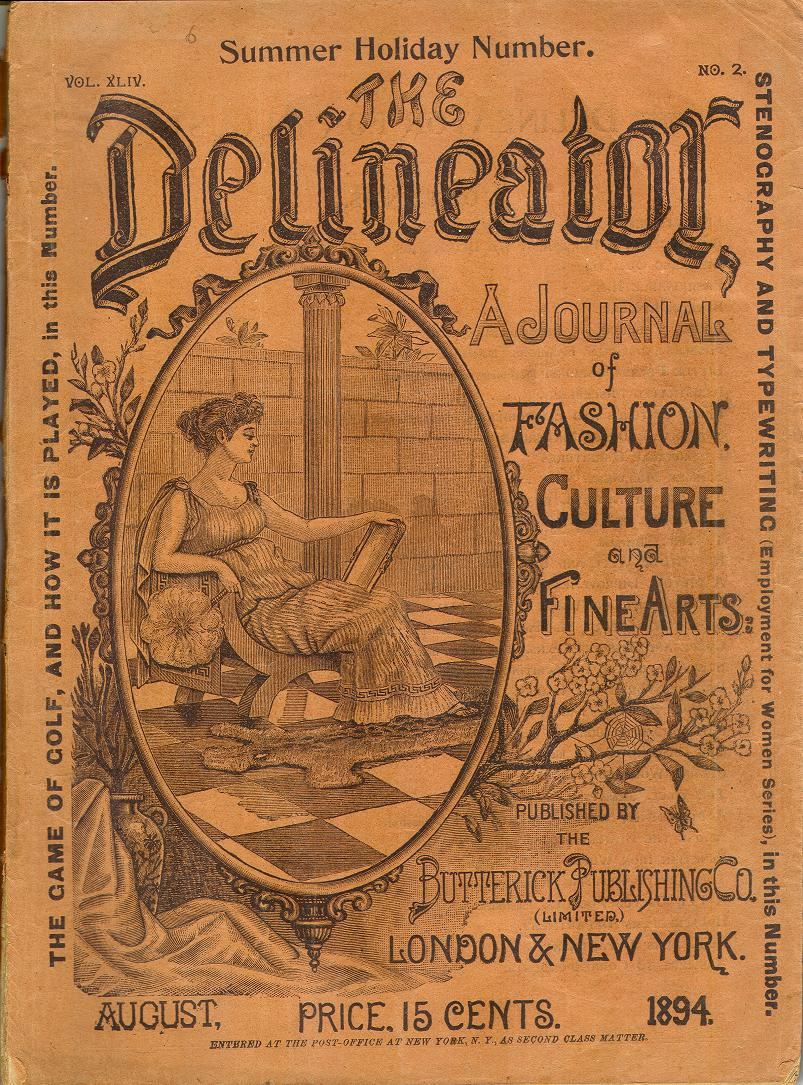
The Delineator, August 1894 cover

In the spring of 1867, E. Butterick and Co. began publishing Ladies Quarterly of Broadway Fashions. In 1868, the monthly magazine The Metropolitan began publication. Both magazines were aimed at women and served as a means to sell Butterick paper patterns via mail order.

In 1873, the two magazines were merged into a single publication, The Delineator. The magazine served as a marketing tool for Butterick patterns and discussed fashion and fabrics, including advice for home sewists.

By 1876, E. Butterick & Co. had become a worldwide enterprise selling patterns as far away as Paris, London, Vienna and Berlin, with 100 branch offices and 1,000 agencies throughout the United States and Canada.

=== 20th century ===
In 1903, the company built the Butterick Building at Spring Street and MacDougal Street (now Sixth Avenue) in Manhattan. The building, which still stands, is 16 stories tall and has an additional two stories underground. Parts of the building interior were designed by Louis Tiffany, and it housed the second largest printing plant in the world (second only to the Government Printing Office in Washington, D.C.).

In 1926, S.R. Latshaw was president of the Butterick Publishing Co.

One of Butterick's subsidiary companies was the Ridgway Company, which they purchased in 1909 and published the pulp magazines Romance, Everybody's Magazine, and Adventure. In 1914, after a 10-year lawsuit, the Ridgway Company was required to pay $17,000 to the editor of Financial World for libel.

=== After 1950 ===
In 1961, Butterick licensed the name and trademark Vogue Patterns from Condé Nast Publications, Inc. and purchased its pattern division. The company was purchased in 1967 by American Can Company and became a subsidiary renamed the Butterick Fashion Marketing Co. In the 1970s, sewing lost popularity and sales began to suffer. In 1983 Butterick's management group headed by Bill Wilson and John Lehmann purchased the company from American Can Company. William Proctor Wilson was the first chief executive officer of the privatized Butterick. In 1988 management sold approximately 60 percent of the company to Robert Bass's Acadia Investors. In 1988 Wilson was succeeded as chief executive officer by John Lehmann. In 2001, The McCall Pattern Company acquired Butterick and Vogue Patterns, and it still continued printing and marketing sewing patterns in and under all three lines as of the middle of February 2016. These continued to be sold from fabric and sewing-supplies stores like Jo-Ann Fabrics and Hancock Fabrics; Walmart commenced to offer them as well.

On May 30, 2025, the parent company of Simplicity, Butterick, McCall's, and Vogue pattern lines sold its US division, which owned the sewing pattern brands, to liquidation firm Hilco Capital. The parent company, IG Design Group, attributed the sale to recent tariffs, a softening market, and the bankruptcy of Joann.

On July 3, 2025, IG Design Group Americas, Inc., filed for Chapter 11 bankruptcy protection with plans to wind down and sell its assets. The four pattern lines were sold to Rubelmann Capital in September 2025. In October, Simplicity Patterns announced its relaunch as an employee-led brand.

== Children's patterns ==
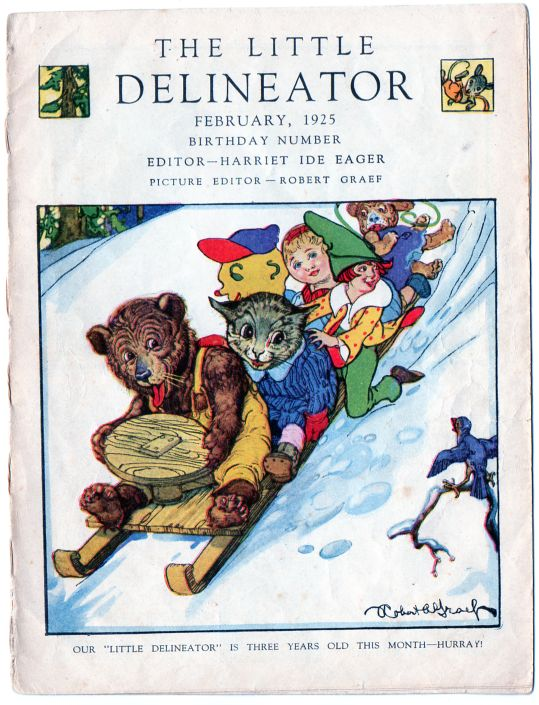
The Little Delineator, February 1925 Cover.

Butterick also published a series of pamphlets for children titled The Little Delineator. Designed for both boys and girls, the pamphlets featured eight pages of stories, artwork and contests. Each issue focused on a theme (often a holiday or season). They also featured play ideas (items to make), and on teaching morals and values. The series did not have a fashion focus as did The Delineator, but was more general in outlook. Each issue offered some kind of prize or reward and a Deli-Club membership card. The series did not contain advertising.
