= Simplicity Pattern =

American sewing pattern company

The Simplicity Pattern Company is a manufacturer of sewing pattern guides, under the "Simplicity Pattern", "It's So Easy" and "New Look" brands. The company was founded in 1927 in New York City. During the Great Depression, Simplicity allowed home seamstresses to create fashionable clothing in a reliable manner. The patterns are manufactured in the US but are distributed and sold in Canada, England, and Australia, in some markets by Burda and in Mexico and South Africa by third-party distributors. The company licenses its name to the manufacture of non-textile materials such as sewing machines, doll house kits, and sewing supplies. Simplicity Patterns is now owned by Rubelmann Capital.

== History ==
James J. Shapiro (1909–1995) founded the Simplicity Pattern Company in 1927 and was its first president. The company was based on an idea of his father's, Joseph M. Shapiro (1888, Borisov, Russia – 1968, La Jolla, California), a magazine ad salesman. The company at one point was considered part of the NYSE Nifty Fifty stocks.

In 1998, the company was acquired by Conso International Corp. Conso subsequently changed its name to Simplicity Creative Group, Inc. Until 2007, the company had its main plant in Niles, Michigan.

Simplicity Creative Group was acquired by Wilton Brands, Inc. in 2013, and sold in November 2017 to CSS Industries, who in turn were acquired in January 2020 by IG Design Group plc, via their American subsidiary Design Group Americas, Inc.

In June, 2025, the parent company of Simplicity, Butterick, McCall's, and Vogue pattern lines was sold to liquidation firm Hilco Capital. IG Design Group attributed the sale to recent tariffs, a softening market, and the bankruptcy of Joann.

On July 3, 2025, IG Design Group Americas, Inc., filed for Chapter 11 bankruptcy protection with plans to wind down and sell its assets. The four pattern lines were sold to Rubelmann Capital in September 2025. In October, Simplicity Patterns announced its relaunch as an employee-led brand.

== Sewing from patterns ==
Simplicity Patterns, like most home sewing patterns, consist of tissue paper printed with numerical guides and instructions. The paper is pinned on the fabric, and the sewer then cuts along the printed lines and stitches the cloth together to create the finished clothing. Each Simplicity pattern has step-by-step instructions for cutting, stitching, and assembling of clothes. Simplicity aims to emulate fashion designer clothing, and the company currently produces over 1,600 patterns.
