= Seam allowance =

Area between the fabric edge and stitching line on materials being sewn together

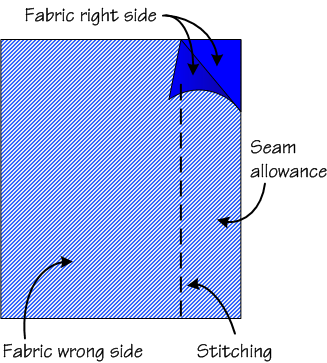
Parts of a plain seam

Seam allowance (sometimes called inlays) is the area between the fabric edge and the stitching line on two (or more) pieces of material being sewn together. Seam allowances can range from 1/4 inch (6.4 mm) wide to as much as several inches. Commercial patterns for home sewers have seam allowances ranging from 1/4 to 5/8 inch (6.4 to 15.9 mm).

A 5/8 inch (1.5 cm) seam allowance provides enough extra between the seam line and the cut edge of the fabric to make sure that the fabric will be safely caught as they are being joining together. This is particularly important when working with fabrics that ravel easily.

Sewing industry seam allowances range from 1/4 inch (6.4 mm) for curved areas (e.g. neck line, armscye) or hidden seams (e.g. facing seams), to 1 inch (25 mm) or more for areas that require extra fabric for final fitting to the wearer (e.g. center back). Curved seams generally have a smaller seam allowance than straight seams; bulky seams with a large amount of seam allowance are more difficult to press into or conform to a curved shape.
