= Tailor =

Person who makes, repairs, or alters clothing professionally

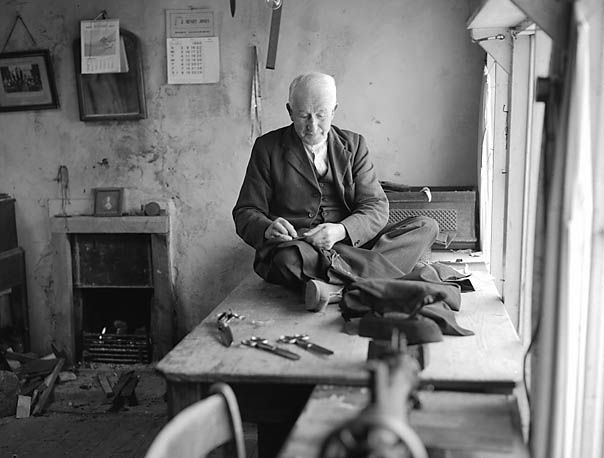
1955 photo of a tailor at work in Wales

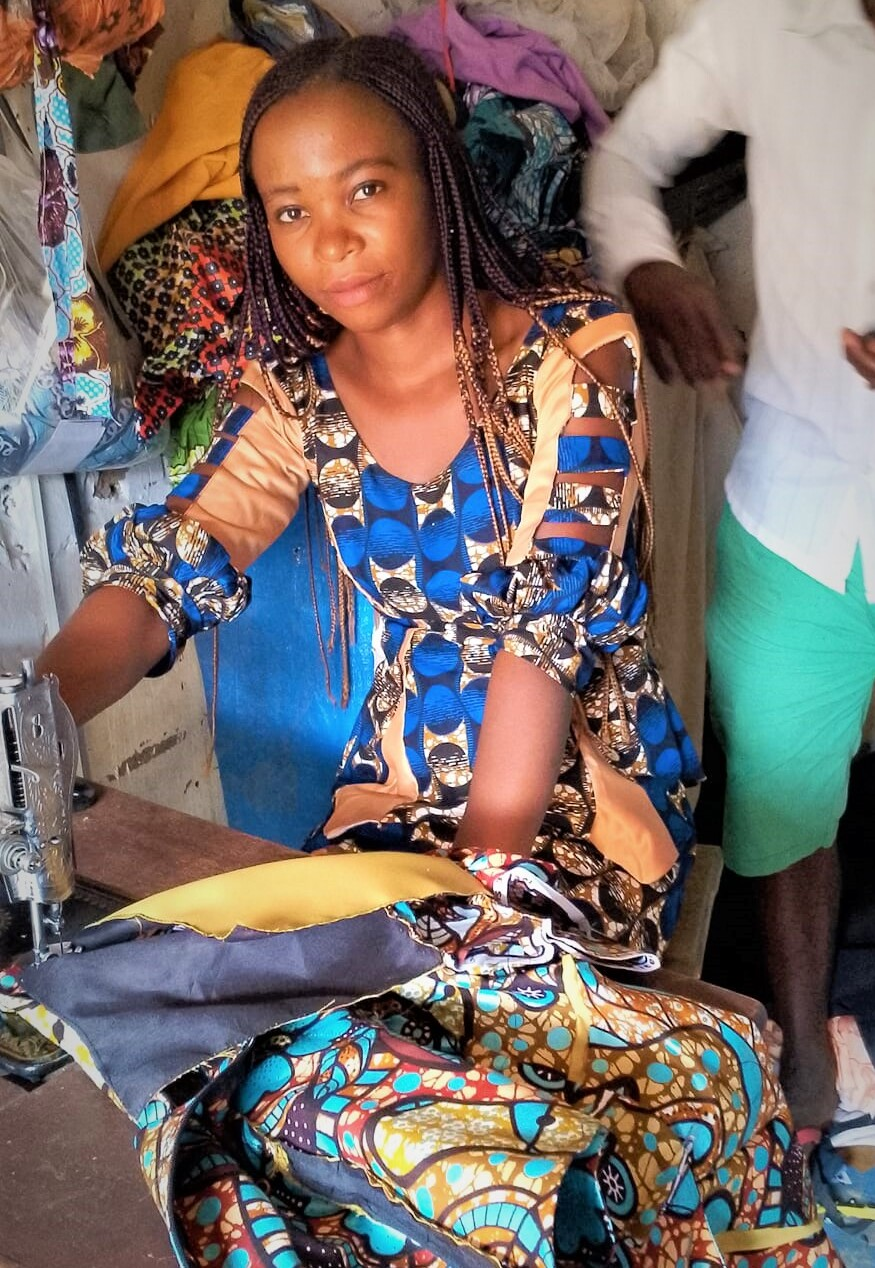
Fuliiru tailor in the Democratic Republic of Congo

A tailor is a person who makes or alters clothing, particularly men's clothing. The Oxford English Dictionary dates the term to the thirteenth century.

== History ==
Although clothing construction goes back to prehistory, there is evidence of tailor shops in Ancient Greece and Rome, as well as tailoring tools such as irons and shears. The profession of tailor in Europe became formalized in the High Middle Ages through the establishment of guilds. Tailors' guilds instituted a system of master craftsmen, journeymen, and apprentices. Guild members established rules to limit competition and establish quality standards. In 1244, members of the tailor's guild in Bologna established statutes to govern their profession and required anyone working as a tailor to join the guild.

In England, the Statute of Artificers, passed in 1563, included the profession of tailor (Note: In the 1563 Statute of Artificers, the profession was spelled Taylours.) as one of the trades that could be entered only by serving a term of apprenticeship, typically seven years.

A typical tailor shop would have a master, a foreman, several journeymen, and apprentices. The apprentices, often beginning their training as young adolescents and indentured to the master by their parents (for a fee), performed menial tasks such as cleaning, managing the fires to heat the pressing-irons, running errands, and matching fabric and trims. Apprentices were also taught the "tailor's posture", to sit cross-legged on a raised board or bench while they sewed. A tailoring establishment then generally consisted of a well-appointed room in which the master would measure customers. Cutting, sewing, buttonholes, and finishing work were performed in adjoining rooms.

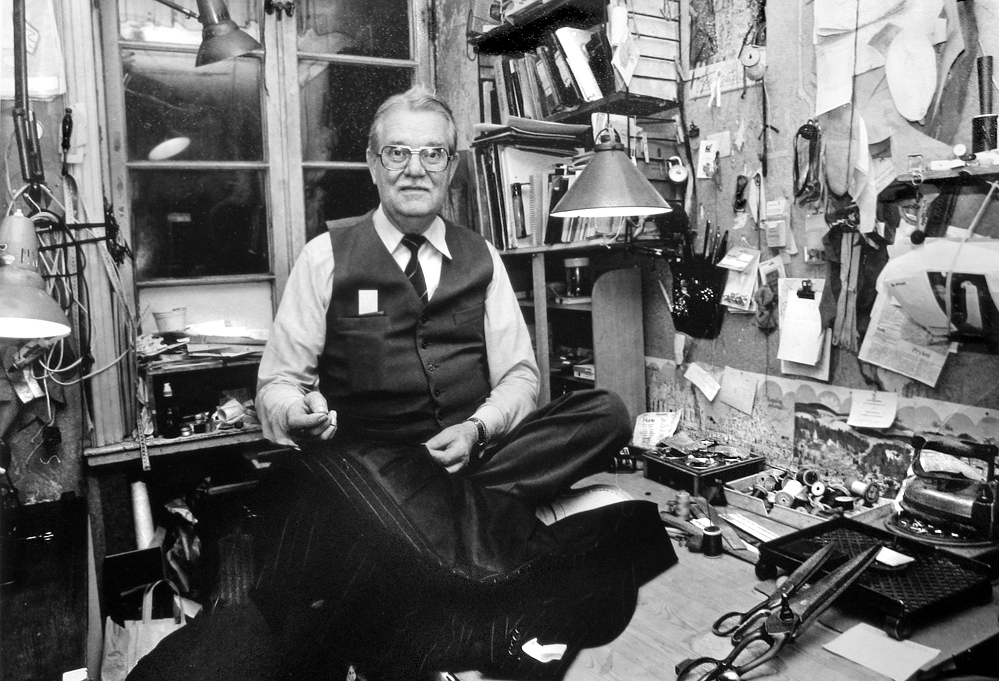
Master Tailor Agne Wideheim (1918–2007), Sweden, in the tailor's posture

In England, there were many negative associations with the profession of tailoring. Tailors were often called "snips", "bodkins", "thimbles", "shreds", "stiches" [sic], and "geese" (referring to the tailor's "goose" or iron). In William Shakespeare's plays, a tailor was variously called a "thread", a "thimble", and a "rag". By reputation, tailors were generally presumed to drink to excess and to have effeminate tendencies (likely because of the view of sewing as a woman's activity). Tailors were presumed to be physically weak and to have delicate constitutions. It was commonly asserted that their diets consisted of cabbage. (Note: Historically, tailors often supplemented their income with leftover fabric scraps, called "cabbage" in the trade.) In comics, they were portrayed as cuckolds or henpecked husbands. A common saying at the time was "Nine tailors make a man".

As with other artisanal trades, tailors relied on the "house of call" or "call houses", a trade club at which they could procure workmen. Sometimes, a skilled journeyman assigned by the call house would be taken on permanently by the master. Master tailors who failed to comply with laws of wages or hours could lose access to the call houses, and journeymen whose work was reported as poor could be removed from the call book. Many tailors became virtually blind from the extensive hours of stitching by hand with only candelight to illumine the work. The call for tailoring peaked in the winter, and tailors were often unemployed for several months over the summer.

During the 18th century, the profession began to shift toward large-scale and specialized production. A hierarchy of skills resulted, with the most prestigious level reserved for those who cut the cloth. "Mere sewers" ranked below the "cutters". More respect was given to those who worked in a master's workshop than those who took in piecework in their own home. Tasks grew more specialized; by the end of the century, one individual might focus solely on collars and sleeves.

The trade was one of the first in England to exhibit labor disputes, with tailors frequently on strike against lengthy working hours, low wages, and the use of laborers outside the workshop such as women and children. The strikes generally failed; some participants were imprisoned or transported to America or Australia. The unrest eventually influenced Parliament to establish rules for wages, hours, and working conditions in the tailoring industry. Tailors were one of the first trades in England to form a labor union.

The British census in 1851 identified 152,672 tailors, more than the entire railway industry at the time, and that number increased throughout the century. (Note: The 1851 census identified 63,496 individuals engaged in the railway industry, including clerks, drivers, and station attendants.) By then, living and working conditions of many tailors had deteriorated, but the trade was still the fourth largest of London professions. One factor was the growing availability and popularity of "slops": cheap ready-made clothing. (Note: The term "slops" had previously referred specifically to sailors' clothing and bedding.) Another was a shift from the vast majority of tailors being engaged in workshops to most working outside the shops of employers. Master tailors who relied on outside workers saved themselves the costs of lighting and heating, as well as some supplies. Rather than pay for foremen to supervise the work, masters would fine the outside workers for inferior products. Using outside workers also freed masters from the legal constraints that dictated hours and wages. Tailors who worked outside workshops began to use their wives and family members in manufacturing garments, which increased their production to maximize their incomes. Some tailors would subcontract aspects of the work to laborers. The house of call system was abandoned. When the Statute of Artificers was repealed in 1814, it abolished the apprenticeship requirement and so tailors could no longer control admission to the trade. Tailor strikes in 1827 and 1834 were largely motivated by opposition to employing women as outworkers. Unlike other industries, in which technological advances contributed to decline of trades, the changes to the work methods in the tailoring industry that led to its decline had occurred several decades before the development of the mechanical sewing machine.

== Tailoring ==
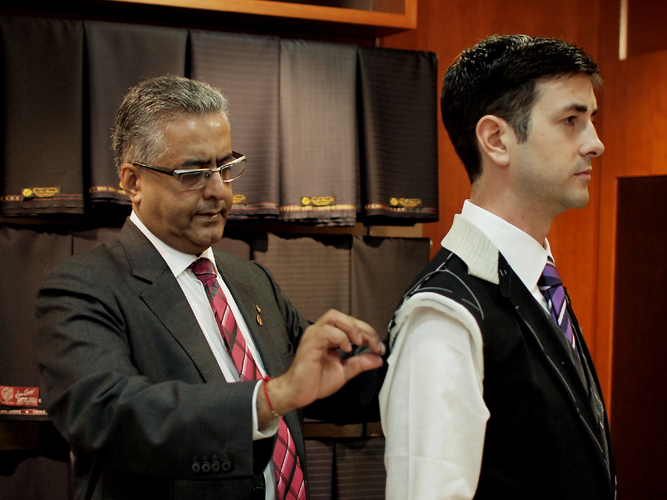
A bespoke suit requires a “skeleton fitting” in which the garment is only partially made in order to correct minor deficiencies in fit

Tailoring men's jackets by adding underlayers of padding became fashionable in Europe by the 14th century. Over the years, additional areas were padded to provide an understructure that helped the garment lie neatly on the body. By the 19th century, well-tailored garments were carefully fit to the wearer with a more subtly shaped understructure. Even with the advent of modern machines, nearly 75 percent of a custom-tailored suit's stitching is still done by hand.

The earliest extant work on cutting by tailors is from Spain in 1580. Juan de Alcega, a Spanish tailor in the 16th century, published Libro de Geometría, practica, y traça (Book on Geometry, Practice, and Pattern) (Note: A copy of the 1589 edition of Alcega's book is housed at the National Art Library in London.) which documented methods of laying out patterns to achieve the most economical use of the fabric. Alcega illustrated 163 patterns to scale in 23 categories of men's and women's garments.

Master tailors used proprietary methods for creating their clothing patterns. Up until approximately 1790, patterns to be used for cutting were considered trade secrets to be exclusively owned by the masters. By the late 18th century, publications that not only printed patterns but also gave directions for cutting and layout were widely available.

In addition to patterns and templates, some master tailors and cutters use the rock of eye method of cutting: which is a freehand way of drafting a pattern by trusting your eye and experience rather than focusing on numbers. Instead of using pencil to draft the pattern, the rock of eye typically involves chalk to mark.

== Regional styles ==
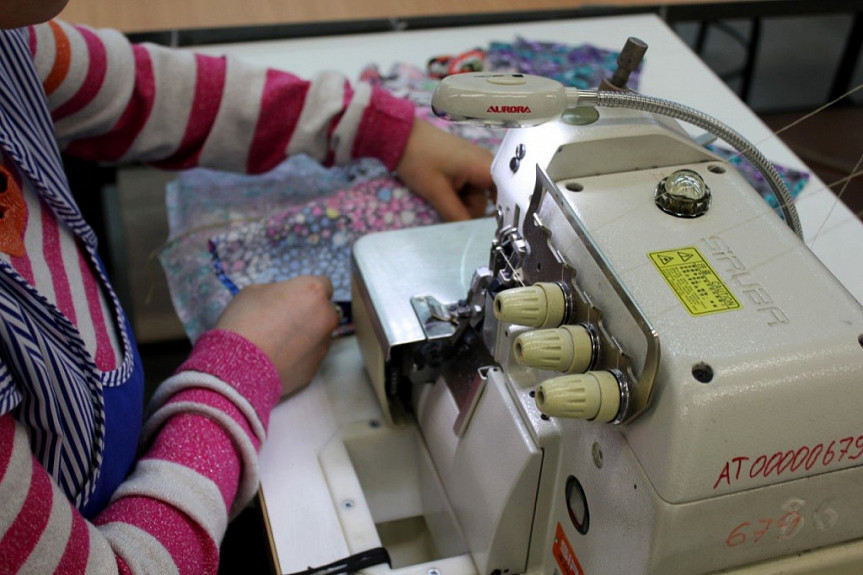
Seamstress at work. Buryatia, Russia

Just as there are various methods of tailoring, there are also styles that differ regionally. This is due to different climates and cultures in the world, causing "house style" cuts of the trade.

=== British cut ===
The silhouette of a British cut suit is influenced by military tailoring, with a defined waist and shoulders. The target image is that of an upper-class gentleman.

The British cut of tailoring can be defined by various ways of inner construction. Since the United Kingdom has a cooler climate than (for example) the Mediterranean, the cut of the British is heavier, and bears a greater military influence. This style of canvassing has 3 layers, a wool or camel-hair canvas for the body, a horsehair chest piece for the breast area, and a flannel domette for a more masculine pronounced bulk. The shoulders of the British are more heavily padded. The fabrics used by the British are in the range of 9–13 oz due to the colder climate. This style of cut can be credited to Henry Poole & Co, and H. Huntsman & Sons. The British are also credited in creating their ever-so-popular trademark, the Drape cut, credited to Frederick Scholte who trained the founders of Anderson & Sheppard.

=== Italian cut ===
An Italian cut suit offers a flattering shape with soft tailoring, aiming for the most attractive appearance for the wearer. A suit jacket in northern Italy will usually have a square shoulder, while in southern Italy, the Neapolitan tailoring preference is for a more natural shoulder.

Like the British cut, the Italian cut is defined by its inner construction. Since Italy lies in southern Europe and has a warm climate, the Italian tailors developed a cut that was light and cooler to coincide with the conditions. What they developed is called the Italian/European cut. This cut is more light, with fabrics ranging from 7–9 oz. This way of doing canvas has a range of 1-2 layers, a linen body canvas, and a light horsehair canvas. The Italian shoulder is more natural, and sometimes has a "shirt sleeve" with a roping head. The cut is also slimmer than the British, with a more casual setting. Cesare Attolini invented the lighter Neapolitan construction. The tailors credited with popularizing these cuts include Brioni and Rubinacci.

Bespoke suits created by an Italian tailor are called su misura. The average cost of a su misura suit is between €1,700 and €3,000, although one might cost more than €5,000 from the finest tailoring houses. A master tailor can create a suit in approximately 40 hours. The number of tailors in Italy decreases at a rate of 8 percent annually, with fewer than 750 tailors as of 2016.

=== American cut ===
The American cut of tailoring is a mix of the Italian and the British ways. The American cut is more baggy and full, with a natural shoulder that is lightly padded. American tailoring usually involves doing light canvas, where only the canvas and the flannel domette are used. The most well-known cut developed by the Americans is the Ivy League cut. The tailors credited with this cut remain anonymous.

== See also ==
- Bespoke tailoring
- Made-to-measure
