= Pounce (powder) =

Powder used to dry writing ink

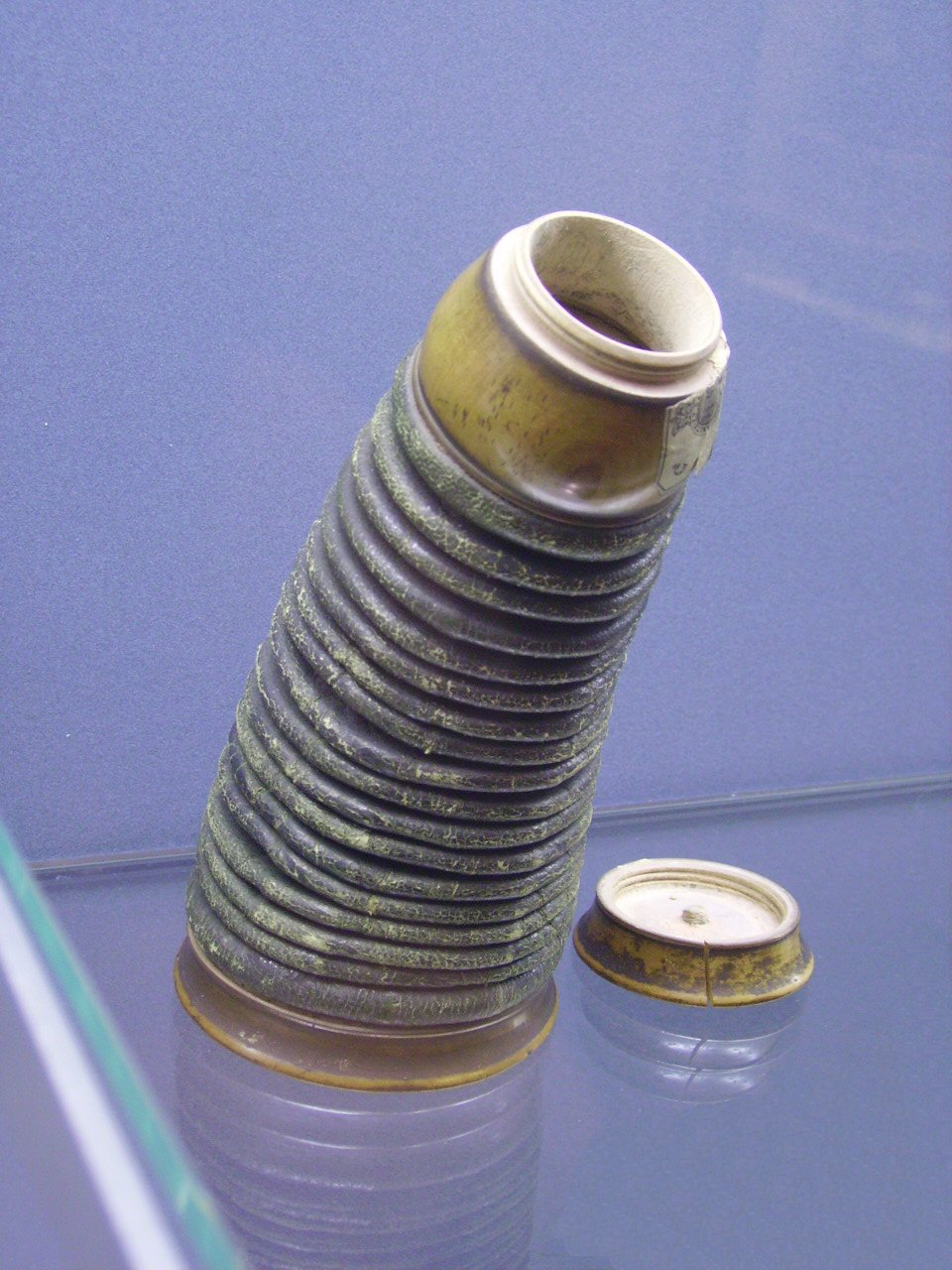
A pounce pot (or sprinkler) at the London Science Museum

Pounce (Note: From French "ponce", from Latin "pūmex", doublet of "pumice".) or sand (Note: From "sandarac" resin (Tetraclinis articulata).) is a fine powder, most often made from powdered cuttlefish bone or sandarac resin, that was used both to dry ink and to sprinkle on a rough writing surface to make it smooth enough for writing. This was especially needed if the paper came "unsized", that is, lacking the thin gelatinous material used to fill the surface of the paper and make it smooth enough for writing with a quill or a steel nib. It was also used to prepare the surface when drafting with Rapidograph pens on mylar, a common drafting medium in the late twentieth century.

== History ==
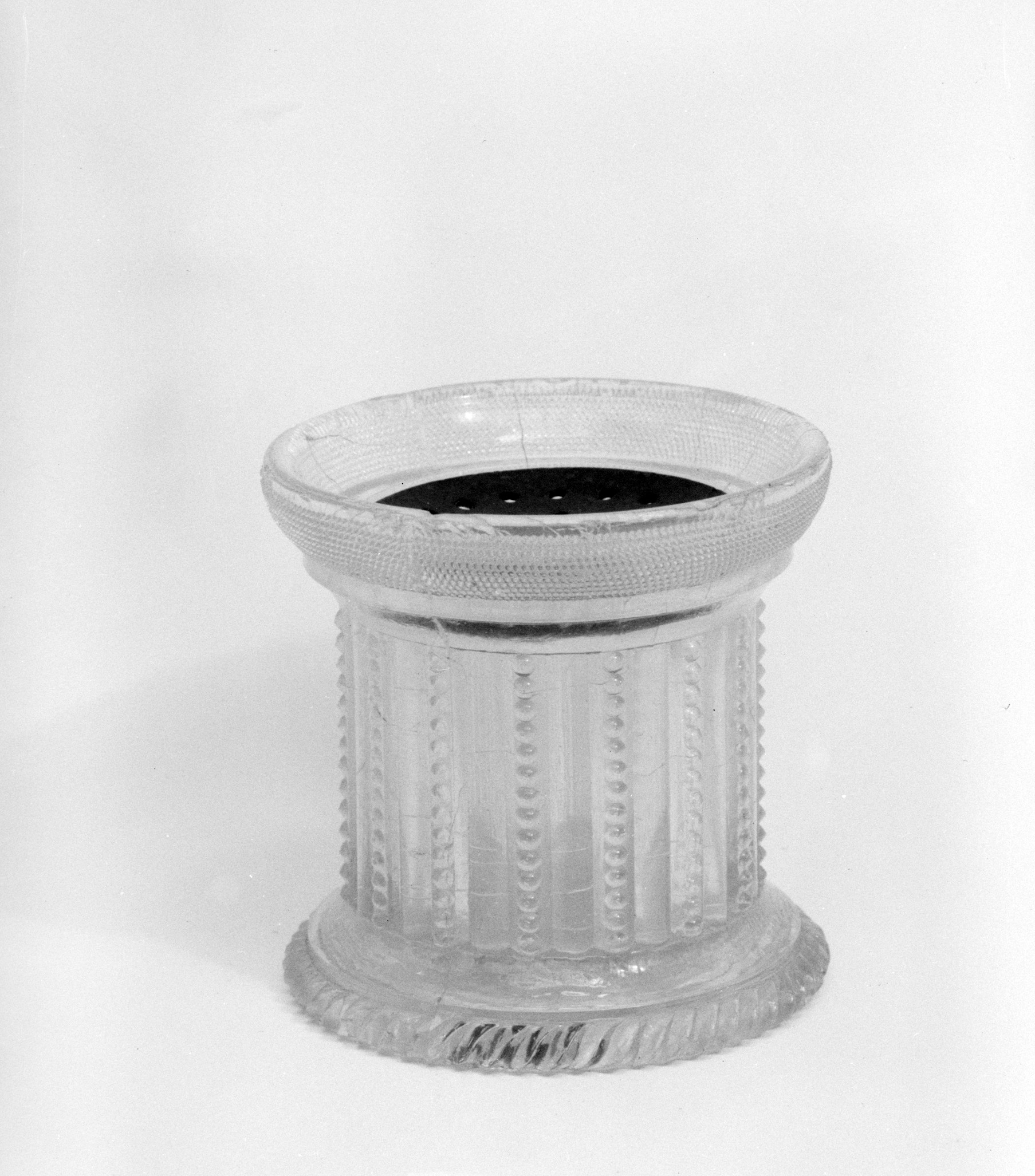
Glass sand shaker, c. 1840

In the 19th century, the pounce pots or sanders often had a shallow dish around the top so that pounce or sand could be returned to the pot and reused. The process is very effective for quickly drying ink, and although blotting paper has been available since the Tudor period, pounce or sand continued to be used throughout the nineteenth century because it was often cheaper.

== Application ==
=== Handwriting and calligraphy ===
Pounce is gently sprinkled all over the writing on the paper. When using a quill or a steel nib, and with inks that are made up to match those typically in use during the 18th and 19th centuries, and provided the pen has been used with the fine strokes typical of handwriting of that period, the handwriting will be sufficiently dry within 10 seconds to allow the paper to be folded without blotting. Gently vibrating the paper whilst the pounce or sand is on it ensures that little or no pounce or sand sticks to the handwriting and excess sand or pounce is shaken off before folding the paper.

=== Art and embroidery ===
"Pricking and pouncing" is a transfer technique that uses a stencil with fine holes, often made by pricking a template using a pounce wheel, to apply a fine powder that contrasts with the fabric. The pounce is dusted over, giving a temporary pattern through use of the stencil. Chambray would use charcoal on the light side, and chalk on the dark side of the fabric.

== See also ==
- pouncet-box - a box for sprinkling pounce
