= List of women innovators and inventors by country =

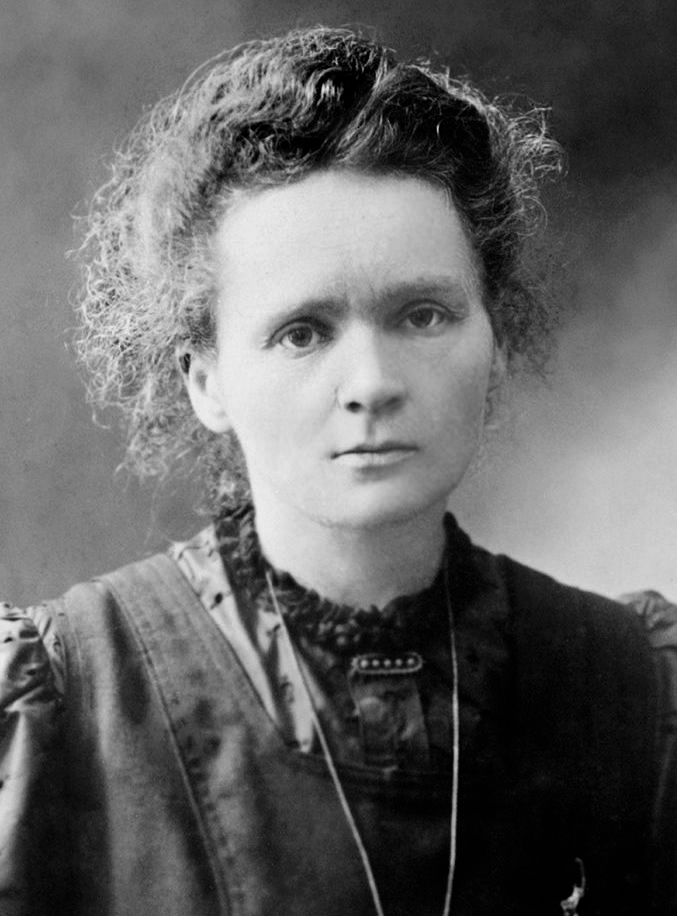
Marie Curie (1867–1934), pioneering research into radioactivity

Women inventors have been historically rare in some geographic regions. For example, in the UK, only 33 of 4090 patents (less than 1%) issued between 1617 and 1816 named a female inventor. In the US, in 1954, only 1.5% of patents named a woman, compared with 10.9% in 2002. Women's inventions have historically been concentrated in some areas, such as chemistry and education, and rare in others, such as physics, and electrical and mechanical engineering. Some names such as Marie Curie and Ada Lovelace are widely known, many other women have been active inventors and innovators in a wide range of interests and applications.

The following is a list of notable women innovators and inventors displayed by country.

== Australia ==
- Rose Cumming (1884–1968), innovative interior decoration
- Sally Dominguez (born 1969), modular rainwater tank
- Minnie Crabb (1885–1974), braille printing press
- Myra Juliet Farrell (1878–1957), tailoring devices, fruit picker, folding pram hood
- Melissa George (born 1976), style snaps
- Veena Sahajwalla (fl 2010s), green steel
- Alison Todd (fl 1990s), pathogen detection

== Austria ==
- Slawa Duldig (1901–1975), folding umbrella
- Ingeborg Hochmair (born 1953), medical devices, cochlear implants
- Lise Meitner (1878–1968), radioactivity, nuclear physics
- Margarete Schütte-Lihotzky (1897-2000), Frankfurt kitchen
- Helene Winterstein-Kambersky (1900-1966), waterproof mascara

== Belgium ==
- Guilly d'Herbemont (1888–1980), white cane for blind people
- Princess Stéphanie of Belgium (1864–1945), chafing dish
- Christine Van Broeckhoven (1953), treatments for neurodegenerative diseases
- Maria Clementine Martin (1775–1843), alcoholic herb extract

== Brazil ==
- Chu Ming Silveira (1941–1997), public telephone

== Canada ==
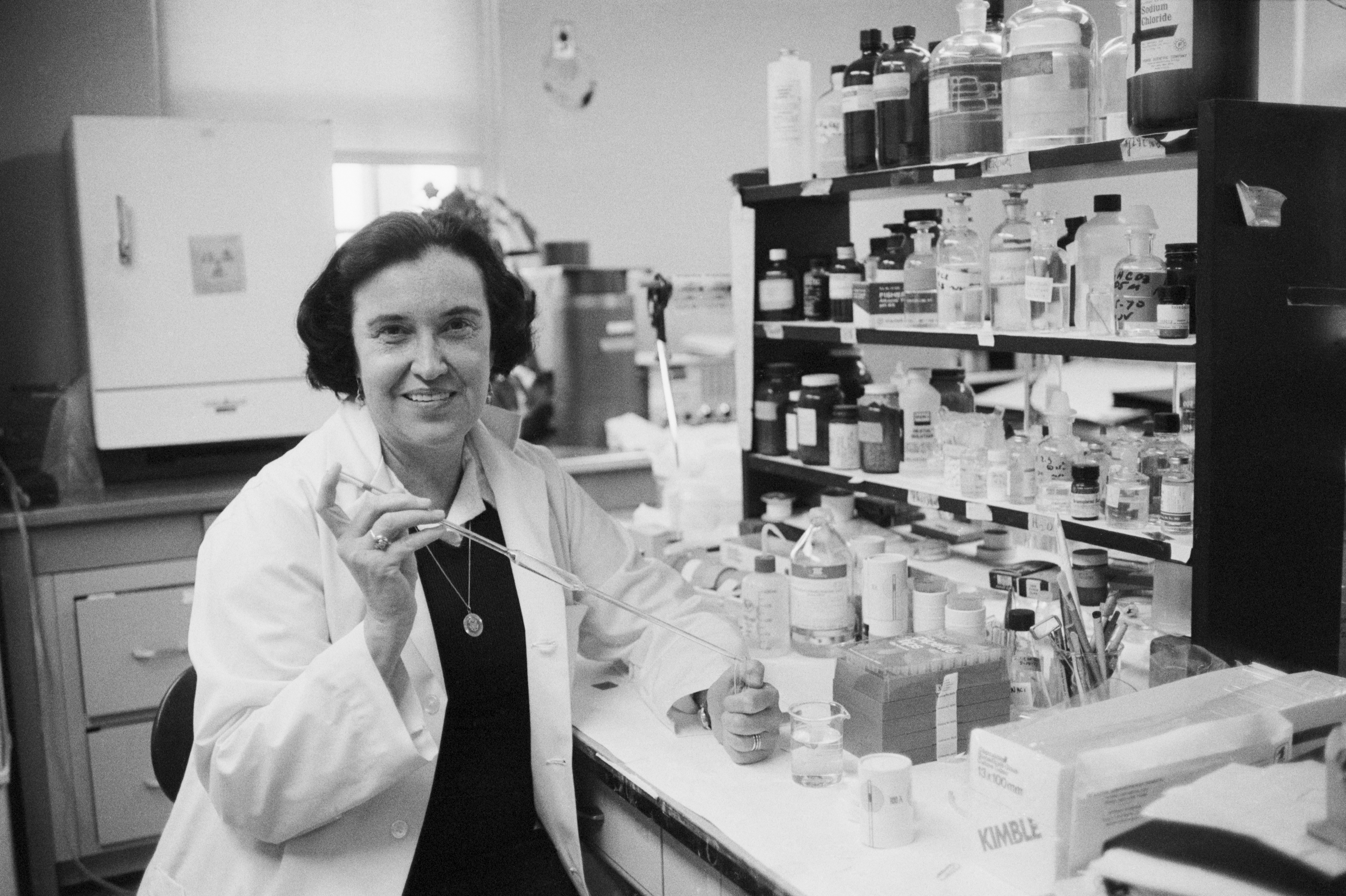
Rosalyn Yalow, Canada, medical IT applications

- Suhayya Abu-Hakima (fl 1982), artificial intelligence
- Margaret Atwood (born 1939), robotic writing with the LongPen
- Yvonne Brill (1924–2013), propulsion technologies
- Martha Matilda Harper (1857–1950), hair tonic
- Catherine McCammon (fl 2000s), spectroscopy-based examination of earth materials
- Rachel Zimmerman (born 1972), Blissymbol printer

== China ==
- Joyce Chen (1917–1994), woks
- Lanying Lin (1918–2003), material engineering
- Tu Youyou (born 1930), malaria treatment
- Rosalyn Sussman Yalow (born 1965), brain-science-based learning tools
- Dan D. Yang (born 1965), learning systems

== Costa Rica ==
- Iris Flores (born 1921-2016), awarded U.S. patents for brasserie and fashion innovations.

== Denmark ==
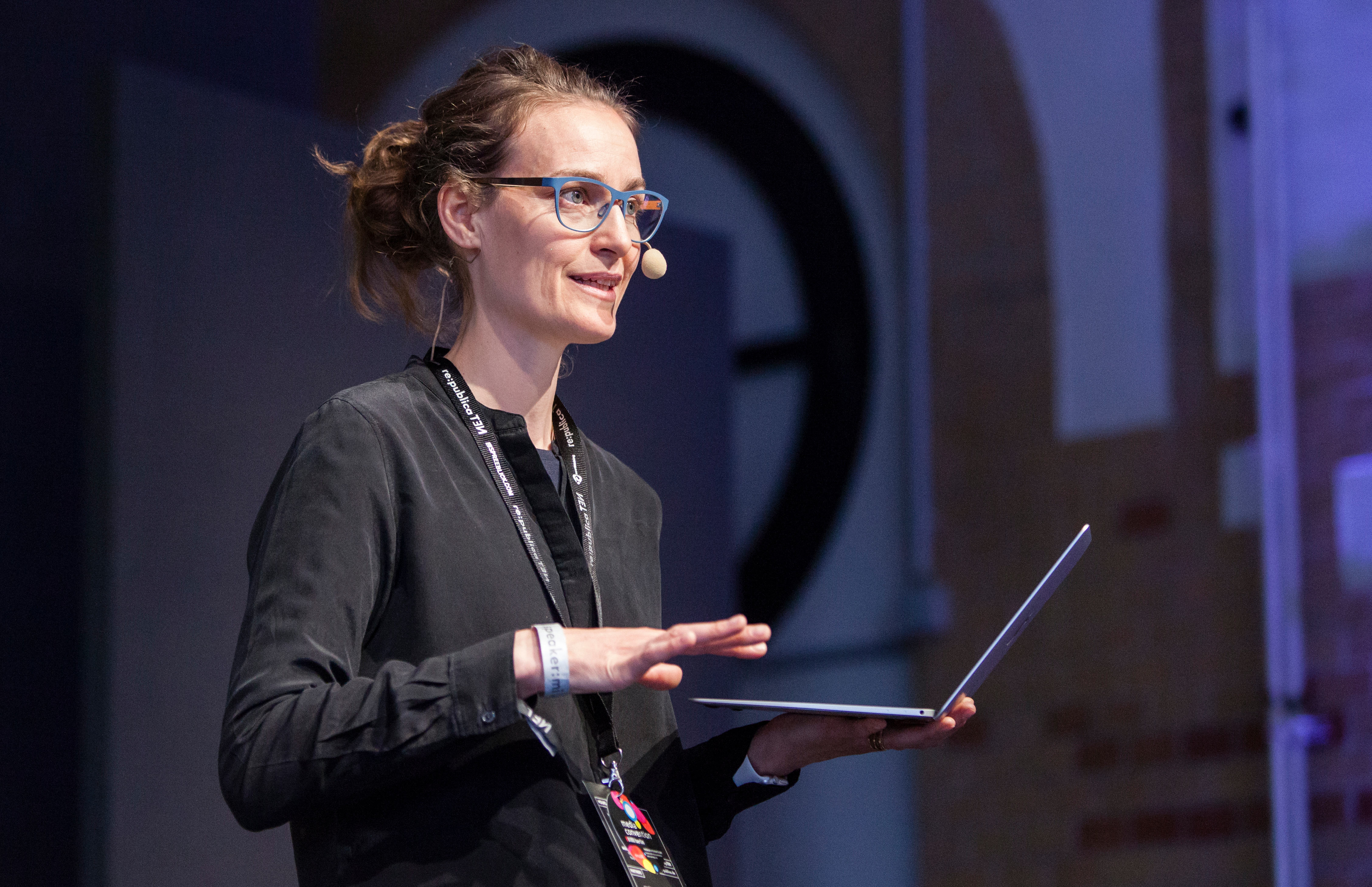
Ida Tin, Denmark, menstruation app

- Dorthe Dahl-Jensen (born 1958), ice cores
- Hanne Nielsen (1829–1903), Havarti cheese
- Ida Tin (born 1979), menstruation app

== Egypt ==
- Hypatia (c.350–415), mathematics, astronomy
- Pandrosion (c.300–360), mathematics

== Finland ==
- Mimmi Bähr (1844–1923), calligrapher and inventor

== France ==
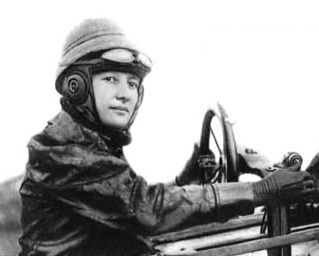
Marie Marvingt, France, airplane skis

- Danièle Aron-Rosa (born 1935), laser-based eye surgery
- Martine Bertereau (born c.1600), mineralogy
- Marie Boivin (1773–1841), pelvimeter, vaginal speculum
- Herminie Cadolle (1845–1926), brassiere
- Madame Clicquot Ponsardin (1777–1866), Champagne riddling
- Marie Harel (1761–1844), Camembert cheese
- Martine Kempf (born 1951), voice activation system
- Géraldine Le Meur (born 1972), digital innovation
- Marie Marvingt (1875–1963), metal plane skis
- Marguerite Perey (1909–1975), francium
- Joanna Truffaut (fl from 2000), urban Wi-Fi networks
- Jeanne Villepreux-Power (1794–1871), aquaria

== Germany ==
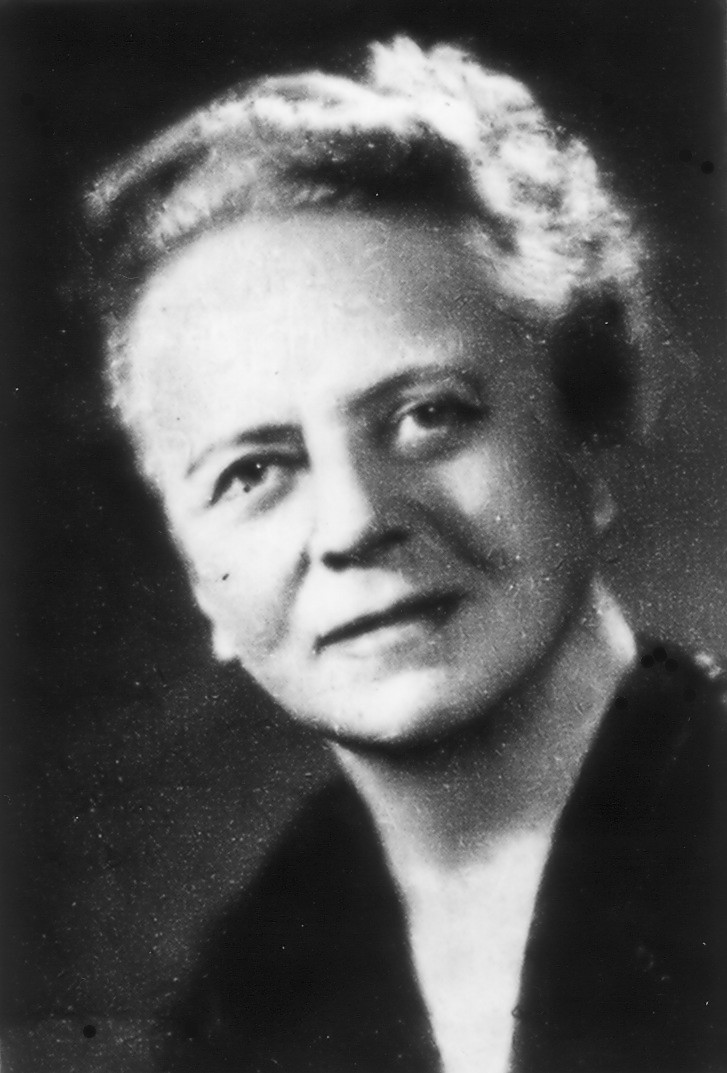
Ida Noddack, Germany, nuclear fission

- Melitta Bentz (1873–1950), coffee filter
- Bertha Benz (1849–1944), brake linings
- Caroline Eichler (1808/9–1843), leg prosthesis, hand prosthesis
- Judith Esser-Mittag (born 1921), applicator-free tampon
- Marga Faulstich (1915–1998), optical glass
- Amelia Freund (1824–1887), cooking stove
- Caroline Herschel (1750-1848), astronomer
- Sonja de Lennart (born 1920), Capri pants
- Maria Goeppert Mayer (1906-1972), nuclear physics
- Ida Noddack (1896–1978), nuclear fission
- Emmy Noether (1882–1935), algebra, physics
- Christiane Nüsslein-Volhard (born 1942), biochemist
- Katharina Paulus (1868-1935), collapsible parachute
- Agnes Pockels (1862-1935), surface science
- Margarete Steiff (1847–1909), stuffed animals
- Brigitte Voit (born 1963), polymers

== Greece ==
- Spéranza Calo-Séailles (1885–1949), "Lap" decorative concrete

== Hungary ==
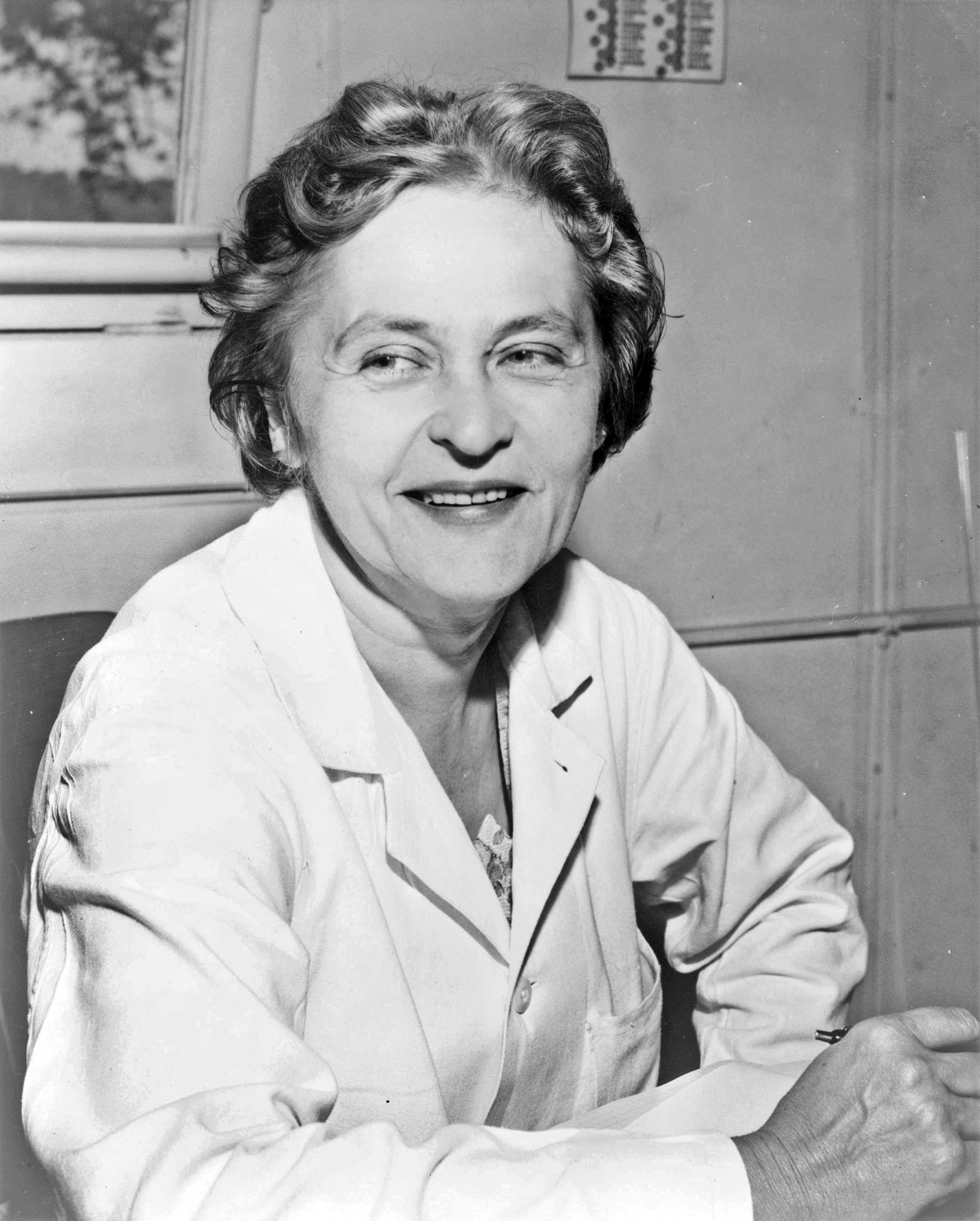
Maria Telkes, Hungary, solar energy

- Mária Telkes (1900–1995), solar energy

== India ==
- Pratibha Gai (fl from 1974), electron microscopy
- Munia Ganguli (fl 2010s), drug delivery systems
- Sylvia Ratnasamy (born 1976), distributed hash table
- Sheila Sri Prakash (born 1955), prefabricated rotationally moulded inspection chamber

== Ireland ==
- Jane Ní Dhulchaointigh (fl 2010s), silicone glue

== Israel ==
- Ruth Arnon (born 1933), multiple sclerosis drug

== Italy ==
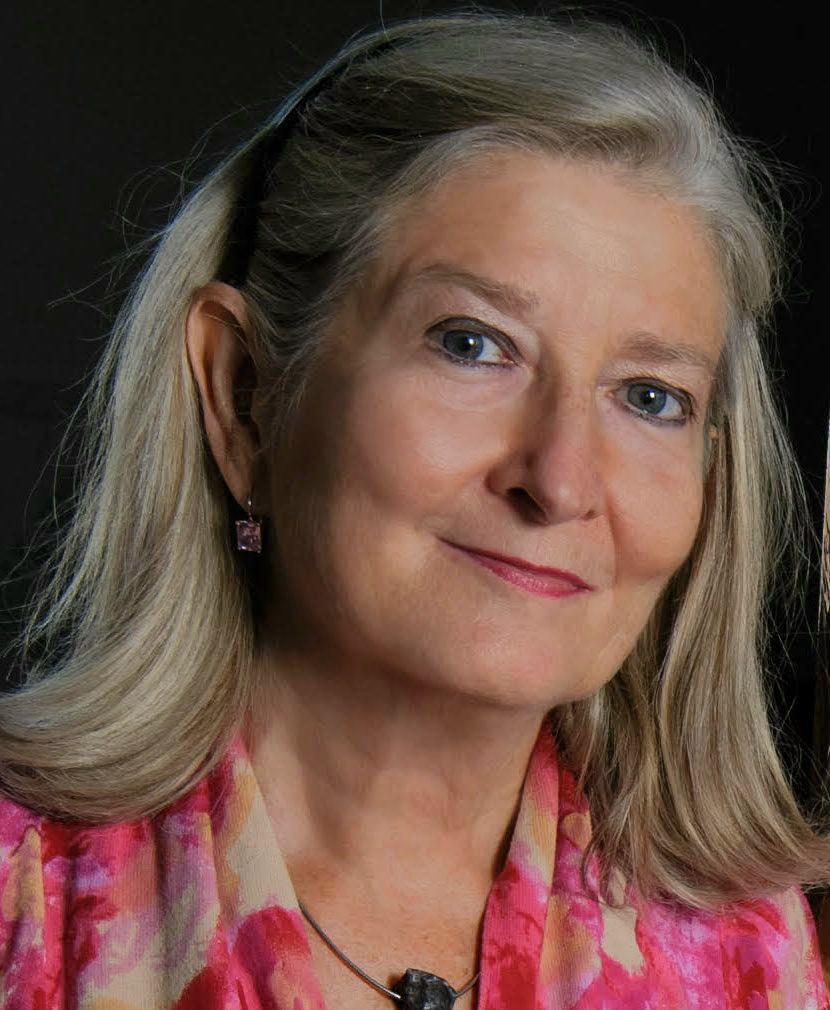
Patrizia Caraveo, Italy, particle physics

- Maria Abbracchio (born 1956), pharmacology
- Catia Bastioli (born 1957), biodegradable plastics
- Patrizia Caraveo (born 1954), particle physics
- Teresa Ciceri Castiglioni (1750–1821) Italian inventor, agronomist
- Maria Cristina Facchini (fl from 1980s), aerosols
- Elena of Montenegro (1873–1952), signed photographs
- Maria Montessori (1870–1952), physician and educator
- Adele Racheli (1897–1992) engineer and co-founder of Milan patent protection office

== Japan ==
- Teruko Mizushima (1920–1996), time-based currency
- Katsuko Saruhashi (1920–2007), measurement of carbon-dioxide concentrations in seawater

== Latvia ==
- Marija Šimanska (1922–1995), heterocyclic compounds
- Lina Stern (1878–1968), blood–brain barrier

== Netherlands ==
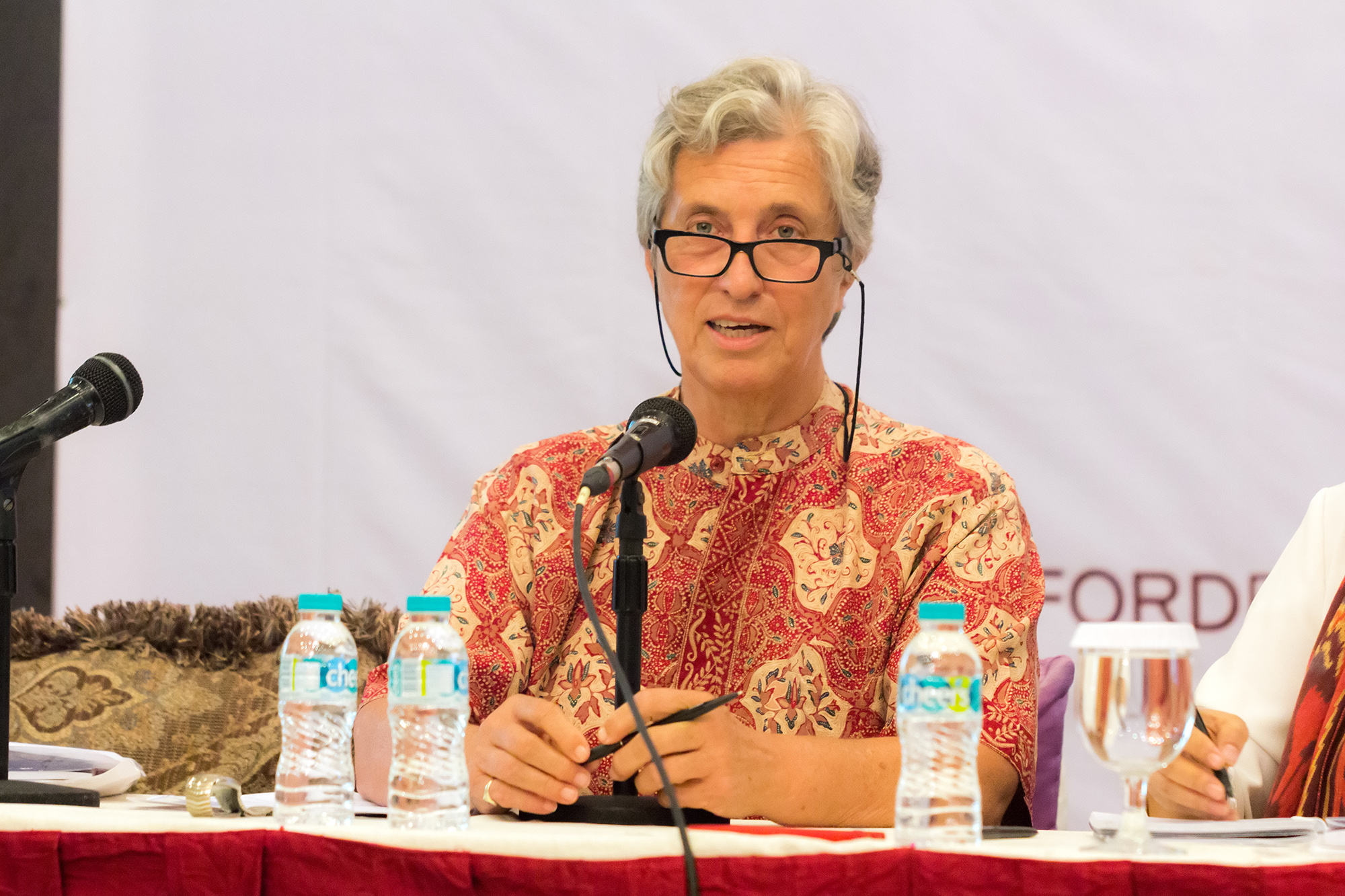
Saskia Wieringa, Netherlands, gender relations

- Katja Loos (born 1971), enzymatic polymerization
- Laura J. van 't Veer (born 1957), cancer risk screening
- Saskia Wieringa (born 1950), gender relations

== New Zealand ==
- Elizabeth Ann Louisa Mackay (1843–1908), cooking utensils

== Nigeria ==
- Omowunmi Sadik (born 1964), microelectrode sensing, environmental applications

== Poland ==
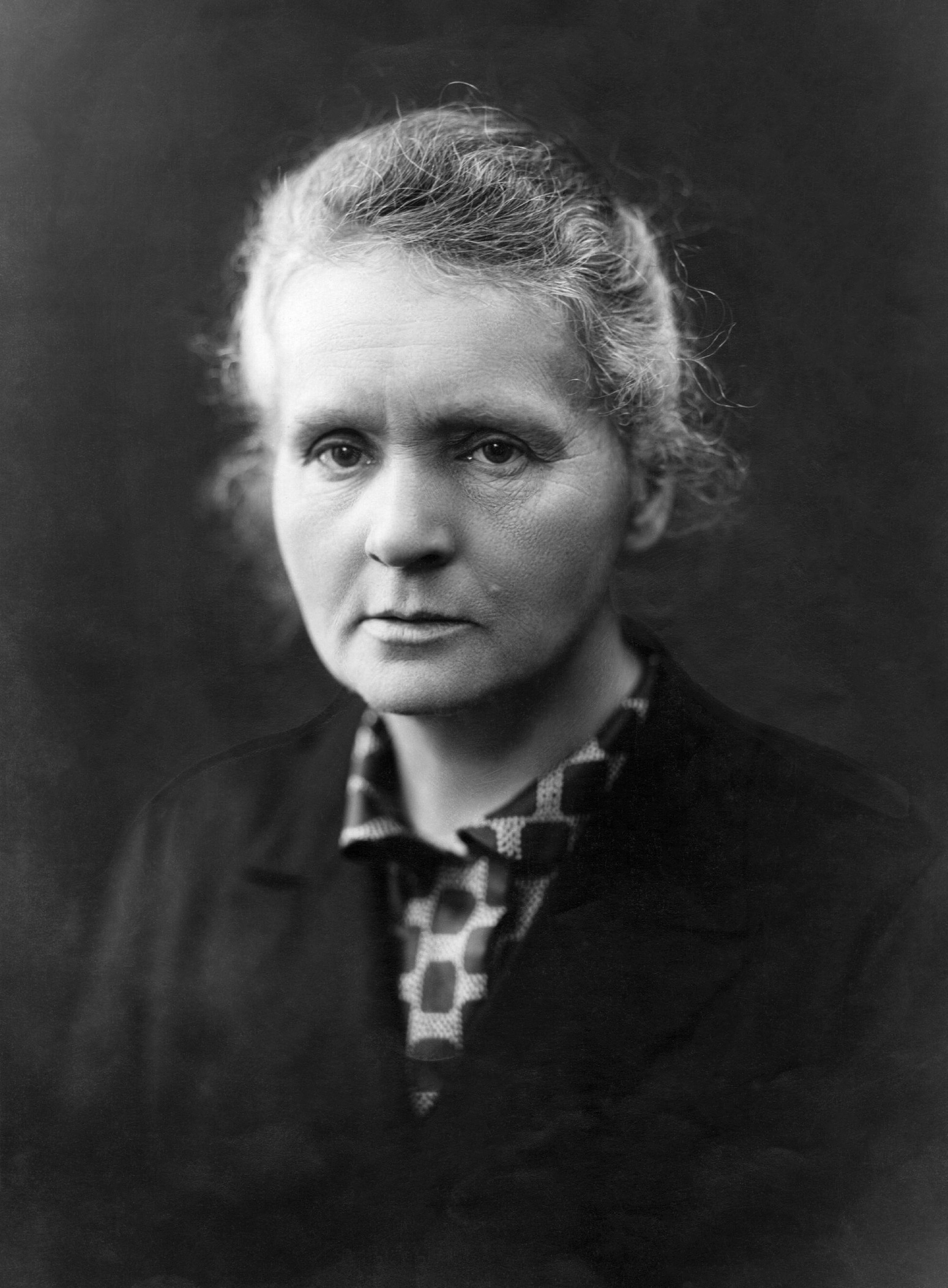
- Marie Curie, radioactivity
  Marie Curie (1867–1934), radioactivity

== Portugal ==
- Antonia Ferreira (1811–1896), winemaking

== Romania ==
- Ana Aslan (1897–1988), ageing treatment

== Russia ==
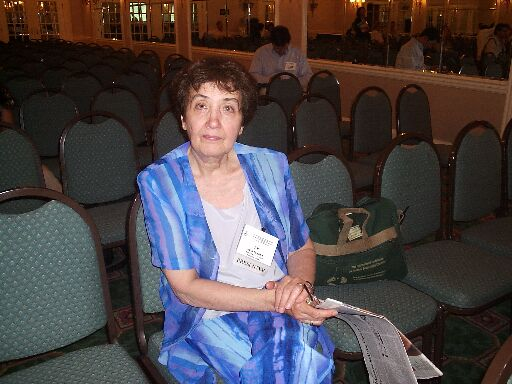
Beletskaya, Russia, organometallic chemistry

- Anna Pavlova (1881–1931), pointe shoes for ballet
- Irina Beletskaya (born 1933), organometallic chemistry

== Singapore ==
- Lin Hsin Hsin (fl 1990s), various IT inventions

== Spain ==
- Concepción Aleixandre (1862–1952), gynecology
- Ángela Ruiz Robles (1895–1975), electronic book reader
- Margarita Salas (1938–2019), DNA amplification

== Sweden ==
- Maria Christina Bruhn (1732–1808), gunpowder packaging
- Eva Ekeblad (1724–1786), agronomy
- Amalia Eriksson (1824–1923), candy stick
- Simone Giertz (born 1990), robotic devices
- Iréne Grahn (1945–2013), patented finger joint support for patients with rheumatoid arthritis
- Hanna Hammarström (1829–1909), telephone wires
- Ninni Kronberg (1874–1946), powdered milk
- Laila Ohlgren (1937–2014), mobile telephony
- Maria Romell (1859-1949), heat-insulated food container and more
- Petra Wadström (b.1952), inventor of Solvatten

== Switzerland ==
- Ursula Keller (born 1959), laser technology

== United Arab Emirates ==
- Reem Al Marzouqi (fl 2000s), car driven without hands

== United Kingdom ==
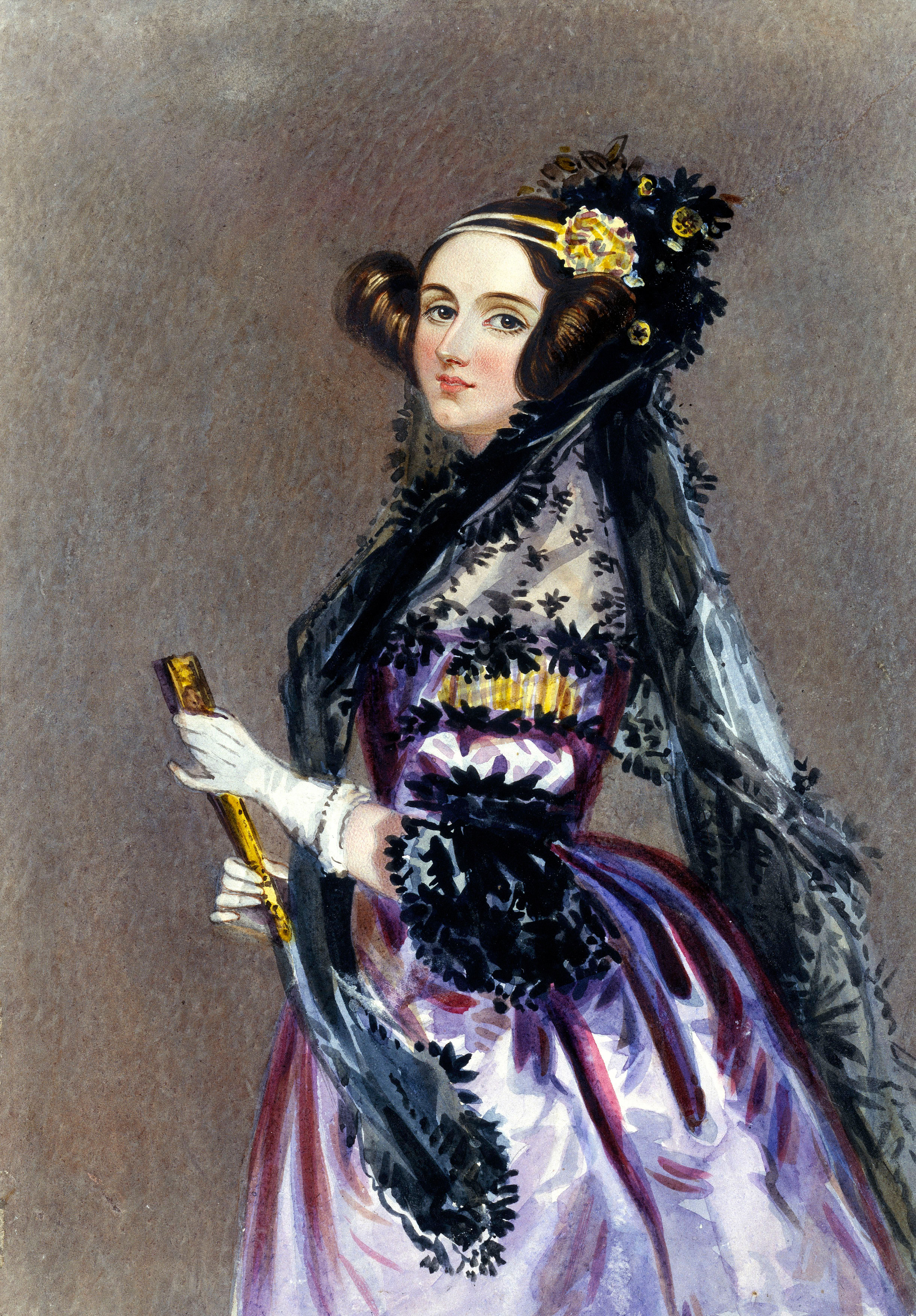
Portrait of Ada Lovelace, mathematician, possibly by Alfred Edward Chalon

- Princess Anne of Löwenstein-Wertheim-Freudenberg (1864–1927), automatic balancing bed
- Anna Atkins (1799–1871), photography
- Hertha Ayrton (1854–1923), electric arc lighting
- Theresa Berkley (died 1836), Berkley Horse
- Lauren Bowker (born 1985), colour-change inks
- Roxey Ann Caplin (1793–1888), corsetry
- Adelaide Claxton (fl 1860s–1890s), ear caps
- Eleanor Coade (1733–1821), artificial stoneware
- Emily Cummins (born 1987), evaporative refrigeration
- Fiona Fairhurst (fl 2009), swimsuits
- Christine Foyer (born 1952), plant science
- Rosalind Franklin (1920-1958), chemist
- Ida Freund (1863–1914), gas measurement
- Barbara Gilmour (died 1732), cheese making
- Sarah Guppy (1770–1852), bridge construction, domestic devices
- Mandy Haberman (born 1956), baby bottles
- Diane Hart (1926–2002), corsetry
- Valerie Hunter Gordon (1921–2016), disposable diapers, sanitary towels
- Phyllis Margaret Tookey Kerridge (1901–1940), glass electrodes
- Marie Killick (1914–1964), sapphire stylus
- Helen Lee (researcher) (fl from 1990s), diagnostic kits for infectious disease
- Ada Lovelace (1815-1852), mathematician
- Heather Martin (designer) (fl from 2000), interaction design
- Jane A. McKeating (fl from 1990s), molecular biology
- Emma Parmee (fl from 1990s), antidiabetic drugs
- Lucy Rogers (fl from 1990s), animatronic controllers
- Leslie Scott (born 1955), board games
- Beatrice Shilling (1909–1990), device for aircraft engines
- Bridget Elizabeth Talbot (1885–1971), watertight electric torch
- Asha Peta Thompson (fl 2000s), wearable technology

== United States ==
A

- Berenice Abbott (1898–1991), photography
- Alice Alldredge (born 1949), marine biology
- Frances Allen (1932–2020), computer scientist
- Randi Altschul (born 1960), cellphones, games and toys
- Susan Amara (fl from 2000), drug discovery
- Anne Anastasi (1908–2001), psychometrics
- Betsy Ancker-Johnson (born 1927), plasma physics
- Beth Anderson (born 1950), music composition
- Laurie Anderson (born 1947), electronic music
- Mary Anderson, windscreen wipers
- Virginia Apgar (1909–1974), health of newborns
- Frances Arnold (born 1956), enzyme engineering
- Barbara Askins (born 1939), photographic negative enhancement

B

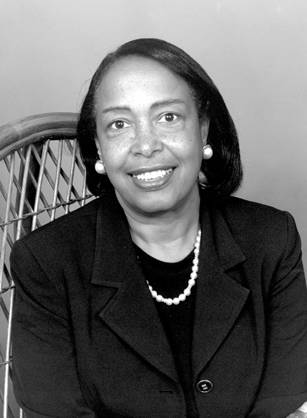
Patricia Bath, USA, medical devices

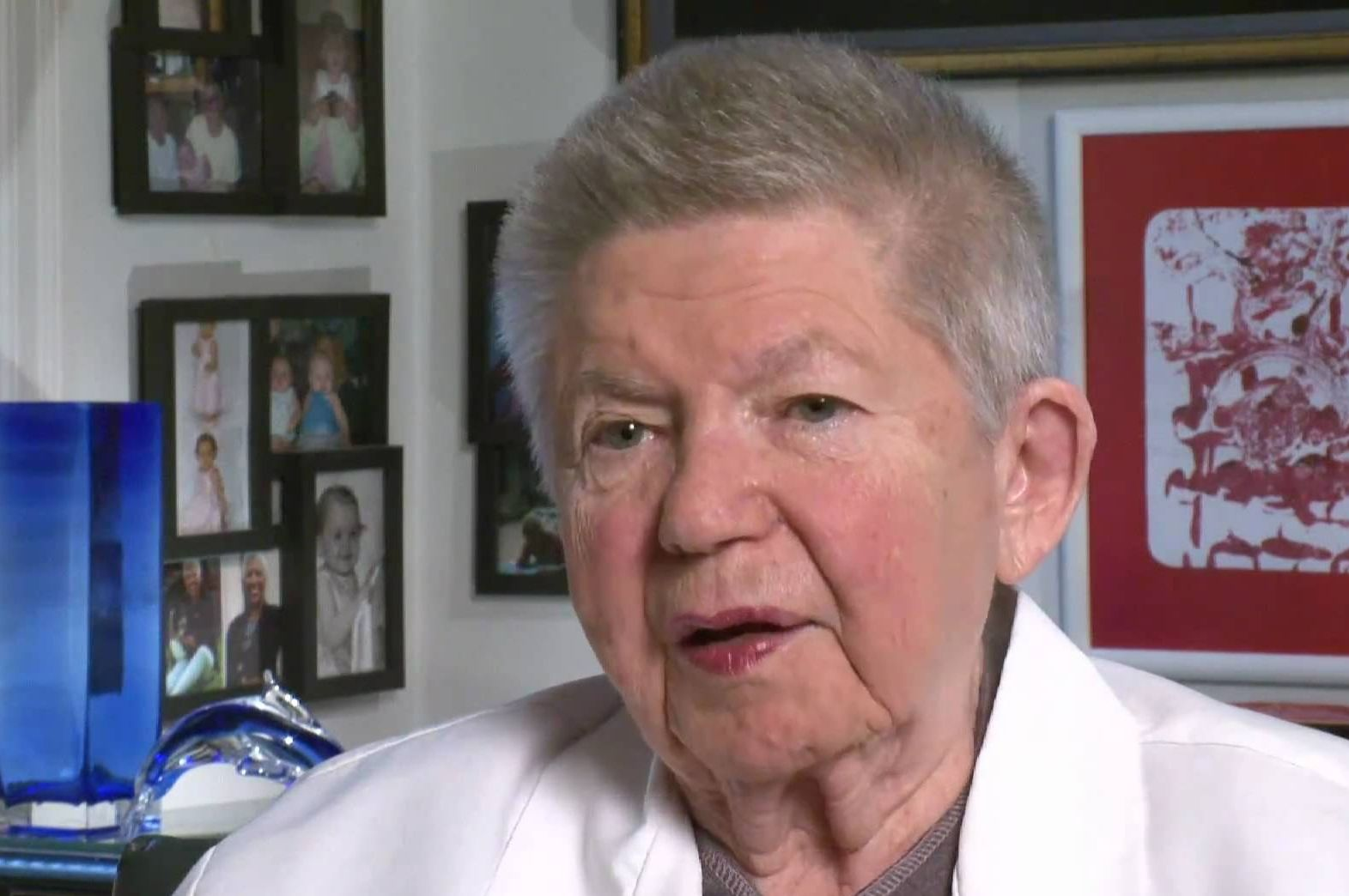
Patricia Billings, USA, building materials

- Tabitha Babbitt (1779–c. 1853), tool making
- Betty Lou Bailey (1929–2007), exhaust nozzle
- Ellene Alice Bailey (1853–1897), clothing, household goods
- Betsey Metcalf Baker (1786–1867), straw bonnets
- Anna Baldwin (fl 1860s), milk production
- Alice Pike Barney (1857–1931), mechanical devices
- Janet Emerson Bashen (born 1957), software
- Patricia Bath (born 1942), medical devices
- Maria Beasley (fl 1870s–1890s), barrel hooper, life rafts
- Ruth Benedict (1887–1948), anthropology
- Ruth R. Benerito (1916–2013), cotton fabrics
- Miriam Benjamin (1861–1947), hotel chairs
- Evelyn Berezin (1925–2018), computerized typewriter
- Margaret Olofsson Bergman (1872–1948), looms
- Barbara Beskind (fl 1945–1956), therapeutic devices
- Patricia Billings (born 1926), Geobond building material
- Hazel Bishop (1906–1998), lipstick
- Sara Blakely (born 1971), hosiery
- Helen Blanchard (1840–1922), sewing machines
- Joani Blank (1937–2016), vibrators
- Katharine Burr Blodgett (1898–1979), low-reflectance glass
- Bessie Blount Griffin (1914–2009), feeding devices, disposable basins
- Vanna Bonta (1958–2014), flight suit for weightless environments
- Sarah Boone (1832–1904), ironing boards
- Shree Bose (born 1994), drugs for treating cancer
- Charlotte Bridgwood (1861–1929), windshield wipers
- Louise Brigham (1875–1956), modular furniture design
- Clarissa Britain (1816–1895), received seven patents
- Marie Van Brittan Brown (1922–1999), home security systems
- Deborah Washington Brown (1952–2020), speech recognition
- Rachel Fuller Brown (1898–1980), antibiotics
- Mary Brush (fl 1815), corsets

C

- Ve Elizabeth Cadie, (20th century), heat insulating handle for small home appliances, coffee pot
- Mary P. Carpenter (1840–1900), sewing machines, mosquito nets
- Keiana Cavé (born 1998), oil spill disperants
- Leona Chalmers (fl 1937), menstrual cup
- Melanie Chartoff (born 1950), water recycling
- Deanna M. Church (fl from 1990s), human genome
- Inga Stephens Pratt Clark (1906–1970), scarf
- Edith Clarke (1883–1959), electrical engineering
- Josephine Cochrane (1839–1913), dishwasher
- Margaret P. Colvin, (1820-1894), laundry improvements including the Triumph Rotary Washer
- Lynn Conway (born 1938), computer science
- Martha Coston (1826–1904), marine signalling
- Cathy A. Cowan (fl from 1990s), health care cost trends
- Margaret Crane (fl 1967), home pregnancy test
- Caresse Crosby (1891–1970), modern bra
- Rose Cumming (1887–1968), wallpapers
- Jamie Lee Curtis (born 1958), diapers

D

- Emily Davenport (1810–1862), electric motor
- Constance Demby (1939–2021), electronic musical instruments
- Olive Dennis (1885–1957), passenger train equipment
- Maude Dickinson (c.1866–1933), hygiene products
- Marion Donovan (1917–1998), disposable diapers
- Anna Dormitzer (1830–1903), window-cleaning equipment
- Emily C. Duncan (born 1849), banking calculators

E

- Tomima Edmark (born 1957), garments designed for online sales
- Ellen Eglin (born 1849), clothes wringer
- Gertrude B. Elion (1918–1999), medical research, drugs
- Jeri Ellsworth (born 1974), computer design

F

- Ethel Finck (1932–2003), cardiac catheter
- Edith M. Flanigen (born 1929), molecular sieves
- Irmgard Flügge-Lotz (1903–1974), aircraft guidance systems
- Eunice Newton Foote (1819–1888), greenhouse effect, boot soles
- Josephine G. Fountain (fl 1960), direct suction tracheotomy tube
- Helen Murray Free (1923–2021), diabetes tests

G

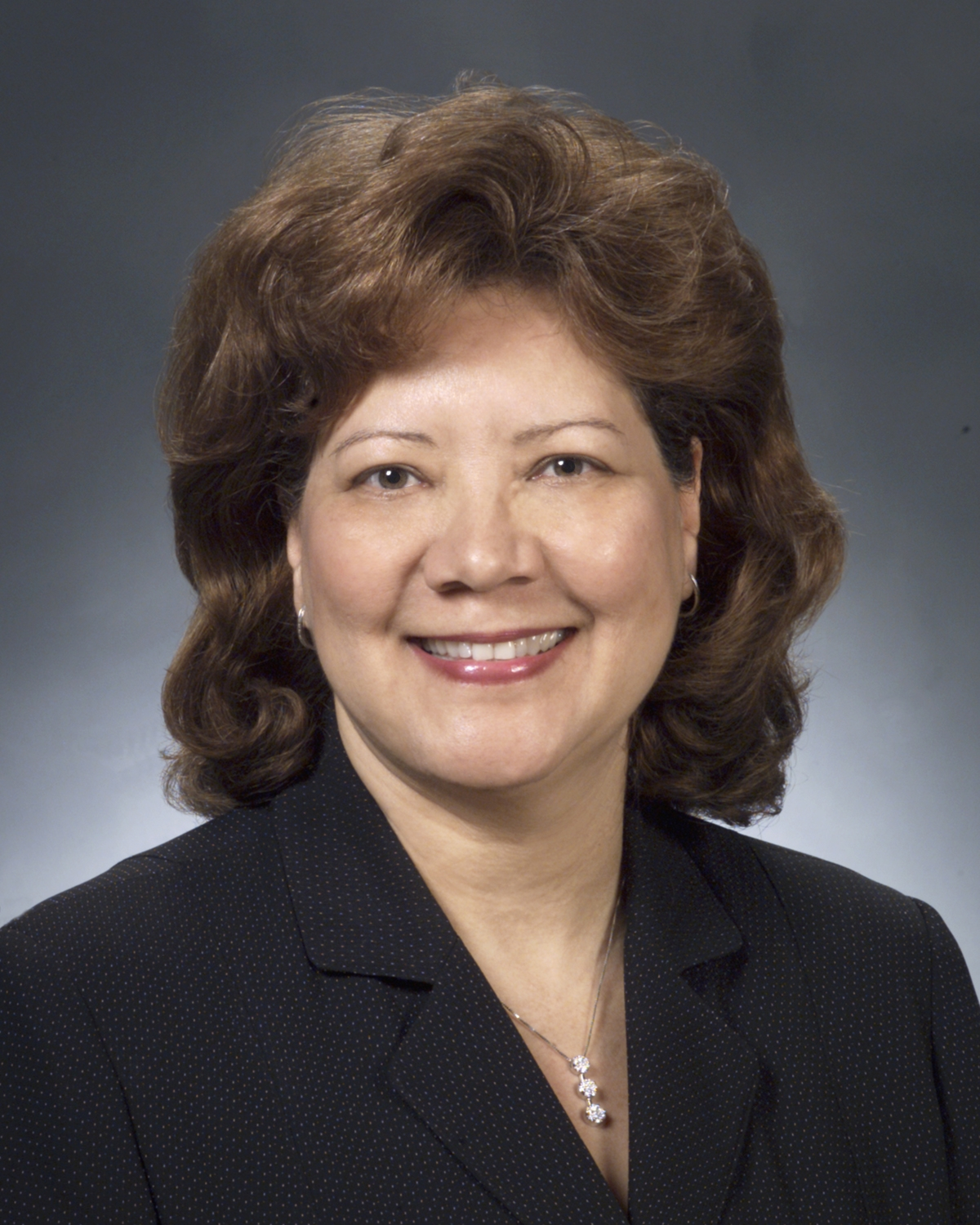
Olga D. González-Sanabria

- Frances Gabe (1915–2016), self-cleaning house
- Ruth Graves Wakefield (1903–1977), chocolate chip cookies
- Sarah E. Goode (1855–1905), folding cabinet bed
- Linda Gottfredson (born 1947), educational psychology
- Olga D. González-Sanabria (fl from 1979), battery technology, systems management
- Bette Nesmith Graham (1924–1980), liquid paper
- Temple Grandin (born 1947), hug machine
- Elizabeth Riddle Graves (1916–1972), Manhattan Project
- Lori Greiner (born 1969), household sponge, toilet accessories

H

- Mary Hallock-Greenewalt (1871–1950), visual music
- Ruth Handler (1916–2002), Barbie doll
- Elise Harmon (1909–1985), computer miniaturization
- Martha Matilda Harper (1857–1950), retail franchising
- Arlene Harris (born 1948), mobile and wireless technologies
- Ami Harten (1946–1994), applied mathematics
- Elizabeth Lee Hazen (1885–1975), antifungal medication
- Marti Hearst (fl from 1990s), text mining
- Ada Henry Van Pelt (1838–1923), water purification
- Beulah Louise Henry (1887–1973), sewing machines, freezers, typewriters
- Isabella Coler Herb (c.1863–1943), ether administration to patients
- Leta Stetter Hollingworth (1886–1939), educational psychology
- Mabel White Holmes (1890–1977), baking mixes
- Erna Schneider Hoover (born 1926), computerized telephone switching
- Grace Hopper (1906–1992), computer programming language compiler
- Frances Hugle (1927–1968), semiconductors
- Simona Hunyadi Murph (fl 2010s), nano technologies
- Ida Henrietta Hyde (1857–1945), intracellular micropipette electrode

J

- Mary Lou Jepsen (born 1965), computer applications, sunlight-readable display, laptop development
- Karen C. Johnson (born 1955), preventative health
- Kristina M. Johnson (born 1957), optoelectronic processing, 3-D imaging
- Nancy Maria Donaldson Johnson (1794–1890), hand-operated ice cream freezer
- Amanda Jones (1935–1914), vacuum canning
- Eldorado Jones (1860–1932), aeronautical mufflers, electric iron developments
- Marjorie Joyner (1896–1994), cosmetics, permanent waving

K

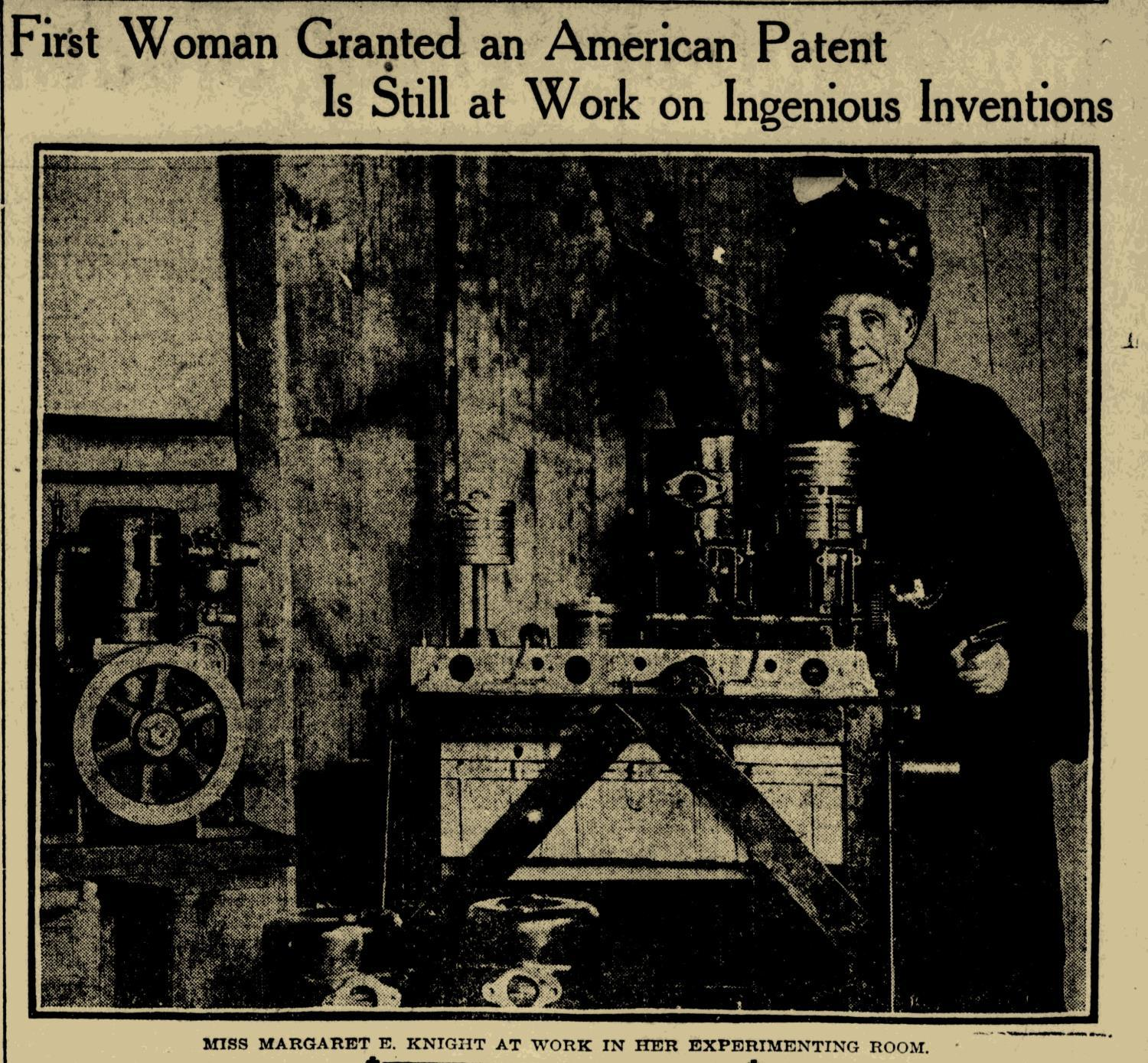
Margaret Knight with one of her many inventions

- Anna Keichline (1899–1943), interior design, kitchen features, construction bricks
- Mary Kenner (1912–2006), sanitary belt
- Mary Dixon Kies (1752–1837), hat manufacture
- Elizabeth Kingsley (1871–1957), crossword puzzles
- Edith Klemperer (1898–1987), neurology and psychiatry
- Margaret E. Knight (1838–1914), flat-bottomed paper bag
- June Kroenke (fl 1960s–1990s), sewing tools
- Deepika Kurup (born 1998), solar-powered water purification
- Stephanie Kwolek (1923–2014), synthetic fibres
- Angela Kornas (born 1977), bra inserts

L

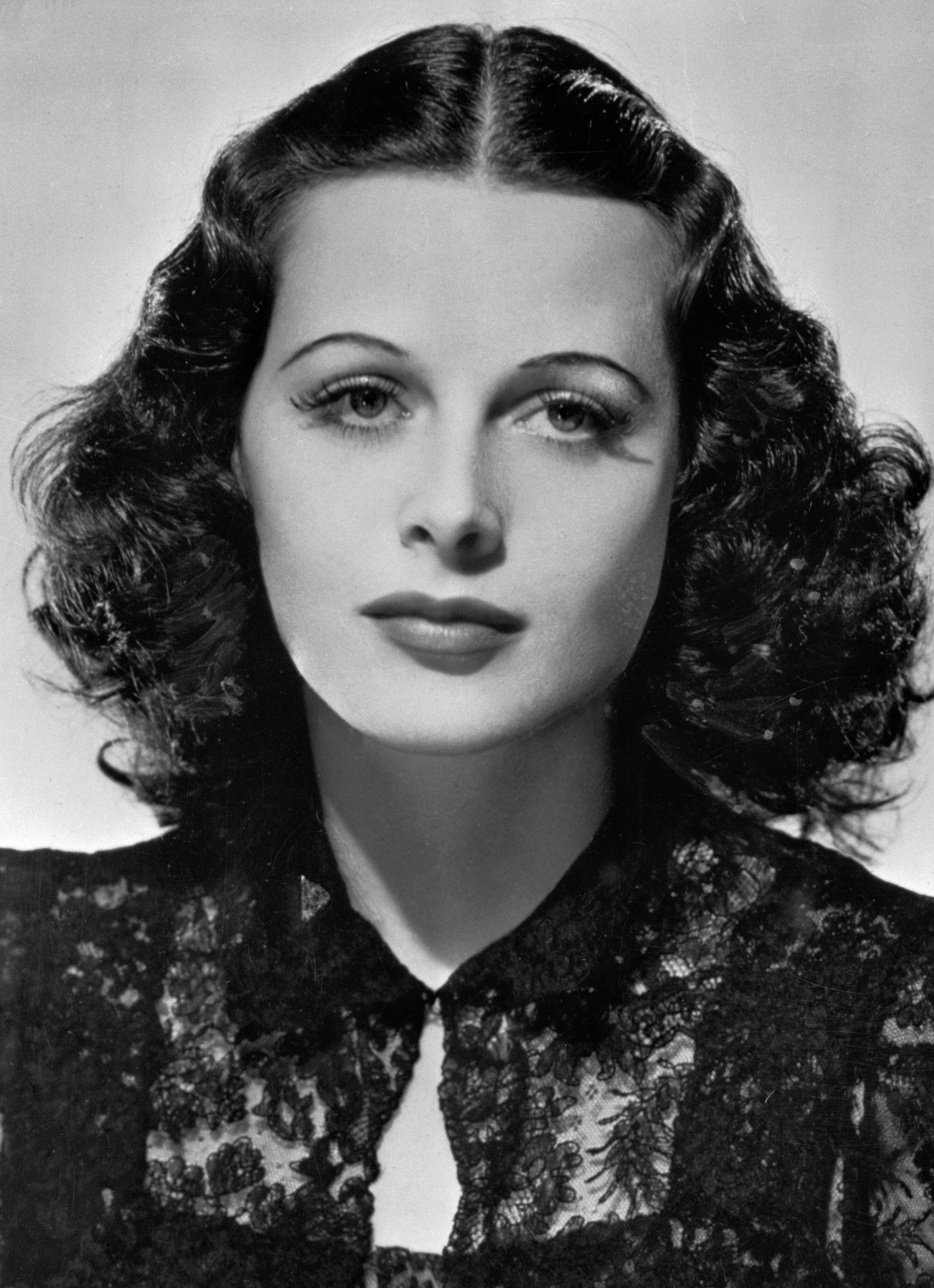
Hedy Lamarr, Inventor, 1939

- Hedy Lamarr (1914–2000), radio guidance systems
- Esther Lederberg (1922–2006), microbial genetics
- Cricket Lee (born 1953), clothing fitting
- Tara Lemmey (fl 2010s), information technology
- Jennifer A. Lewis (born 1964), 3D printing
- Lisa Lindahl (born 1948), exercise bra
- Barbara Liskov (born 1939), computer programming

M

- Elizabeth Magie (1866–1948), game of Monopoly
- Misha Mahowald (1963–1996), computational systems
- Annie Malone (1869–1957), cosmetics
- Helen Herrick Malsed (1910–1998), toys
- Joy Mangano (born 1956), self-wringing mop, luggage systems
- Elizabeth Holloway Marston (1893–1993), systolic blood-pressure test
- Sybilla Righton Masters (1676–1720), corn milling, hat making
- Jessica O. Matthews (fl from 2008), energy-storing devices
- Melanie Mayron (born 1952), skin care products
- Frances McConnell-Mills (1900–1975), hair rinse
- Florence Melton (1911–2007), foam-soled slippers
- Barbara Haviland Minor (fl from 1980s), refrigerants
- Heidi Messer (born 1969), online marketing
- Ynes Mexia (1870–1938), botany
- Catharine Cox Miles (1890–1984), human intelligence
- Joan L. Mitchell (1947–2015), JPEG image format
- Sumita Mitra (born 1949), dental filler based on nanoparticles
- Karen Mohlke (fl from 1990s), human genetics
- Mary Sherman Morgan (1921–2004), hydyne rocket fuel
- Virginia A. Myers (1927–2015), printing press developments

N

- Klára Dán von Neumann (1911–1963), early computer applications, including meteorology
- Lyda D. Newman (fl 1890s), hairbrush

P

- Karen Panetta (fl 1990s), medical diagnostics software
- Alice H. Parker (1885–1920), gas-powered central-heating furnace
- Bonnie Pemberton (fl from 1990s), cat anti-scratch deterrent
- Radia Perlman (born 1951), spanning-tree networking protocol
- Lindsay Phillips (born 1984), flip-flop design
- Mary Florence Potts (1850–1922), clothes irons

Q

- Agnes J. Quirk (1884–1974), penicillin production

R

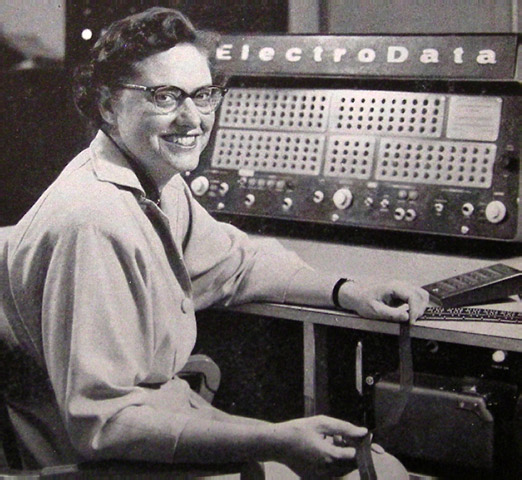
Sybil Rock

- Gitanjali Rao (born 2005), measurement of lead content in water
- Sibyl M. Rock (1909–1981), mass spectrometry
- Ernestine Rose (1810–1892), deodorizer
- Lorraine Rothman (1932–2007), menstrual extraction kit

S

- Leona D. Samson (born 1952), DNA repair
- Ginny Scales-Medeiros (fl 1970s), tanning system
- Sandra Scarr (born 1936), developmental psychology
- Becky Schroeder (born 1962), Glow Sheet for writing in the dark
- Patsy O'Connell Sherman (1930–2008), Scotchgard, repellents
- Altina Schinasi (1907–1999), Harlequin eyeglass frame
- Amy B. Smith (born 1962), screenless hammer mill, phase-change incubator
- Pamela S. Soltis (born 1957), botany, polyploidy
- Fannie S. Spitz (1873–1943), nut-shelling equipment
- Vesta Stoudt (1891–1966), duct tape
- Edith Stern (born 1952), holds over 100 patents in various computerized applications
- Harriet Williams Russell Strong (1844–1926), water storage
- Janese Swanson (born 1958), educational games

T

- Esther Takeuchi (born 1953), energy storage
- Emily E. Tassey (1823–1899), marine technology
- Emily E. Tassey (fl 1980s), women's bicycles
- Valerie Thomas (born 1943), illusion transmitter
- Elizabeth Sthreshley Townsend (died 1919), braille typewriter
- Harriet Tracy (1834–1918), elevators and sewing machines
- Ann Tsukamoto (born 1952), stem cell research
- Madeline Turner (fl 1916), fruit press
- Anne Tyng (1920–2011), children's construction set

V

- Gordana Vunjak-Novakovic (fl 1990s), tissue grafts

W

- Grace Wahba (born 1934), statistics
- Mary Walton (fl 1879), reduced hazards of smoke emissions
- Josephine Webb (1918–2017), switchgear
- Sandra Welner (1858–2001), patient examination table
- Eliza Wilbur (1851–1930), telescopes
- Margaret A. Wilcox (born 1838), car heater design
- Nancy Farley Wood (1903–2003), ionizing radiation detectors

Y

- Rosalyn Sussman Yalow (1921–2011), radioimmunoassay technique
- Adele De Berri (1885 - 1950s), Inventor of Silver Screen

== See also ==
- List of inventions and discoveries by women
