= Hothousing =

Form of education for children

Hothousing is a form of education for children, involving intense study of a topic in order to stimulate the child's mind. The goal is to take normal or bright children and boost them to a level of intellectual functioning above the norm. Advocates of the practice claim that it is essential for the brightest to flourish intellectually, while critics claim that it does more harm than good and can lead a child to abandon the area studied under such a scheme later in life.

== Development ==
It was Irving Sigel who first introduced the term "hothousing" in 1987 after the greenhouse farming method, defining it as "the process of inducing infants to acquire knowledge that is typically acquired at a later developmental level." It was an analogy with the way vegetables are forced to ripen in this condition. Sigel, who worked for the Educational Testing Service in Princeton, used it to refer to a child who is drilled in academic fields such as reading and math long before other children begin learning them in school. The child is likened to a "hurried student" induced to acquire knowledge with emphasis on how it fits into a broader scheme of knowledge instead of acquiring bits of information.

In 1985, a symposium titled "The Hot Housing of Young Children; So Much, So Soon" was held in Philadelphia. Most presenters at the symposium were critical of hothousing, with one presenter, Brian Sutton-Smith, remarking "If you get hothoused, you end up being a rotten tomato—or at least a pallid tomato". In 1987, a Channel 4 documentary series Hot House People was seen by millions of viewers, telling them that every child should be "programmed for genius" and has a potential intelligence greater than that of Leonardo da Vinci.

Some scholars have criticized hothousing, labeling it as early maturity of learning.

== Famous people who underwent hothousing ==
- Charles S. Peirce
- Gordon Brown
- John Stuart Mill
- Aubrey de Grey
- Val McDermid
- Edith Stern
- Ruth Lawrence
