= Charles Beatty =

Charles Beatty may refer to:

- Charles Clinton Beatty (1800–1882), Presbyterian minister, seminary founder, and academic philanthropist
- Charles Eugene Beatty (1909–1998), American track and field athlete and educator

== See also ==
- Charles Beattie, Northern Irish farmer and auctioneer
