= McKeating =

McKeating is a surname. Notable people with the surname include:

- Dan McKeating (1910–?), English rugby league player
- Jane A. McKeating (fl. 1982), British scientist
- Vince McKeating (1919–2011), English rugby league player
