= Romell =

Romell is a surname and a given name. Notable people with the name include:

Surname:

- Louis C. Romell (1899–1987), American member of the Wisconsin State Assembly
- Maria Romell (1859–1949), Swedish inventor, founder of Romell's Patent Office in Stockholm

Given name:

- Romell Brathwaite (born 1982), Barbadian international footballer
- Romell Broom (1956–2020), American death row inmate convicted of murder, kidnapping and rape
- Romell Glave (born 1999), British track and field athlete
- Romell Quioto (born 1991), aka El Romántico, Honduran professional footballer
- Romell Regulacion, creator of "Razed in Black", an electronic music act
- Andre Romell Young (born 1965), aka Dr. Dre, American rapper, record producer, record executive, and actor
