= Kroenke =

Kroenke (from German: Krönke) is a surname. Notable people with the surname include:

- Ann Walton Kroenke (born 1948), American billionaire
- Bernard B. Kroenke (1898–1981), American politician from Wisconsin
- Herbert Kronke (born 1950), German scientist
- Josh Kroenke (born 1980), American heir and entrepreneur
- June Kroenke, American inventor
- Stan Kroenke (born 1947), American entrepreneur
- Zach Kroenke (born 1984), American baseball player
