= Amanda McFarland =

American missionary

Amanda Reed McFarland (1832–1912) was an American missionary. She was the first woman missionary to the U.S. state of Alaska.

== Biography ==
McFarland was born in Brooke County, Virginia (present day West Virginia) about 1832. She was educated at Steubenville Female Seminary.

In 1857, she married Rev. David F. McFarland, a Presbyterian clergyman. From 1862 till 1866, her husband held charge of Mattoon female seminary in Illinois, and in 1867 removed to Santa Fe, New Mexico to engage in mission work in that state. Here Mrs. McFarland organized and conducted a successful mission-school among Mexican children. In 1873, they removed to California and established an academy at San Diego, and in 1875 they conducted missions among the Nez Perce people.

After Mr. McFarland's death in 1876, she went under the Presbyterian Church Home Board and removed to Portland, Oregon, and in 1877 took charge of a school at Fort Wrangell, Alaska, where she was joined and assisted by missionary S. Hall Young in August 1878. She acted as clergyman, physician, and lawyer for the local people. Encountering great difficulties and discouragements, she made the beginning of a Christian society in opening schools and organizing churches. She was called to preside over a native constitutional convention, and chiefs came long distances to enter the school of "the woman who loved their people," and to plead that teachers should be sent to their tribes. Her efforts resulted in the establishment of a training-school for Alaskan girls called "The McFarland Home," of which institution she held charge.
