= Steubenville Female Seminary =

Coordinates: 40°21′24″N 80°36′49″W

- Former names: Beatty's Seminary for Young Ladies; Steubenville Seminary
- Type: Female seminary
- Active: 1829–1898
- Location: Steubenville, Ohio, USA

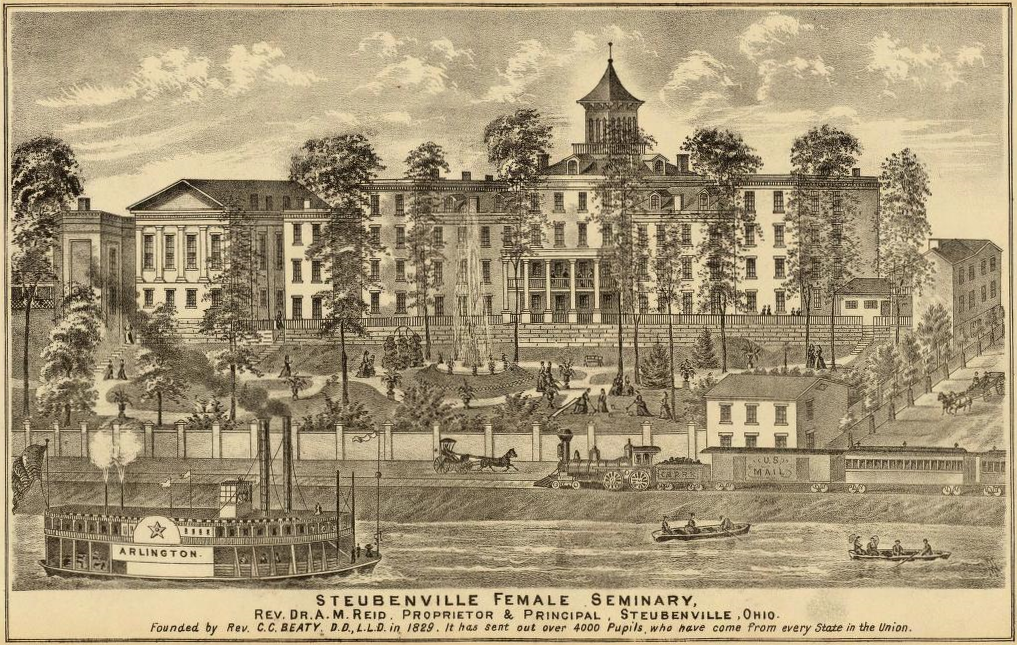
Engraving of the Steubenville Female Seminary

Steubenville Female Seminary, also known as Beatty's Seminary for Young Ladies or Steubenville Seminary, was a female seminary in Steubenville, Ohio. It was founded by Presbyterian minister Charles Clinton Beatty in 1829. Beatty served as Superintendent and his wife, Hetty Elizabeth Beatty, served as principal. The school had 7 students during the first year. The campus was located on South High Street between Adams and South Streets with a view of the surrounding hills.

In 1856, control went to Dr. and Mrs. A.M. Reid. In 1863, they were succeeded by Dr. and Mrs. J.W. Wightman. At its peak, the school educated 150 students at a time. The faculty was usually between 10 and 12 teachers. Many of the students became missionaries. It closed in 1898. Over the life of the institution, the school educated 5,000 women.

Following its closing the buildings were used for a variety of purposes, including apartments. They were demolished in 1953 to make way for the High Street Thoroughfare, today known as State Route 7.

== Notable alumni ==
- Samantha Knox Condit (1837–1912), teacher, Presbyterian missionary
- Amanda McFarland (1837–1898), first woman missionary in Alaska
- Virginia Penny (1826–1913), social reformer and economist
- Emily Evans Tassey (1823–1899), teacher, inventor, patent holder
- Eva Griffith Thompson (1842–1925), newspaper editor
