= Ann Tsukamoto =

American stem cell researcher and inventor

- Born: July 6, 1952 (age 74); California, United States
- Education: University of California San Diego; University of California Los Angeles
- Scientific career
- Fields: Stem cell biology
- Workplaces: University of California San Francisco; SyStemix, Inc. StemCells, Inc.

Ann S. Tsukamoto Weissman (born July 6, 1952) is an Asian American stem cell researcher and inventor. In 1991, she co-patented a process that allowed the human stem cell to be isolated and demonstrated their potential in treating patients with metastatic breast cancer. Tsukamoto has received a total of 13 patents in her career, the majority of them having to do with human hematopoietic stem cells.

Tsukamoto’s research and contributions in the medical field have led to groundbreaking advancements in stem cell research, especially in understanding the blood systems of cancer patients. Her work has shown potential treatments for cancers and neurological disorders, for which there were previously thought to be none.

== Career ==
Ann Tsukamoto was born in California on July 6, 1952. She completed her bachelor's degree at the University of California San Diego and her Ph.D. in immunology and microbiology at the University of California Los Angeles. Tsukamoto did most of her postdoctoral work at the University of California, San Francisco. Here, she worked on the wnt-1 gene and developed a transgenic model for breast cancer. Wnt-1 was later discovered to be a key player in the stem cell self-renewal pathway. She joined the biotech company SyStemix from 1989 to 1997, where she co-discovered the human hematopoietic stem cell (hHSC) and played a leading role in the launch of the clinical research program for this cell. The purified hHSC was shown to be cancer-free when isolated from the cancer-contaminated hematopoietic mobilized blood of patients with disseminated cancer, and it successfully regenerated the patients' blood-forming system after myeloablative chemotherapy. Tsukamoto joined StemCells Inc. in 1998, where she has held several leadership roles overseeing the isolation and application of human neural and liver stem cells for various diseases. She led the scientific team that discovered the human central nervous system stem cell and identified a second candidate stem cell for the liver. Under her guidance, the human neural stem cell transitioned into early clinical development for all three components of the central nervous system: the brain, spinal cord, and eye. The biological potential and activity of these cells were demonstrated in some of the patients, mirroring the results observed in preclinical rodent studies.

As of 2017, Tsukamoto is an inventor on seven issued United States patents, six of which are related to the human hematopoietic stem cell. By 2021, she had reached a total of 13 patents. Aside from her accomplishments in patent applications and grants, in 2023 she was awarded with the Changemaker Award from her alma mater (University of California San Diego) for her breakthrough in isolating blood stem cells. The work of Ann Tsukamoto has been of immense value to the field of regenerative medicine, particularly in the treatment and research of neurodegenerative diseases. Her research on human neural stem cells has resulted in potential therapeutic treatments for conditions such as spinal cord injury, Alzheimer's disease, and Parkinson's disease. Isolation of these stem cells has been a platform for further clinical research, testing their ability to repair and regenerate damaged neural tissues. Besides her contribution to hematopoietic and neural stem cell biology, her research and work has influenced advancements in gene therapy and tissue engineering, demonstrating the far-reaching nature of her scientific contribution.

Tsukamoto has advocated for diversity in STEM, mentoring early-career researchers and lobbying for programs to integrate more women into the biotechnology industry. She has given talks regarding determination and collaboration in scientific inquiry, particularly among women and other minority groups within the discipline.

== Patents ==
Out of her 13 patents, 7 were grants with 6 that revolved around human hematopoietic stem cells (October 1991-June 1999). The other grant being for methods of gene transfers (July 1999). The other 6 patents were applications, 4 on enriched pancreatic stem cell (September 2006-March 2011) and progenitor cell populations and 2 on genome editing of human neural stem cells using nucleases (October 2017-August 2023). Ann Tsukamoto’s work in stem cell research has had a profound impact on regenerative medicine. In 1989, while working at SyStemix, Inc., she co-discovered the human hematopoietic stem cell (hHSC), a major breakthrough in the field of hematopoiesis. Tsukamoto was among the co-inventors of the patent, Human Hematopoietic Stem Cell, which was granted on October 29, 1991. The patent detailed a process for isolating such cells, and has since become pivotal in the evolution of bone marrow transplant procedures for curing blood cancers and diseases. Up to 2021, Tsukamoto had acquired a total of 13 patents, six of which were specifically aimed at the human hematopoietic stem cell. The patents have played a significant role in the evolution of stem cell therapy for various blood-linked conditions, with new hope being provided to chemotherapy and other treatment-weakening patients' immune systems.

In addition to her pioneering work in blood stem cells, Tsukamoto has also made significant contributions to the treatment of neurodegenerative disorders. During her time at StemCells, Inc., she was the leader of the team that first isolated human neural stem cells, which have therapeutic potential for the treatment of diseases like Alzheimer's, Parkinson's disease, and spinal cord injury. Her work has laid the foundation for ongoing clinical trials of stem cell-based therapies to treat central nervous system disorders. Tsukamoto's lab demonstrated that these cells have the ability to restore damaged tissue in preclinical models, laying the groundwork for future clinical uses in patients. Tsukamoto's extensive patent portfolio and progress in stem cell biology continue to shape the field of regenerative medicine. Her pioneering work as a hematopoietic and neural stem cell scientist continues to influence the field of regenerative medicine and inspire future researchers.
