= Rose Cumming =

American interior decorator (1887 – 1968)

- Rose Cumming
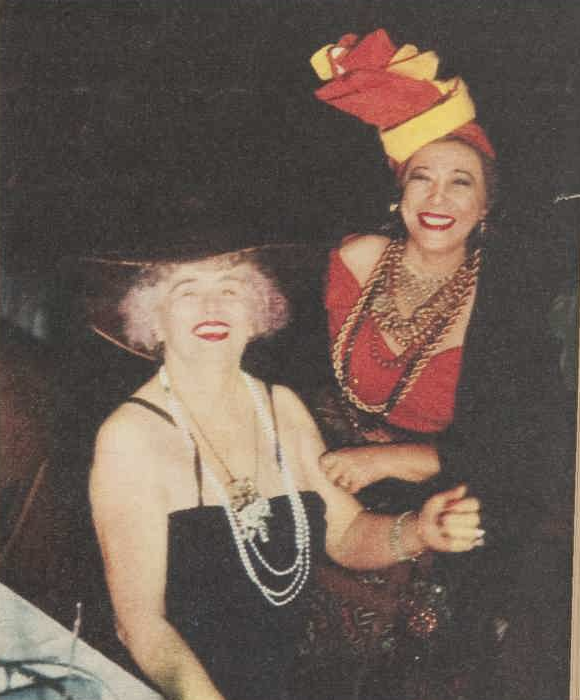
- Born: 1887
- Died: March 21, 1968

Rose Cumming (1887 – March 21, 1968) was a flamboyant and eccentric interior decorator whose career was based in New York.

== Biography ==
Rose Cumming was born on an Australian sheep station in New South Wales. In 1917 she came to New York with her sister, silent-screen actress Dorothy Cumming.

Following advice of her friend Frank Crowninshield, editor of Vanity Fair, Cumming decided to become a decorator. She worked for Mary Buehl before opening her own shop in 1921. Cumming's shop was her decorating office and a retail shop for antiques and fabrics. She put her best furniture in the window of the shop left the lights on at night, which nobody had ever done. Her shop sold Bromo-Seltzer bottles and empty candy boxes alongside fine French furniture. As she explained, “It’s all salesmanship."

She was known for chinoiserie, displayed in the Chinese wallpapers of her often-photographed drawing room, and for baroque and rococo Venetian, South German and Austrian furniture, at a time when conservative New York tastes ran to Louis XV and English Georgian furnishings. Her color sense favored saturated, dramatic tones. She brought chintz to informal dressing rooms and bedrooms, inaugurated the vogue for smoked mirrors veined with gold and extended her love of reflective and lacquered surfaces to lacquered walls, satin upholstery and the metallic wallpapers she invented.

In Cumming's own town house, the living room had early-eighteenth-century hand-painted Chinese wallpaper with a silvery background and Louis XV furniture. Conventional lamps were one of her pet hates, so black candles lighted the room. At the top of her townhouse was the infamous “Ugly Room” filled with predatory images of snakes, vultures, boars and monkeys.

Her clients included Marlene Dietrich, Mary Pickford, and Norma Shearer.

She designed and printed fabrics. Her sister Eileen Cecil, a former editor of Harpers Bazaar, stylist, and advertising force in her own right, carried on the business after Cumming's death in 1968. Later the merchandise line was sold to Dessin Fournir, and then to Wells Abbott. Her great-niece Sarah Cumming Cecil carried on the atelier "Rose Cumming Design", now based in Portland, ME, presenting a stripped-down simplified style.
