= Emily E. Tassey =

American inventor

- Born: Emily Evans Rowland; December 15, 1823; McKeesport, PA
- Died: November 27, 1899
- Resting place: McKeesport, PA
- Occupation(s): Inventor, Teacher

Emily Evans Tassey (née Rowland, 1823 –1899) was a 19th century American inventor. Tassey earned patents for five inventions, all related to marine propulsion technology from 1876 to 1880.

They include improved apparatus for raising sunken vessels, improvements in siphon propeller pumps and a dredging machine. Tassey was one of a small group of women during the nineteenth century who specialized in machine inventions.

== Biography ==
Emily Evans Rowland was born on December 15, 1823, to a father who was a merchant and owner of a textile mill, a general store and a post office in the town of McKeesport, located east of Pittsburgh, Pennsylvania. Emily was educated as a teacher at Steubenville Seminary in Ohio and was a teacher in the McKeesport School prior to being married to William D. Tassey a lawyer, in 1845. They had three children but her husband died unexpectedly in 1857 while on a trip to Tennessee, so Tassey returned to teaching in the public schools in Pittsburgh and McKeesport. It is possible she turned to invention as a means to support herself and her children.

Her McKeesport hometown was a booming port on the Monongahela River during the 1870s when Tassey began inventing in earnest. Due largely to the dominant influence of the local steel mill works and supporting industries, river traffic was brisk, carrying coal, ore, coke and finished-steel products. In addition steamboats carried cargo and passengers from McKeesport downriver to the Ohio River and onward to ports on the Mississippi. In addition, the region's first dry-docks were built in McKeesport in 1836 to repair river craft, thus offering Tassey a natural environment for inventing improvements in marine technology. In only four years, from 1876 to 1880, she would earn five patents—all related to marine technology and propulsion systems in spite of the history of the invention field in 1880 when "women comprised a scant 1-2% of all patent recipients."

At the World's Columbian Exposition in Chicago in 1893, Tassey exhibited two of her inventions, improvement in siphon propeller-pumps, 1876, and the siphon propeller-pump inventions, 1880

Unfortunately, Tassey did not gain wealth of fame in her lifetime.

Tassey died on November 27, 1899. She is buried in The McKeesport and Versailles Cemetery in McKeesport, Pennsylvania.

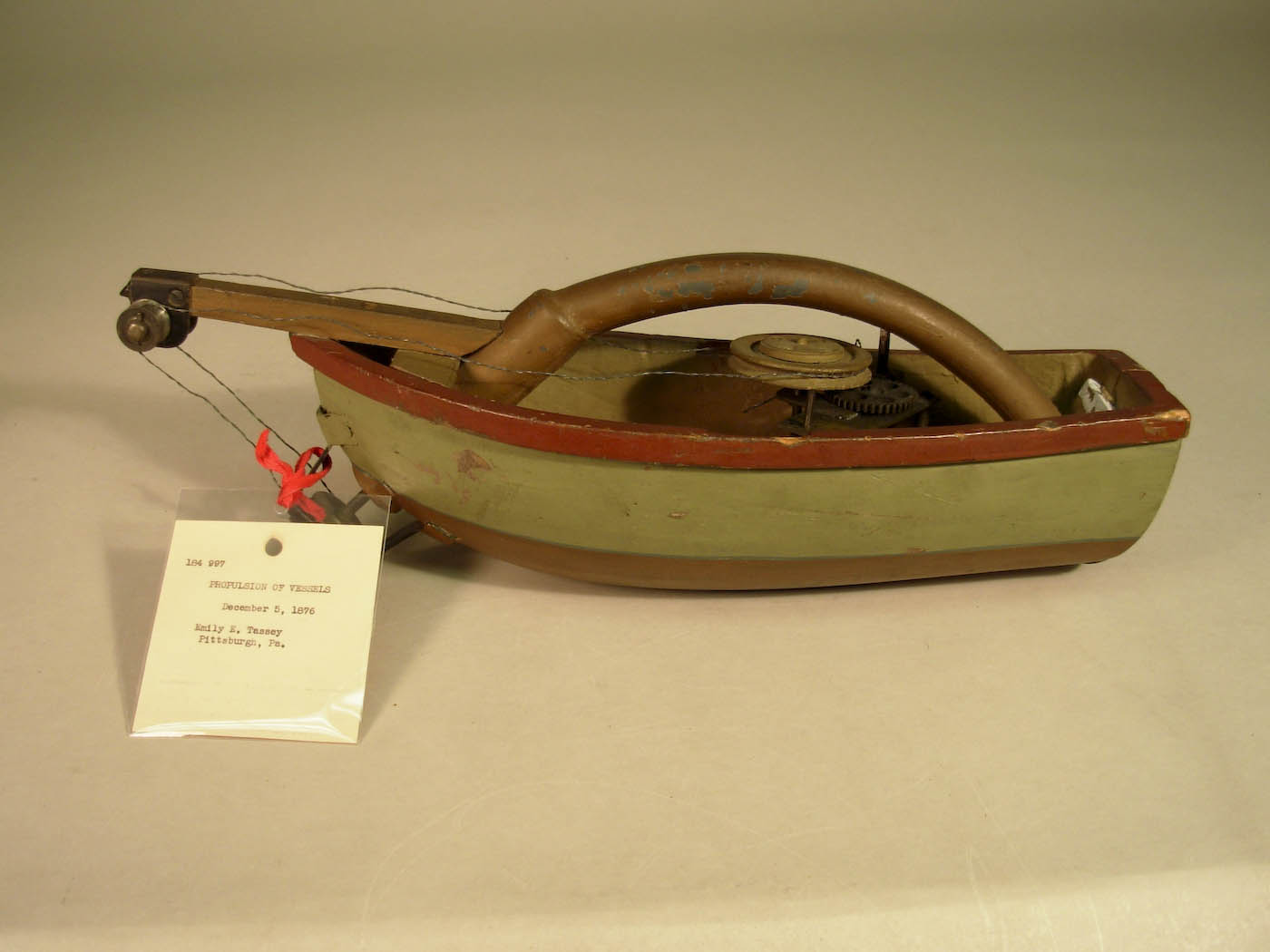
Tassey's patented Model-Improvement in Propulsion of Vessels, 1876, Patent Number 184,997, Hagley Museum and Library

== Patents ==
- Improvement in apparatus for raising sunken vessels, 1876
- Improvement in siphon propeller-pumps, 1876
- Improvement in propulsion of vessels, 1876
- Improvement in dredging machines, 1876
- Siphon propeller-pump, 1880

== Collections ==
- Improvement in Propulsion of Vessels, December 5, 1876, Patent number: 184,997, Hagley Museum and Library, Wilmington, Delaware. Patent illustration, application.
- Siphon Propeller-Pump, August 3, 1880, Patent number: 230,723, Hagley Museum and Library, Wilmington, Delaware.
