= Karen Mohlke =

Researcher in Biology

Karen L. Mohlke
- Citizenship: United States
- Education: PhD
- Alma mater: University of Michigan
- Known for: Human genetics
- Scientific career
- Fields: Molecular biology, Genetics
- Institutions: National Institutes of Health; University of North Carolina, Chapel Hill
- Thesis: (1996)
- Doctoral advisor: David Ginsburg

Karen L. Mohlke is a biologist at University of North Carolina, Chapel Hill. She is known for her work in human genetics, especially in the area of diabetes research. She was one of the first researchers to use exome array genotyping.

== Life and education ==
Mohlke received a Bachelor of Science degree from Cornell University in Biological Sciences in 1991. She went on to receive a Doctor of Philosophy degree in Human Genetics at University of Michigan in 1996.

== Work ==
Following her graduation, Mohlke was awarded a postdoctoral fellowship at University of Michigan from 1996 to 1998. She then became a Research Fellow at the National Institutes of Health until 2004, in the National Human Genome Research Institute.

In 2004, Mohlke began working for University of North Carolina, Chapel Hill in the School of Medicine, studying the genetics of complex traits and diseases. The Mohlke lab is currently identifying genetic variants and genes that influence common human traits with complex inheritance patterns, and is seeking to understand the biological function of the identified variants and genes.

In 2012, Mohlke was a senior author of a study finding new variants of three genes (TBC1D30, KANK1 and PAM) related to diabetes. This study was significant as it was one of the first studies to use exome array genotyping, an alternative to genetic sequencing. Mohlke said:

"The exome array allowed us to test a large number of individuals in this case, more than 8,000 people very efficiently. We expect that this type of analysis will be useful for finding low-frequency variants associated with many complex traits, including obesity or cancer."

Her research goals include identifying genetic loci responsible for genetic diseases; identifying important locations within these loci for testing; and understanding the functional mechanisms express these genes as physical characteristics.

== Selected publications ==
- Scott, L. J.; Mohlke, K. L.; Bonnycastle, L. L.; Willer, C. J.; Li, Y.; Duren, W. L.; Boehnke, M. (2007). "A genome-wide association study of type 2 diabetes in Finns detects multiple susceptibility variants". Science. 316 (5829): 1341–1345. Bibcode:2007Sci...316.1341S. doi:10.1126/science.1142382. PMC 3214617. PMID 17463248.
- Mohlke, KL; Boehnke, M; Abecasis, GR (2008). "Metabolic and cardiovascular traits: an abundance of recently identified common genetic variants". Human Molecular Genetics. 17 (R2): R102–R108. doi:10.1093/hmg/ddn275. PMC 2570060. PMID 18852197.
- Huyghe, JR; Jackson, AU; Fogarty, MP; Buchkovich, ML; Stančáková, A; Stringham, HM; Sim, X; Yang, L; Fuchsberger, C; Cederberg, H; Chines, PS; Teslovich, TM; Romm, JM; Ling, H; McMullen, I; Ingersoll, R; Pugh, EW; Doheny, KF; Neale, BM; Daly, MJ; Kuusisto, J; Scott, LJ; Kang, HM; Collins, FS; Abecasis, GR; Watanabe, RM; Boehnke, M; Laakso, M; Mohlke, KL (Feb 2013). "Exome array analysis identifies new loci and low-frequency variants influencing insulin processing and secretion". Nat Genet. 45 (2): 197–201. doi:10.1038/ng.2507. PMC 3727235. PMID 23263489.
