= Mary Brush =

American engineer

Mary Brush (fl. 1815) of Davenport, Iowa, was an American inventor and one of the first American women to be granted a patent by the U.S. patent office. Her patent, granted on 21 July 1815, was for a corset. It improved on the design and was meant to "preserve the shape of the womanly figure." The Cincinnati Enquirer, in 1908, identified her as the second American woman to be granted a patent.
