= Asha Peta Thompson =

British entrepreneur and textile designer

- Education: Birmingham City University; Central Saint Martins
- Employer(s): Brunel University London; Intelligent Textiles Limited
- Known for: Inventing smart textiles Wearable technology

Asha Peta Thompson is a British entrepreneur and textile designer. She is the co-founder and director of Intelligent Textiles, who create wearable technology including e-uniforms for infantry.

== Early life and education ==
Peta Thompson studied fashion at Birmingham City University. She enjoyed crochet and knitting. She joined Central Saint Martins for a master's degree in textile design. She worked with a special education school to develop textiles that could be used to support children with autism. She developed a wheelchair cover with textile pressure sensors that could prevent pressure sores.

== Career ==
Peta Thompson develops electronic textiles. In 2002 she joined Brunel University London as a research fellow working on products for people with disabilities. Peta Thompson was based in the Brunel Design for Life Centre, where she began to work with industrial design lecturer Stanley Swallow. Together the pair developed a Talking Waistcoat, which included fabric sensors, for people suffering from cerebral palsy. Peta Thompson was not convinced by the bulky electronic devices that people with cerebral palsy had previously used, and began to explore conductive thread. The waistcoat included sensors that allowed people with cerebral palsy to access computers. Whilst demonstrating their product at a European trade show, Peta Thompson and Swallow met Australian Wool Innovation, who were interested in working with organisations that could use Australian wool. They began to manufacture conductive fabrics using a weaving mill that belonged to John Lewis & Partners. In 2002 they formed a spin-out company Intelligent Textiles Limited. Intelligent Textiles Limited has partnered with Lincoln Fabrics, a Canadian factory, as well as a weavers in Lancashire to manufacture their materials. At first they operated out of a small studio in London, working with a clothing company to integrate an MP3 player into a jacket.

Peta Thompson learnt that soldiers have to carry over 60 AA batteries and often suffer from tangled charging cables. Instead, Intelligent Textiles Limited looked to develop electronic textiles that could be retro-fitted into military uniform. They own over 17 patents and several trademarks. Limited Peta Thompson pitched their idea, Broadsword, to the Canadian Armed Forces. The United States Army and United States Marine Corps also became interested. They were supported by BAE Systems and the Centre for Defence Enterprise. Their e-uniforms significantly reduce the weight carried by infantry, and went into trials in 2015.

She has appeared on The Bottom Line and BBC Woman's Hour.
