= Ginny Scales-Medeiros =

American author and inventor

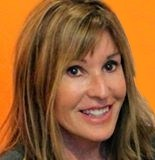
Ginny Scales-Medeiros

Virginia “Ginny” Scales-Medeiros is an American author and inventor known for her novel "What is Normal?", inventor of world-renowned blacklight sunless tanning system, also starring in "What is the Electric Car?" documentary, co-author of "What is the Electric Car?" book, top salesperson in the automotive industry year after year, and holding seminars for women on what to look for when buying cars.

== Biography ==
Scales-Medeiros was born in upstate New York, on her own at 15, finishing only the 9th grade and later moving to Northern California’s Bay Area.

Scales-Medeiros has been a top automotive salesperson, breaking into the predominantly-male auto industry in the late 70's, selling a car her first day, and receiving a plaque which read: "Salesman of the month", noted for making top salesperson year after year. She created a female car-buying clinic, teaching the basics of what to look for when buying a car, empowering women to make informed purchasing decisions for themselves.

Scales-Medeiros was on the board of directors for ZAP (Zero Air Pollution), a publicly traded company, giving up gas transportation completely in 2007 in favor of all-electric vehicles, eventually landing her in the documentary "What is the Electric Car?".

Ginny is an entrepreneur with multiple patents/trademarks. The product widely sold in World Class spa resorts, catalogs and on QVC. Scales-Medeiros made appearances on NBC, CBS, FOX News and was written about in many national magazines.

Ginny’s first novel. “What Is Normal?” made the 2012 top 40 most inspirational list in Gladys Magazine. Scales-Medeiros has been in print and online news publications, on radio, online talk shows and TV, talking about her book, and other projects. "What is Normal?" has been adapted into the screenplay, “WIN”, based on her novel. Ginny is a co-author of “What is the Electric Car?” along with many celebrities such as Jay Leno and Ed Begley Jr., Jeremy Guthrie, Larry Hagman, and Fabio each writing a chapter. You can find Ginny on her social media as well. Facebook Twitter & LinkedIn

== What is Normal? (novel) ==
Her first novel “What is Normal?” has achieved critical acclaim with a spot on the Top 40 Most Inspirational List in Gladys Magazine, and has been adapted into the screenplay “WIN: The Movie”.

This story follows the life of a young girl, Sue, who was born into abuse and poverty. Sue defeated the odds, winning through her own grit, determination and humorous ingenuity. She made her way from the backwoods of upstate New York, and lived in a trailer with her uneducated, teenage parents—a structure that eventually became a chicken coop. Feeling invisible, she learned to take advantage of that invisibility and embarked on a Dickensesque-lifestyle of petty theft. By the time she was a young teenager, she had discovered the misguided benefits of drugs and alcohol. Sue emerged from the most likely NOT to succeed…into a success. On her own at 15, she invented a product sold on QVC. Battling her demons, Sue finally WINs over self-destruction and the world’s fantasy of What Normal is—and found her authentic self.

In 2015, Nemours Publishing (a division of Nemours Marketing, Inc.) signed a contract to take over the publishing of Ginny Scales-Medeiros’s novel “What is Normal?”

In 2021, "What is Normal?" was released as an audio book as well. It is currently available in the iTunes store and Amazon. iTunes LinkAmazon Link

== What is the Electric Car? (documentary and co-author) ==
Giving up gas transportation completely in 2007 in favor of all-electric vehicles, Scales-Medeiros starred in the documentary "What is the Electric Car?". Her collaboration with Scott DuPont continued with her Co-Authoring of the book “What is the Electric Car?” along with several other celebrities such as Jay Leno and Ed Begley Jr., Jeremy Guthrie, Larry Hagman, and Fabio each writing a chapter.

== Black Light Sunless Tanning System (invention) ==
An inventor with multiple patents and trademarks, her patented sunless tanning system won first place in a national contest for new ideas, and has been featured in fashion magazines, television, radio and offered in world-class spa resorts, doctors offices, sold on QVC as well as an As-Seen-TV product.

=== Animal activism ===
Scales-Medeiros is also an animal activist, often donating 100% of the proceeds from her book signings go to non-kill shelters.
