= Anna Baldwin =

American dairy farmer and inventor

Anna Baldwin (1832–1888) was an American dairy farmer and inventor, who was most famous for her Hygienic Glove Milker, patented on February 18, 1879. She operated a dairy farm in Newark, New Jersey.

== Background ==
Anna Elizabeth Corey Baldwin was born September 7, 1832, to Ashbel W. Corey and Anna Elizabeth Corey.

Anna married George Thompson Baldwin and had one child, Anna Elizabeth Baldwin, who later married Alexander Muir Linnett. Anna and her husband operated a dairy stand in Newark, New Jersey.

Anna Baldwin died October 6, 1888, at the age of 56 at her residence located at 757 High Street, Newark, New Jersey.

== Innovations ==
From 1860 to the late 1870s, Baldwin filed for a total of five patents, one of which was a reissue for an earlier patent, which had a large impact on dairy farming.

Baldwin received her first patent in 1869 for a device that offered an improved method of treating milk to produce pomade and butter. This invention would allow farmers to produce pomade and butter at a significantly faster rate, which led to an increase in income.

One year later, in 1869, Baldwin designed two new inventions; one was an improved milk separator and the other was an improved milk cooler. Baldwin would later reissue a patent for her milk cooler to implement some improvements to her design in 1871. Again, the main point being addressed was how to maximize farmers' output for commercial sale and use.

Baldwin's most significant innovation was the Hygienic Glove Milker, which was patented on February 18, 1879. This device was a milking machine that used suction to expedite milk output, by sucking on all four teats at once, and minimizing the strain on the farmers. The description of the device is a sack or case of elastic rubber that is placed over the udder, the top of the cup contained a contracting band in order to prevent air from entering the case, thus loosening the suction. From there, the tubes are connected to a pump similar to that of a water pump. By using the pump, the user would cause the reciprocating pressure from the air to pull on the cow's udder, producing milk and coming out of the top of the pump into a bucket.

Baldwin designed this machine to generate the same output as the catheter milking machine, that was previously invented in 1819, without the downsides. Baldwin's machine proved to be a less invasive design. Whereas the catheter milking machine used tubes made of wood or featuring quills that were inserted into the teats, forcing the sphincter muscle to open and allowing milk to flow out of the mammary gland, the Hygienic Glove Milker utilized basic suction to create similar results.

Additionally, the usage of a catheter milking machine could result in various problems, such as spreading diseases, weakening the cow's sphincter muscles which leads to continuous dribbling, and general injury to the teats. Due to Baldwin's design, farmers were able to safely increase the amount of milk they could produce without harming their cows, ultimately benefiting the farm.

== Impact ==
Due to the continuous suction on the cow's udder, the cow's mammary tissue would often be irritated, causing the cow to kick in pain. Improved milking machines appeared around 1883 from other farmers such as James P. Martin. However, it was not until Carl Gustav de Laval, a Swedish engineer, that the first commercially successful milking machine was designed. It was a culmination of Carl Gustav de Laval and Anna Baldwin's inventions that led to the modern dairy farming method.
