= Emily C. Duncan =

Emily Cornelius Duncan (née Forbes; born 1849) was an American inventor who received two patents in 1903 and 1904 for banking-related calculators.

Duncan was born in Coral, Illinois as Emily Cornelius Forbes and later resided in Centralia, Wisconsin (which later became Wisconsin Rapids) and Jennings, Louisiana. She invented new banking calculators and was mentioned in Inventive Age magazine in February 1905. Duncan was recognized as one of many women who worked in the age of technology before the actual computer. She was married to inventor James Eugene Duncan and although he was believed to be the only inventor in the family written accounts from her granddaughter indicated she assisted her husband with numerous inventions.

Based on her written statement provided in the original patent application she stated that her goal was to provide a "simple and readily understood structure with which computations ordinarily requiring considerable time and care may be accurately and quickly made". The other objective of her invention was "to provide a device of the above character in which parts may be readily substituted, so that computations of different kinds may be made".

The first apparatus was intended for computing interest in 1 at six, seven, or eight per cent. The calculator was first designed to easily be used by any mathematician, but her original patent provided detailed illustration of two apparatuses with details explaining how the calculator was to be operated. The invention was designed more specifically for computing in hundreds.

In 1904, she received another patent for an invention relating to improvements in calculators. Her objective of this invention was to improve the construction of time-calculators and to provide a more durable device designed primarily for determining the number of days between any two dates within a year with absolute accuracy.
