= Elizabeth Sthreshley Townsend =

American inventor

Elizabeth Sthreshley Townsend (died 1919) was an American inventor who held patents on multiple inventions. She is chiefly known for inventing the punctograph, a braille typewriter.

== Biography ==
Townsend was born in Vicksburg, Mississippi, and moved to Texas at a young age. She graduated from the Sam Houston Normal Institute in 1886, and soon began working for the literary department of the Texas School for the Blind and Visually Impaired. In 1889, she received a patent on the first Braille typewriter. She marketed them heavily, selling twelve to the Texas School for the Blind at a cost of around $2000 per typewriter. In 1892, Townsend received a patent on a slate, also for the blind.

In 1894, Townsend married Texas photographer George Townsend. She left the Texas School for the blind the same year, and began working in her husband's photography studio, on Congress Avenue. She learned how to use X-ray equipment when George adopted the equipment. Later, she worked at the Torbett Sanatarium, dying in 1919.
