= StemCells, Inc. =

American biopharmaceutical company

- Type: Public
- Industry: Biotechnology
- Founded: 1 January 1992
- Headquarters: Newark, United States
- Key people: Ian Massey (CEO); Irving L. Weissman, M.D. (Founder)
- Website: www.stemcellsinc.com

StemCells, Inc. is a public biopharmaceutical company headquartered in Newark, California, that is developing purified human neural stem cells (HuCNS-SCs) in the hopes of treating central nervous system disorders and paralysis. StemCells' HuCNS-SCs have the ability to differentiate into the three main types of cells found in the central nervous system: neurons, astrocytes and oligodendrocytes.

They are being studied in early stage trials.

In March 2020, Microbot Medical Inc. announced the appointment of Eyal Morag, M.D. to Chief Medical Officer.
