= Barbara Beskind =

American inventor and designer (born 1924)

- Born: Barbara Knickerbocker; 1924 (age 101–102)
- Education: Syracuse University
- Occupations: Inventor, designer, occupational therapist and author

Barbara M. Knickerbocker Beskind (born 1924) is a former occupational therapist, author, inventor and designer. After a length career as an occupational therapist for the United States Army, Barbara opened the first independent practice in occupational therapy in the United States, filed numerous patents for occupational therapy, and published three books. At the age of 89, Barbara joined IDEO, where she continues to design new products for the elderly and physically impaired.

== Early education and career ==
Barbara Beskind, born in 1924, aspired to be an inventor from a young age. Growing up during the Great Depression, she crafted her own toys, including a hobbyhorse made from old tires, which taught her about design and gravity. Despite her ambitions, Barbara was unable to apply for any industrial design schools, as they did not accept women during that time. Consequently, she pursued a degree in home economics at Syracuse University, graduating in 1945. She then enlisted in the Army as an occupational therapist with the Army's Occupational Therapy (OT) training program, serving for 20 years and retiring with the final rank of major. During her time in the military, she developed new therapeutic programs and practices to help veterans recover from injury and trauma. After the military, Barbara established the Princeton Center for Learning Disorders, pioneering the first independent occupational therapy practice in the U.S. She also secured six patents for inflatable devices designed to assist children with balance issues. Fueled by her experiences and passion for helping those in need, in her late 80s, Barbara joined the design firm IDEO, contributing her insights to develop products aimed at improving the lives of older adults.

== IDEO ==
After Barbara had already retired at the age of 89, she watched a 60 Minutes segment featuring the founder of IDEO, David Kelley. Realizing that Kelley and IDEO valued unique backgrounds, Barbara mailed a letter to Kelley, explaining her background in occupational therapy and her undying passion for inventing solutions for aging populations. Within a week, Barbara received a response and welcomed her to the team in 2013. At IDEO, Barbara brought invaluable insights into aging and accessibility, challenging assumptions and inspiring inclusive design.

At IDEO, Barbara helped design key products focused around mobility and accessibility for aging baby boomers. She developed concepts like a walker-mounted rearview mirror to help seniors with limited hearing, a walking cane designed for better stability, and glasses with face recognition to assist people with low vision. While working with a Japanese company that was designing a replacement for bifocals, Barbara's advisory input led the IDEO team to reflect on their design, allowing them to realize key mistakes they had made when considering the elderly users. She advised against using small batteries in the device, noting the difficulty that older adults would have replacing them. She instead suggested designing the product to be rechargeable, urging the designers to prioritize function over aesthetics, emphasizing that good design starts with empathy.

== "Trekker" ==
During a speech Barbara gave to the White House, her message was “design with us, not for us”, which embodies her design philosophy. Barbara has lived in at least 3 different senior residences for at least 8 years, observing the spoken and unspoken needs of the elderly. During this time, she observed the misuse, premature use, and inappropriate use of the walker. Barbara noticed poor posture, abnormal gates, and pressure on the shoulders of those using walkers. In 2016, Barbara began work on a dynamic walker, which she called the “trekker”, to address these pain points. The design features long, vertical handles, making it difficult to lean on the “trekker” and improving the user’s posture. Although she has had limited success with the commercial version of this product, She claims this is her most vigorous design attempt. For her personal use, Barbara uses a pair of $30 Costco ski poles with modified handles to reduce blister formation, a flashlight to help her visual impairment, and markers to differentiate between the left and right pole.
