= Charles Clinton Beatty =

American minister (1800–1882)

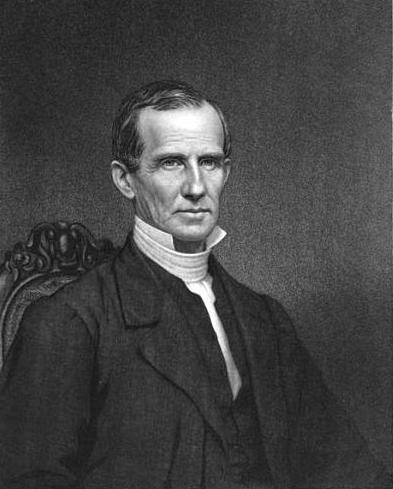
- Charles Clinton Beatty
- Born: January 4, 1800
- Died: October 30, 1882 (aged 82)
- Spouse: Hetty Elizabeth Beatty
- Church: Presbyterian
- Ordained: January 1822 by Presbytery of New Brunswick
- Offices held: Founder of Steubenville Female Seminary

Coat of Arms of Charles Clinton Beatty

Charles Clinton Beatty was a Presbyterian minister, seminary founder, and academic philanthropist.

He was born on January 4, 1800 in Princeton, New Jersey. His grandfather, Charles Beatty, was a Presbyterian minister, and his father, Erkuries Beatty, was an officer during the Revolutionary War. Beatty was of Scotch Irish descent. He attended College of New Jersey (now Princeton University), and its Seminary (now Princeton Theological Seminary).

Beatty was licensed to preach by the Presbytery of New Brunswick in January 1822. He was elected Moderator of the General Assembly in May 1862. He was a director and professor at Western Theological Seminary (now Pittsburgh Theological Seminary). In 1829, he and his wife founded the Steubenville Female Seminary in Steubenville, Ohio and he was superintendent.

In 1861, he received an honorary degree from Washington College. He was elected trustee of Washington College on September 1, 1863.

On November 6, 1863, Beatty, offered $50,000 to entice ailing Washington College and Jefferson schools to unify. Beatty had a number of familiar and social connections to Washington College, including a stint in leadership of the Synod of Wheeling. This inducement was enough to encourage the schools to unify as Washington & Jefferson College. On April 12, 1865, he was elected trustee of the unified Washington & Jefferson College, a position he held until his death.

He died on October 30, 1882.

Religious titles
Preceded by The Rev. Jno. Chester Backus	Moderator of the 74th General Assembly of the Presbyterian Church in the United States of America (Old School); 1862–1863	Succeeded by The Rev. John Hunter Morrison
