= Marija Šimanska =

Latvian chemist of Polish heritage

- Born: April 23, 1922; Daugavpils, Latvia
- Died: July 10, 1995 (aged 73); Riga, Latvia
- Other names: Maria Szymańska, Maria Vladislavovna Šimanskaâ
- Occupation: chemist
- Years active: 1948–1994

Marija Šimanska (Polish: Maria Szymańska; 1922–1995) was a Latvian chemist of Polish heritage. She was one of the most prolific scientists of her era in Latvia and was honored with numerous medals and awards.

== Biography ==
Marija Šimanska was born on 23 April 1922 Daugavpils, Latvia to Polish parents. She finished her high school studies in Polish in 1940 at the Daugavpils Gymnasium and enrolled in the University of Latvia. After only one semester in the pharmacy school, she left Riga and returned to Daugavpils to join the Polish underground. She was arrested and sent to the Stutthof concentration camp in February 1943. At the end of the war in 1945, she returned to school and completed her degree in chemistry in 1948. She went to work in the Forestry Problems Institute and simultaneously studied for her PhD. When she received her doctorate in 1952, she became one of the first three Soviet women to have attained a doctorate in chemistry.

Between 1957 and 1975 she was the deputy director of the Institute of Organic Synthesis and she founded the catalytic synthesis lab there, where she researched heterocyclic compounds and catalytic transformations. She developed many new catalysts, analytical reagents, and medical processes and was one of the most prolific scientists of Latvia. Šimanska published over 450 research papers and was the creator of 56 inventions. She also served as the editor of Latvijas Ķīmijas Žurnāls (Latvian Chemical Journal) of the Latvian Academy of Sciences and Latvijas Farmaceitu Žurnāls (Latvian Pharmaceutical journal). Šimanska also served as the president of the Latvian Pharmacists' Scientific Society from 1978 to 1994.

During her career, she received recognition for her work, including the Latvian Soviet Socialist Republic State Laureate Prize in 1965; the David Hieronymus Grindel Medal; the Solomons Hillers Medal; and the Arvīds Kalniņš Medal. In 1992, she was made the President of the Latvian Union of Poles and that same year was made an honorary member of the Latvian Academy of Sciences. Posthumously, she was awarded the Gustavs Vanags Laureate Prize and diploma for her research on Non-traditional methods of catalytic chemistry of heterocyclic compounds.

She died on 10 July 1995 in Riga and was buried in the Daugavpils Catholic cemetery.

== Selected works ==
- Šimanska, Marija (1989). Aptiekāru svaros– godaprāts (in Russian). Riga: Cīņa.
- Šimanska, Marija Vladislavovna (1990). Vanadievye katalizatory okislenija geterocikličeskich soedinenij (in Russian). Riga: Zinātne.
- Šimanska, Marija (1990). "Kā likvidēt zāļu deficītu?". Latvijas Ārsts (3): 78–79.

== Bibliography ==
- Caune, Andris (2004). Totalitarian occupation regimes in Latvia in 1940-1964: research of the Commission of the Historians of Latvia, 2003 (in Latvian). Latvijas Vēstures institūta apgāds. ISBN 978-9984-601-56-4.
- Silin̦š, Leonids (2003). Latvieši Štuthofas koncentrācijas nometnē: 1942 - 1945 (in Latvian). Fonds Latvijas Vēsture. ISBN 978-9984-643-46-5.
- Stradiņš, Jānis; Grosvalds, Ilgars (1994). Nauka polska a Łotwa, w: Kultura polska na Łotwie (in Polish). Riga, Latvia: Ambasada RP w Rydze.
