= Elizabeth Ann Louisa Mackay =

Elizabeth Ann Louisa Mackay (23 January 1843 - 24 August 1908) was a New Zealand farmer, community leader, inventor, and feminist. Born and raised in Godmanchester, Huntingdonshire, England, Elizabeth traveled alone, while pregnant, to Nelson, New Zealand, where she met Robert Mackay, her husband. Elizabeth actively engaged with the community and had a reputation for being outspoken, independent, and innovative. She died on 24 August 1908. Despite her memorable character, her inventions were forgotten over time and she is little-known today.

== Biography ==
Elizabeth Ann Louisa Mackay was originally Elizabeth Ann Budge. She was born on 23 January 1843 in Godmanchester, Huntingdonshire, England. She was the daughter of Matthew Budge, a laborer, and Ann Church.

In October 1863, Elizabeth boarded the Anne Dymes to travel to Nelson, New Zealand. During this trip, disaster struck and a storm hit the ship which led to a shortage of food for passengers. In January 1864, while still on board ship, Elizabeth gave birth to a daughter, Emma Anne Dymes Budge, whose father, William George Maill, had not joined them on the voyage. The ship reached Nelson on 2 March 1864.

Four years later, Elizabeth Budge married Robert Mackay and changed her name to Elizabeth Ann Louisa Mackay. Together, they lived on a quiet farm at Kokorua, close to the mouth of the Whangamoa River. Elizabeth was active in farming activities and owned 125 acres (51 ha) in her own right. A February 1889 article in The Colonist described Elizabeth as possessing strong opinions and an exceedingly independent character. She ardently advocated for women's rights, including education and voting rights. A letter to The Colonist expressed her modern feminist beliefs, emphasising women's moral superiority and strong societal influence through familial roles.

In 1884, due to a severe and unrecorded illness, Elizabeth was ordered by her doctor to move closer to the town where Elizabeth and Robert took the license of the Suburban North Hotel, or the Black Horse, which had been established in 1846 at Wakapuaka. In this community, she was reputed to be carrying around a gun, was called “Ma Mackay” by the town’s residents, and continuously called for improvements in town infrastructure such as roads, fencing, and beautifying the cemetery.

In 1904, Elizabeth and Robert Mackay retired to Nelson where Elizabeth died on 24 August 1908. Her husband followed on 8 June 1913.

== Inventions ==
According to the 1890 Patents, Designs, and Trade-marks first annual report of the registrar, on 9 September, Elizabeth created an invention for an improved pot or pan for cooking purposes, to be called “Mrs. Mackay’s Patent”. The patent was passed. Her invention, which essentially combined a saucepan and colander, reflected Elizabeth’s pride in living in a “nice home fit for anything”.

Later, according to the 1891 Patents, Designs, and Trade-marks second annual report of the registrar, on 25 February, Elizabeth attempted to patent an ointment for exterminating rheumatics which was refused. However, after the acceptance of her first patent, little is known about its development, and its record has virtually disappeared.
