= Isabella Herb =

Anesthetist and pathologist

Isabella Herb (née Coler; November 6, 1863/1864 – May 28, 1943) was an American medical pioneer in the fields of pathology and anesthesiology. Her career spanned more than half a century, ending with her retirement in 1941. She was the first woman physician to specialize in anesthesiology, and the first Mayo Clinic specialist in her areas of expertise. In 1933, Herb designed the Herb–Mueller apparatus for administering ether to patients. She was the head of the Department of Anesthesia at Presbyterian Hospital, and the first woman president of the American Association of Anesthetists.

== Early life ==
Isabella Coler was born in Clyman, Wisconsin, to an American mother, Mary Ann O'Keefe (1841–1915), and a French father, George Coler (1828–1890). The family also included three sisters and one brother. Isabella married Texas musician Charles Albert Herb, the leader of "Herb's Light Guard Band", and was widowed in 1888.

== Education and early career ==
Herb is noted for being the first woman physician to specialize in anesthesiology. She matriculated at Chicago Women's Medical College in 1889 with a goal of becoming a surgeon, graduating in 1892. Her ensuing internship was at Chicago's Mary Thompson Hospital for Women.

She worked as an assistant to the medical staff as well as to Lawrence Prince, who had pioneered both chloroform anesthesia, and the open drop ether process (drops of ether on a patient's mask). Herb later worked as both anesthetist and pathologist for Augustana Hospital in Chicago. She published her case work in 1898, the first woman to publish in those fields of expertise.

Hospital staff department head Albert J. Ochsnerl recommended her in 1899 to the Mayo Clinic in Rochester, Minnesota. The Mayo had experienced exponential growth in its first two decades, and accordingly, the upswing in patient case loads necessitated additional trained medical personnel. In order to free up the Mayo physicians for higher priorities, Herb was brought in to assume pathology and an anesthesia responsibilities. She thereby became the Mayo's first woman specialist in her chosen fields. She worked as the anesthetist for Dr. Charles H. Mayo. Herb remained at the Mayo until 1904, when she left to further her medical studies in Europe.

== Return from Europe and later career ==
Upon her 1905 return from Europe, she held a fellowship in pathology from 1909 to 1941 at Rush Medical College in Chicago, and was the first woman on their staff. She further received a grant from the American Medical Association to work with microbiologist Ludvig Hektoen at the Memorial Institute for Infectious Diseases. In 1909, Arthur Dean Bevan chose her to head the department of anesthesia at Presbyterian Hospital (merged with Rush Medical College in 1969). She was the first woman appointed to the staff of Presbyterian Hospital and was the chief anesthetist from 1909 to 1941.

In 1911, Herb entered the debate over a legal challenge of whether or not it was safe for nurses to administer anesthesia. The New York State Medical Society held that nurses were not specifically licensed for the practice. Herb concurred in the fact that she believed that only doctors could determine the underlying health of the patient before anesthesia should be administered. Nurses countered that they were fully trained to assess the patient's reaction to anesthesia.

During her career, Herb routinely published numerous articles on her field of study. She was named the first woman president of the American Association of Anesthetists.

== Herb–Mueller apparatus ==
The Herb–Mueller apparatus appeared on the medical market around 1933. The name references both Herb, who designed the apparatus, and V. Mueller & Co. of Chicago, the manufacturer. Used by doctors and dentists, it served the dual purpose of administering ether to patients, while being equipped with a suction function to clean up around the patient's surgical area.

== Final years ==
Herb retired in 1941 as professor of surgery (anesthesia), after teaching hundreds of students and training scores of interns. Although her original career goal had been to become a surgeon, her career as a pathologist and anesthetist had been composed of half a century of teamwork with preeminent surgeons. She died two years after retirement, on May 28, 1943, and was buried in her hometown of Clyman, Wisconsin.

== Bibliography ==
- Eger, Edmond I.; Saidman, Lawrence J.; Westhorpe, Rod N. (2013). The Wondrous Story of Anesthesia. Springer Science & Business Media. ISBN 978-1-4614-8441-7.
- Keeling, Arlene Wynbeek (2007). "Practicing Medicine without a License? Nurse Anesthetists, 1900–1938". Nursing and the Privilege of Prescription, 1893-2000. Columbus: The Ohio State University. ISBN 9780814272275.
- Kubilius, Ramune (2020). "Galter Health Sciences Library & Learning Center | News Women's History Month: Isabella C. Herb, MD". galter.northwestern.edu. Northwestern University.
- Scheinman, Sarah; Wheaton, Nathalie (20 June 2011). "Isabella Herb, First Woman on the Medical Staff". Rush InPerson. Rush University Medical Center.
- Strickland, Robert A. (March 1995). "Isabella Coler Herb, MD: An Early Leader in Anesthesiology". Anesthesia & Analgesia. 80 (3): 600–605. doi:10.1097/00000539-199503000-00029. ISSN 0003-2999. PMID 7864432. S2CID 13025708.
- "News Women's History Month: Isabella C. Herb, MD". Galter Health Sciences Library & Learning Center. Northwestern University.
