= Anna Dormitzer =

American suffragette (1830–1903)

- Born: May 5, 1830; Prague
- Died: May 2, 1903 (aged 72); New York City
- Burial place: Green-Wood Cemetery in Brooklyn, New York
- Occupation(s): Inventor, Suffragette
- Spouse: Henry Dormitzer

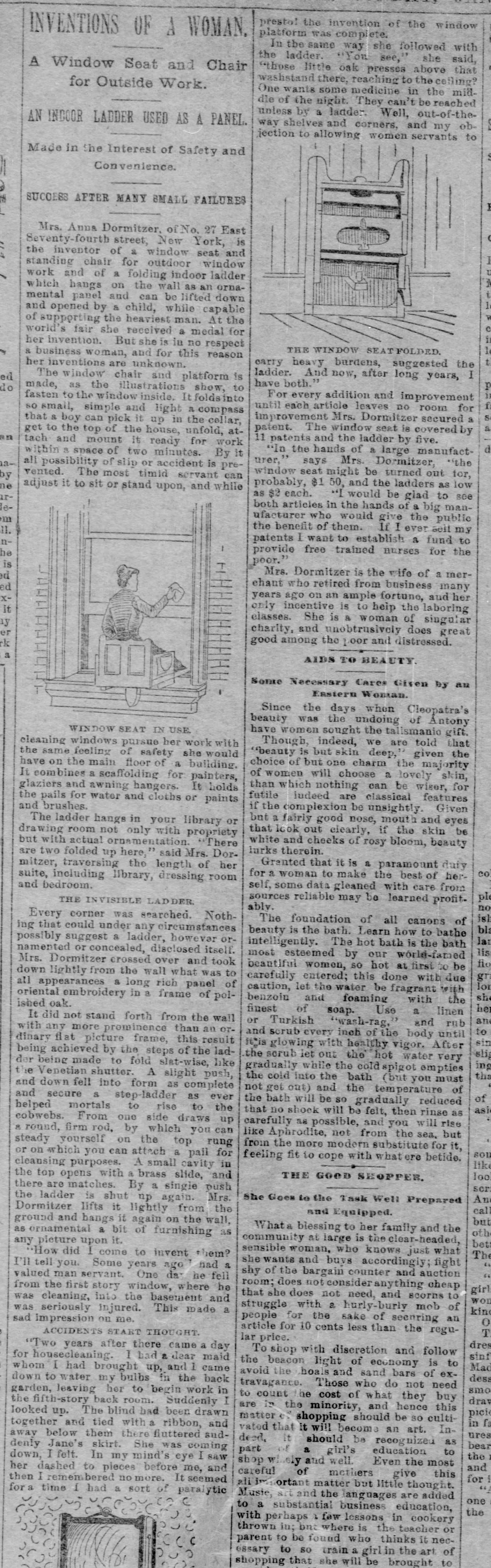
Pittsburgh Daily Post article (14 Jan 1894) describing window cleaning seat

Anna Dormitzer (née Essroger; 1830–1903) was an inventor, mother to seven children and a member of the National American Woman Suffrage Association. She received sixteen patents in her lifetime making her part of fifteen percent of women inventors to receive multiple patents.

== Early life ==
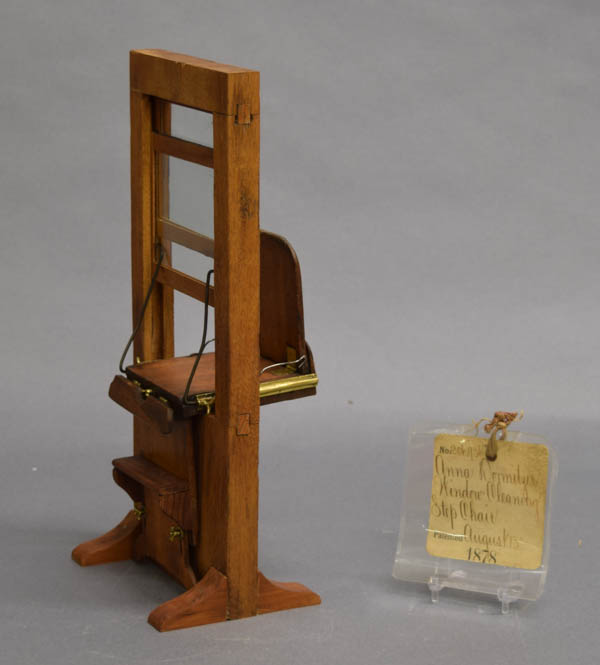
Patent Model - Window-Cleaning Step-Chairs, 1878, Patent No. US206936

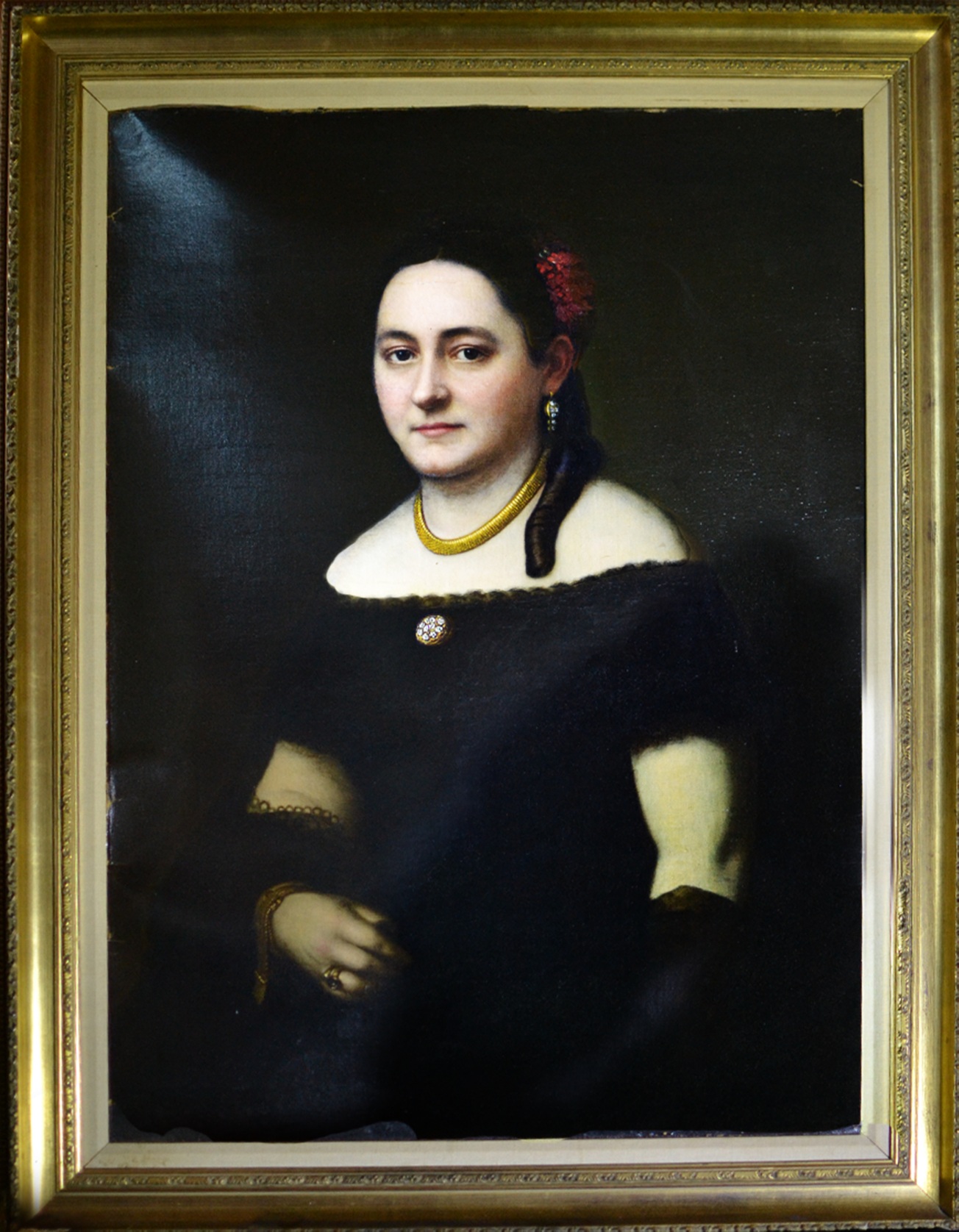
Portrait of Anna Dormitzer as a young woman, mid 1800s.

Dormitzer was born in Prague, Czech Republic on May 5, 1830. She immigrated to the United States arriving in New York at the age of 20 years in 1850. She married her husband, Henry Dormitzer the same year and they settled in Hoboken, New Jersey where Henry made his fortune in the tobacco business. After retiring the couple moved to New York City where they were both became active in politics. Dormitzer was a suffragette, a member of the National-American Woman Suffrage Association and the Sorosis Society.

== Professional career ==
While the Dormitzers were rich enough that they could afford to hire servants to do household tasks such as cleaning windows, Anna Dormitzer was sensitive to the precarious dangers of cleaning, particularly window-cleaning so much so that starting in 1878, she registered twelve patents for a variety of window washing devices. These included chairs and stepladders and a combination of both. Dormitzer included very precise and detailed drawings with her applications since all but her first application included a model.

- Window-Cleaning Step-Chair, Aug. 13, 1878
- Window-Cleaning Chair, Sept. 2, 1878
- Window-Cleaning Chair, July 12, 1881
- Combined Window Cleaning Chair and Fire Escape, Apr. 18, 1882
- Window Cleaning Chair, Feb. 12, 1884
- Window Cleaning Chair, June 9, 1885
- Window Cleaning Chair, Feb. 2, 1886
- Ornamental Step Ladder, Feb. 16, 1886
- Paint and Brush Bucket, May 25, 1886
- Safety Watch Pocket, Mar. 27, 1888
- Step Ladder, Feb. 25, 1890
- Step Ladder, Apr. 7, 1891
- Ornamental Step Ladder, Jan. 3, 1893
- Chair for Washing Windows, May 30, 1893
- Napkin Holder, Sept. 24, 1895
- Napkin Holder, May 5, 1896

== Death and legacy ==
Anna Dormitzer died on May 2, 1903, in New York City. Her husband Henry died several years later in 1911 and they are both buried in Green-Wood Cemetery in Brooklyn, New York.

== Collections ==
- Patent Model - Window-Cleaning Step-Chairs, 1878, Patent no. 206,936, Hagley Museum and Library, Wilmington, DE
