= Maria Romell =

Swedish inventor

Lovisa Maria Lorentina Romell
- Born: Lovisa Maria Lorentina Stenquist; 13 June 1859; Hangvar, Sweden
- Died: 3 July 1949; Västerhaninge, Sweden
- Occupation(s): Inventor, businesswoman
- Known for: Romell's Patent Office

Lovisa Maria Lorentina Romell (1859–1949) was a Swedish inventor and founder of Romell's Patent Office in Stockholm. She was also the creator of several inventions, including a heat-insulated food container, a skin salve, a travel case for sewing items and a perforated insert for collecting kitchen rubbish.

== Life and work ==
She was born Lovisa Maria Lorentina Stenquist on 13 June 1859 in Hangvar and grew up on Gotland island the daughter of the farmer Pehr August Pettersson and Maria Magdalena Wirelius and foster daughter to the board farm worker Mathias Wilhelm and Fredrika Carolina Isberg. Later she moved to Stockholm where she got a job at the patent agency Zacco and Bruun. When she found she had extra work to do at the office, she started her own business and called it Romell's Patent Office. This was a very remarkable enterprise for the time.

She married Lars Romell (1854–1927) in 1889, the same year she had established her business. When her husband had to leave his teaching job in a dispute over curricula, he started working as an employee and patent attorney in her office, which the couple continued to develop. In the office, they hired young boys as helpers, who worked for room and board or for a small wage. The office owners also promised tuition and access to the office library, which held 5,000 titles in ten languages. Among the helpers was the future writer Ivar Lo-Johansson who described his time there in a few of his books.

Eventually, Lars took over the patent office. Finally, Romell's Patent Office was sold to Maria Romell's old employer Zacco and Brunn.

Maria Romell died 3 July 1949 in Västerhaninge.
