= June Kroenke =

American inventor

June Eudora Kroenke (October 19, 1925 - November 11, 1993) of Hartland, Wisconsin, U.S., was the inventor of several patented sewing tools and founded June Tailor, Inc. in 1962.

Kroenke began sewing as a child and her frustration with pressing garments of various shapes led her to design a pressing board out of cardboard. She had the final design constructed out of wood and obtained a patent on her invention. Kroenke founded June Tailor in 1962 and began selling the pressing board and other pressing aids, first out of her basement, and then from a manufacturing facility in Richfield, Wisconsin. In 1976, her business had expanded to 24 products and the original pressing board, which had 12 different-shaped surfaces, remained the most popular item.

Kroenke's patented inventions include:

- Contour pressing forms (sold as "June Tailor Board", a type of pressing buck), patent number US 3165845, issued 1965
- Contour pressing boards, patent number US 3229393, issued 1966
- Contour pressing board, patent number CA 743806, issued 1966
- Universal pressing ham support, patent number US 4158265, issued 1979
- Cushioned needlework blocking board, patent number US 4335533, issued 1982
- Integrated cutting and pressing board including marking scale on the handle, patent number US 5386654, issued 1995
