= Edith Stern =

American inventor and mathematician

Edith Helen Stern
- Born: 1952 (age 73–74)
- Education: Florida Atlantic University; Michigan State University; Miami-Dade Junior College
- Scientific career
- Workplaces: IBM; Michigan State University

Edith Helen Stern (born 1952) is an American inventor and mathematician and former Vice President for Research and Development at IBM. She holds over 100 US patents and was awarded the ASME Kate Gleason Award. Stern was a child prodigy who was intensively educated by her father, having read the Encyclopædia Britannica at the age of 5 and was the youngest ever graduate of Florida Atlantic University at the age of 15.

== Early life and education ==
Stern's father, the scholar Aaron Stern, had been in concentration camps during World War II. He married Stern's mother, Bella, in a ghetto in Warsaw. Aaron Stern suffered from cancer and was treated at the Mayo Clinic because of a request from Albert Einstein. His experiences in the concentration camps led to his conviction that the world's evil was the result of stupidity and if people were smarter "they would be less likely to follow another Hitler". Upon the birth of Edith, Aaron Stern announced to reporters his ambitions to make her into a genius "and a perfect person".

Disabled by his time in the concentration camps and unable to work, Aaron devoted his time to intensively rearing his daughter, constantly speaking to her even as an infant. He encouraged his daughter to become an academic, in a technique he referred to as total education immersion. She used flashcards to communicate messages before she could talk, including expressing her age at 11 months old, had mastered the alphabet by the age of two, and played chess by the age of three. Aaron bought a set of the Encyclopaedia Britannica; Edith read them by the time she was four. (Adults who have claimed to have read most of Britannica include George Bernard Shaw who ignored the science articles). She was taken to museums and operas. She used a homemade abacus to learn mathematics, and was simultaneously taught ethics and compassion for people from different backgrounds. Despite her father not supporting IQ tests, Stern's IQ was said to be 205 at the age of 5. By the age of 6 Stern had read Plato, Freud and Darwin. Stern enrolled in college at the age of twelve, and earned a degree from Miami-Dade Junior College by the age of 15. She earned a bachelor's degree in mathematics at Florida Atlantic University in 1967, and was their youngest ever graduate. She was part of the Florida Atlantic University Chess Team. Stern went on to obtain a master's degree in mathematics at Michigan State University. Her father, who dubbed raising his daughter the Edith project, wrote a book about her upbringing, The Making of a Genius, which was published by Hurricane House Publishers in 1971. He gave a series of lectures at Stanford University about his ideas on education. The pressure of being in the public eye from an early age disrupted her family life.

== Career ==
Stern taught mathematics at Michigan State University before she turned twenty. She joined IBM as an intern in the early 1970s and was eventually promoted to Vice President for research and development. She worked on real-time computing for IBM, and is credited for creating direct dialing and last-call return. Stern worked on health informatics for IBM Watson. She was also involved with a team that won a Technology & Engineering Emmy Award for their work on digital commercials for the Warner Bros. Television network.

=== Awards and honors ===
Stern has over 120 US patents. Stern was the first woman to be made a full member of the American Society Of Mechanical Engineers (ASME). In 1998, Stern was named an IBM master inventor, and was elected to the IBM Academy of Technology in 1999. In 2012, Stern was awarded the AMSE Kate Gleason Award for her lifetime of developing new technologies. She was awarded the Florida Atlantic University Talon Award in 2013.

In 2015, Stern was listed by Business Insider as one of the Smartest People of All Time.
