= Jane A. McKeating =

British virologist

Professor Jane A. McKeating
- Education: University of Warwick; University College London
- Known for: Deputy Head of School of Immunity and Infection (University of Birmingham)
- Scientific career
- Fields: Molecular virology, Microbiology
- Workplaces: University of Birmingham
- Website: www.birmingham.ac.uk/staff/profiles/iandi/mckeating-jane.aspx

Jane A. McKeating is a professor of molecular biology at Oxford University, and honorary professor at the University of Birmingham, England, where she worked as a professor of molecular virology until 2017. She is listed as a notable scientist in Thomson Reuters' Highly Cited Researchers 2014, ranking her among the top 1% most cited scientists.

== Education ==
McKeating obtained a Bachelor of Science degree (BSc, Hons) from the University of Warwick in 1982 and a Doctorate from University College London in 1987.

== Career ==
McKeating was a fellow of the Lister Institute of Preventive Medicine from 1994 to 1999.

In 2005, McKeating became professor of molecular virology and deputy head of the School of Immunity and Infection at the University of Birmingham, where she established the school's HCV group which is involved in various national and international collaborative studies.

In 2017, she was appointed as professor of molecular biology at Oxford University, and continues as an honorary professor of the University of Birmingham. In 2019 she became an official fellow of Parks College.

McKeating is a member of the scientific advisory boards for the University of Essen, Astex Pharmaceuticals, and Arrow Pharmaceuticals.

She was elected a Fellow of the Academy of Medical Sciences in 2024.

== Research areas ==
McKeating's research focuses on the molecular biology of hepatitis B (HBV) and hepatitis C (HCV), particularly the role of cell surface receptors in the viral life cycle and the role of hypoxia in viral infection.

== Selected publications ==
- 2012 – In silico directed mutagenesis identifies the CD81/claudin-1 hepatitis C virus receptor interface. Davis C, Harris HJ, Hu K, Drummer HE, McKeating JA, Mullins JG, Balfe P. Cellular microbiology 14: 1892–903 Link
- 2012 – Hepatitis C virus and the brain. Fletcher NF, McKeating JA. Journal of viral hepatitis 19: 301–6 Link
- 2012 – Over the fence or through the gate: how viruses infect polarised cells. Fletcher NF, Howard C, McKeating JA. Immunotherapy 4: 249–51 Link
- 2012 – Hepatitis C virus entry: beyond receptors. Meredith LW, Wilson GK, Fletcher NF, McKeating JA. Reviews in medical virology 2012 22: 182–93 Link
- 2013 – Paracrine signals from liver sinusoidal endothelium regulate hepatitis C virus replication. Rowe IA, Galsinh SK, Wilson GK, Parker R, Durant S, Lazar C, Branza-Nichita N, Bicknell R, Adams DH, Balfe P, McKeating JA. Hepatology Link
- 2013 – An alpaca nanobody inhibits hepatitis C virus entry and cell-to-cell transmission. Tarr AW, Lafaye P, Meredith L, Damier-Piolle L, Urbanowicz RA, Meola A, Jestin JL, Brown RJ, McKeating JA, Rey FA, Ball JK, Krey T. Hepatology Link
- 2013 – HRas signal transduction promotes hepatitis C virus cell entry by triggering assembly of the host tetraspanin receptor complex. Zona L, Lupberger J, Sidahmed-Adrar N, Thumann C, Harris HJ, Barnes A, Florentin J, Tawar RG, Xiao F, Turek M, Durand SC, Duong FH, Heim MH, Cosset FL, Hirsch I, Samuel D, Brino L, Zeisel MB, Le Naour F, McKeating JA, Baumert TF. Cell host & microbe 13: 302–13 Link
- 2013 – A bile acid transporter as a candidate receptor for hepatitis B and D virus entry. Xiao F, McKeating JA, Baumert TF. Journal of Hepatology 58: 1246–8 Link
- 2013 – Early infection events highlight the limited transmissibility of hepatitis C virus in vitro. Meredith LW, Harris HJ, Wilson GK, Fletcher NF, Balfe P, McKeating JA. Journal of Hepatology 58: 1074–80 Link
- 2013 – Hepatoma polarisation limits CD81 and hepatitis C virus dynamics. Harris HJ, Clerte C, Farquhar MJ, Goodall M, Hu K, Rassam P, Dosset P, Wilson GK, Balfe P, Ijzendoorn SC, Milhiet PE, McKeating JA. Cellular microbiology 15: 430–45 Link
- 2013 – Heterogeneous claudin-1 expression in human liver. Harris HJ, Wilson GK, Hübscher SG, McKeating JA. Hepatology 57: 854–5 Link
- 2014 – Hypoxia inducible factors in liver disease and hepatocellular carcinoma: current understanding and future directions. Wilson GK, Tennant DA, McKeating JA. Journal of Hepatology 61:1397-406. Link
