= Sarah Boone =

American inventor (1832–1904)

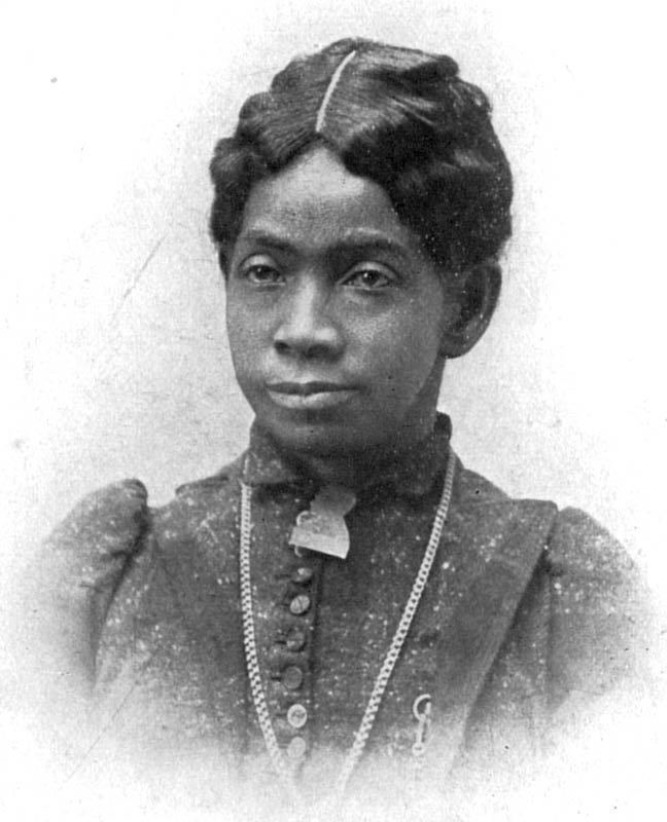
- Born: Sarah Marshall c. 1832; Craven County, North Carolina, US
- Died: 1904 (aged 71–72); New Haven, Connecticut, US
- Other name: Boon
- Occupations: Inventor; dressmaker
- Known for: Inventor of an ironing board improvement
- Spouse: James Boone (m. 1847)
- Children: 8

Sarah Boone (née Sarah Marshall; c. 1832 – 1904) was an African-American inventor.

== Invention ==
On April 26, 1892, Boone was granted United States patent number 473,653 for her improvements to the ironing board. Boone's ironing board was designed to improve the quality of ironing the sleeves and bodies of women's garments. The ironing board was very narrow, curved, and made of wood. The shape and structure allowed it to fit a sleeve and it was reversible, so one could iron both sides of the sleeve.

Boone is regarded (Note: Patents in this era record neither gender nor race of the patentee (with the sole exception of Henry Blair). However there is significant interest in both early women patent holders, and early African-American patent holders.) as the second African-American woman to be granted a patent, after Judy Reed. Other early African-American woman inventors were Miriam Benjamin, Ellen Eglin, and Sarah E. Goode.

== Personal life ==
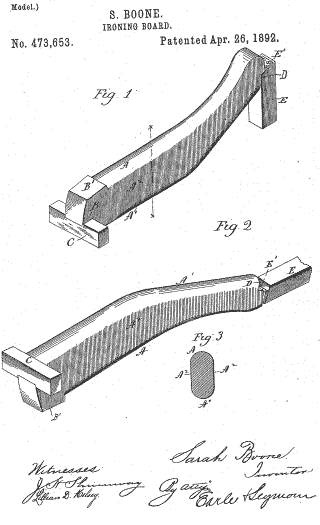
The patent drawing for the ironing board invented by Sarah Boone.

Sarah Marshall was born in Craven County, North Carolina, near the town of New Bern, in 1832. Along with her three siblings, she was born into slavery and hence barred from formal education. Sarah was educated by her grandfather at home. On November 25, 1847, she married James Boone (or Boon)—a free black man—in New Bern and was granted her freedom. They had eight children.

The Boone family left North Carolina for New Haven, Connecticut, before the outbreak of the American Civil War. They settled into a house at 30 Winter Street. Boone worked as a dressmaker and belonged to the Dixwell Avenue Congregational Church.

== Death ==
Boone died in 1904, and is buried in a family plot in Evergreen Cemetery in New Haven.

== See also ==
- Judy W. Reed
- List of African-American inventors and scientists
- Timeline of United States inventions
