= Ironing =

Process of removing wrinkles from fabric

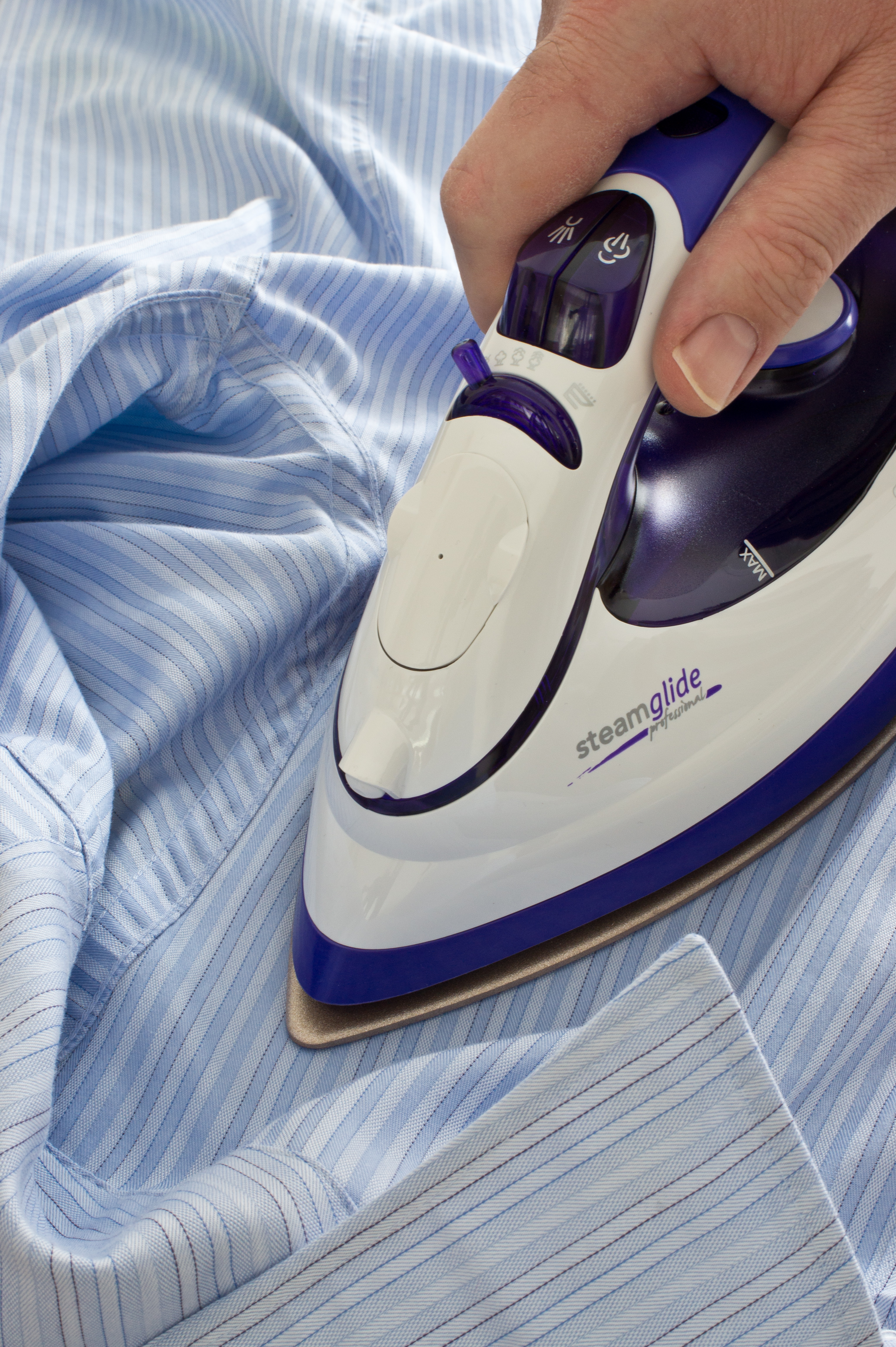
Ironing a shirt

Ironing is the use of an iron, usually heated, to remove wrinkles and unwanted creases from fabric. The heating is commonly done to a temperature of 180–220 °C (360–430 °F), depending on the fabric. Ironing works by loosening the bonds between the long-chain polymer molecules in the fibres of the material. While the molecules are hot, the fibres are straightened by the weight of the iron, and they hold their new shape as they cool. Some fabrics, such as cotton, require the addition of water to loosen the intermolecular bonds. Many modern fabrics (developed in or after the mid-twentieth century) are advertised as needing little or no ironing. Permanent press clothing was developed to reduce the ironing necessary by combining wrinkle-resistant polyester with cotton.

The first known use of heated metal to "iron" clothes is known to have occurred in China. The electric iron was invented in 1882, by Henry W. Seely. Seely patented his "electric flatiron" on June 6, 1882 (U.S. Patent no. 259,054).

== Equipment ==
=== Iron ===
The iron is the small appliance used to remove wrinkles from fabric. It is also known as a clothes iron, steam iron, flat iron, smoothing iron or iron box.

On 15 February 1858 W. Vandenburg and J. Harvey patented an ironing table that facilitated pressing sleeves and pant legs. A truly portable folding ironing board was first patented in Canada in 1875 by John B. Porter. The invention also included a removable press board used for sleeves. In 1892 Sarah Boone obtained a patent in the United States for improvements to the ironing board, allowing for better quality ironing for shirt sleeves.

=== Tailor's ham ===
A tailor's ham or dressmaker's ham is a tightly stuffed pillow in the shape of a ham used as a mold when pressing curves such as sleeves or collars.

=== Commercial equipment ===
Commercial dry cleaning and full-service laundry providers usually use a large appliance called a steam press to do most of the work of ironing clothes. Alternatively, a rotary iron may be used.

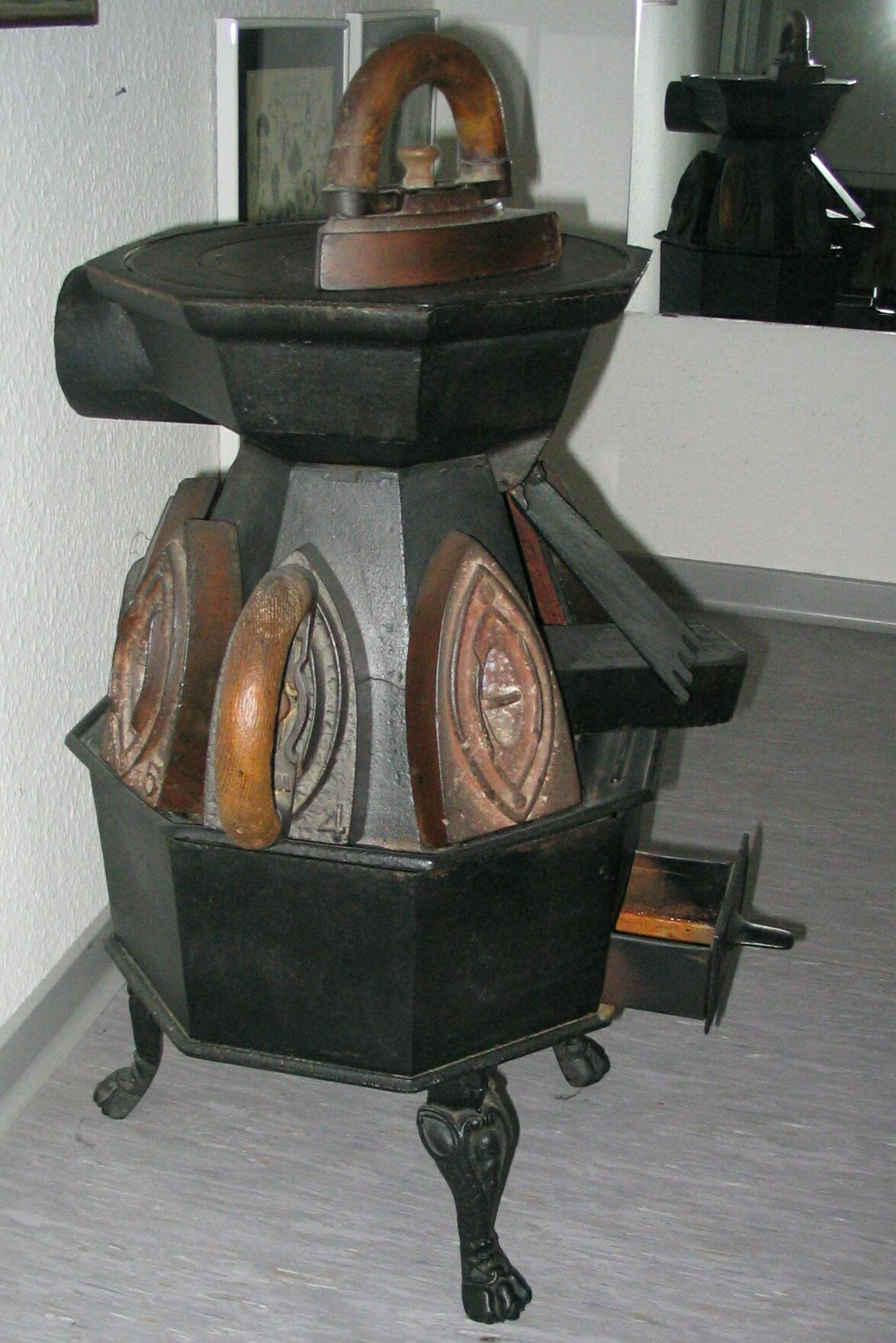
A tailor's stove

Historically, larger tailors' shops included a tailor's stove, used to quickly and efficiently heat multiple irons. In many developing countries a cluster of solid irons, heated alternatively from a single heating source, are used for pressing clothes at small commercial outlets.

== Chemistry ==
When the fabric is heated, the molecules are more easily reoriented. In the case of cotton fibres, which are derivatives of cellulose, the hydroxyl groups that crosslink the cellulose polymer chains are reformed at high temperatures and become somewhat "locked in place" upon cooling the item. In permanent press pressed clothes, chemical agents such as dimethylol ethylene urea are added as crosslinking agents.

== See also ==
- Domestic robot
- Extreme ironing
- Hair iron
- Laundry symbol
- Mangle (machine)
- Self-service laundry
- Washing machine
