= Miriam Benjamin =

American inventor (1861–1947)

Miriam E. Benjamin
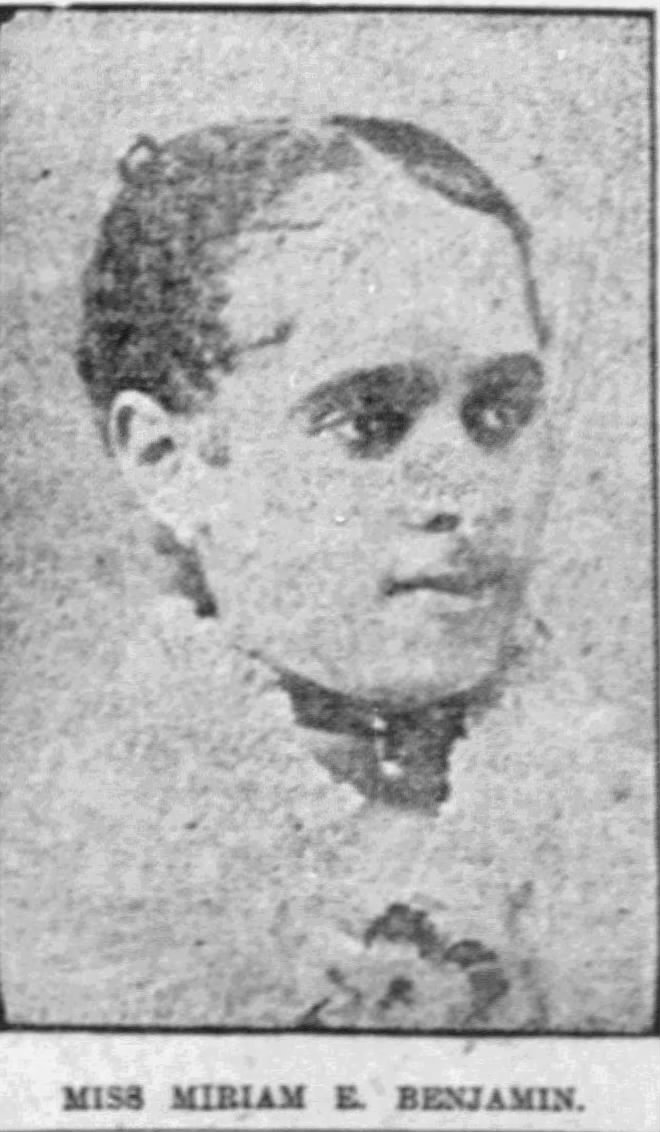
- Benjamin in 1906
- Born: Miriam Elizabeth Benjamin; September 16, 1861; Charleston, South Carolina, U.S.
- Died: 1947 (aged 85–86); Boston, Massachusetts, U.S.
- Other name: E. B. Miriam
- Occupations: Inventor; Educator
- Known for: Inventor of the Gong and Signal Chair and second black woman to receive a patent in the United States

Miriam Elizabeth Benjamin (September 16, 1861 – 1947) was an American schoolteacher and inventor. In 1888, she obtained a patent for the Gong and Signal Chair for Hotels, becoming the second African-American woman to receive a patent.

== Early life and education ==
Miriam Benjamin was born in Charleston, South Carolina in 1861.

In 1873, the Benjamin family moved to Boston, Massachusetts, where she attended the Girl's High School and graduated in 1881. After graduating, she accepted the position to become the Second Assistant at the Stanton Institute, Jacksonville, Florida. Benjamin was appointed by the Superintendent of Education for the County of Duval.

While working as an educator, Benjamin attended Howard University's medical school between 1894 and 1895. After passing a competitive civil service examination and working as a government clerk in a number of federal departments, she obtained legal training, possibly by reading law under the instruction of an attorney, or by attending law school, and became an attorney.

== Career ==
From 1888 to 1895, Benjamin was a teacher in Washington, D.C., in the segregated municipal school system. In 1888, she was living at 1736 New York Avenue, N.W. in Washington.

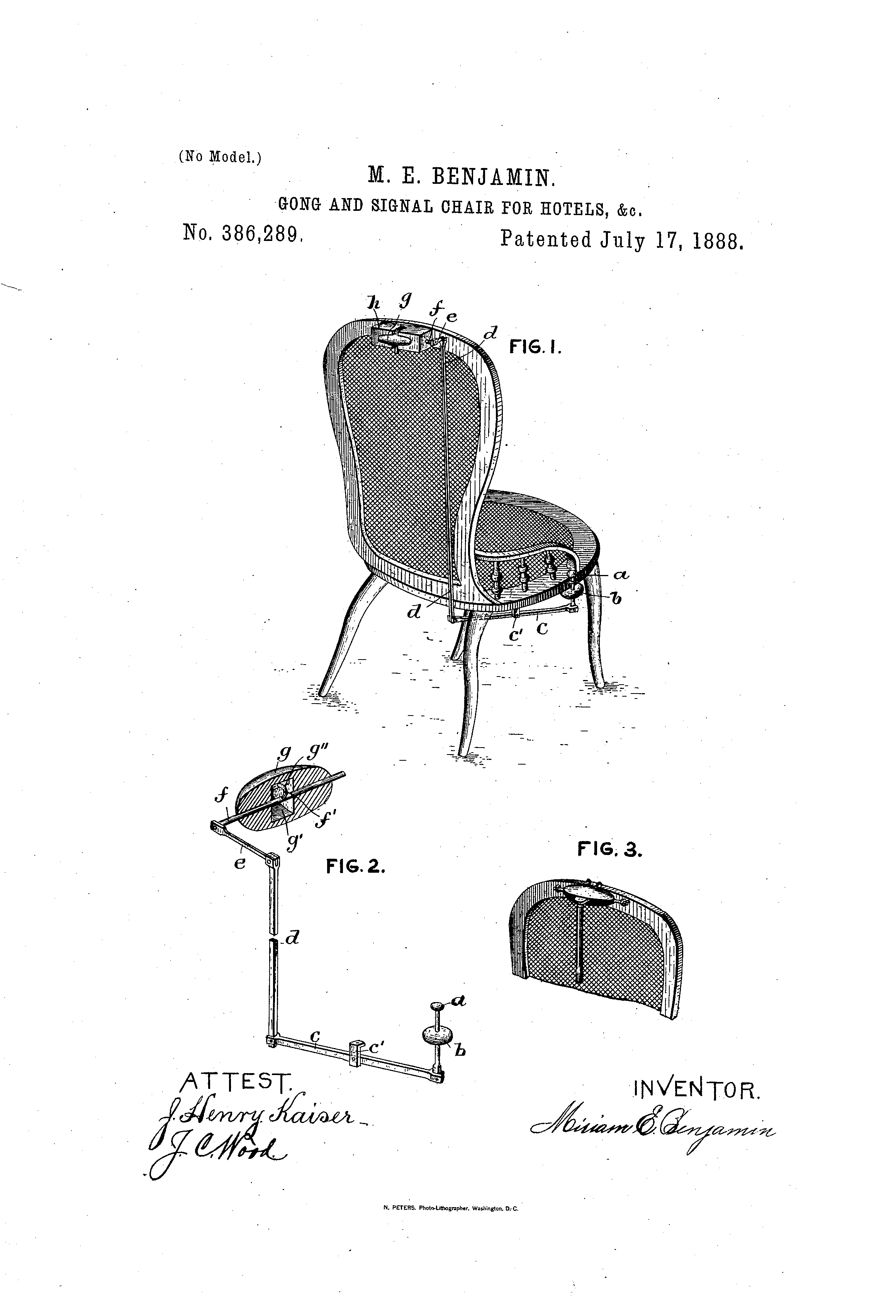
The patent used by Benjamin for the Gong and Signal Chair for Hotels.

On July 17, 1888, she obtained a patent for her invention, the Gong and Signal Chair for Hotels. As its name suggests, the chair had both a gong and signal connected to it. When the person in the chair pressed a small button on the side of the chair, it would ring a bell and display the red side of a ball on the back of the chair, allowing the attendant to see which guest needed help. The chair was designed to reduce expenses by reducing the need for waiters and attendants, and "to obviate the necessity of hand clapping or calling aloud" to obtain assistance. Benjamin claimed that as many as half or a third of attendants would be needed, as well as the atmosphere changing to quiet and comfort for the patrons (which greatly promoted the chair in hotels).

As described in the patent application, Benjamin also intended the invention to be useful for legislatures, and she further hoped this would include the United States House of Representatives, and lobbied for it to be adopted. A similar but more complicated system was installed in 1895 by the United States House of Representatives. Her invention was also a precursor to the signaling system used on airplanes for passengers to seek assistance from flight attendants.

Also in 1895, William A. Hemphill, former mayor of Atlanta, Georgia and at the time, business manager of the Atlanta Constitution, organized the Cotton States and International Exposition, described as an attempt to promote the American South to the world and showcase products and new technologies, as well as to encourage trade with Latin America. The Cotton States and International Exposition featured exhibits from several states including various innovations in agriculture and technology and industry. African-Americans were prominently featured as part of the Exposition, with Booker T. Washington of Tuskegee Institute delivering his keynote speech on September 18, 1895 known as the Atlanta Compromise that attempted to promote racial cooperation, and was called "one of the most important and influential speeches in American history." The "Negro Building" contained exhibits from various educational institutions such as Tuskegee and Hampton Institute as well as a number of models of inventions from African Americans, courtesy of the Patent Office. Among the models were Benjamin's Gong and Signal chair. It appears that she may have been trying to promote its use in private life, as it was described as being used "by a patient in a hospital, or one waiting in a railway station [who] can call an attendant from an adjacent room without making any noise. The inventor claims that but half or a third as many attendants will be needed and the quiet and comfort of patients and guests will greatly promoted."

After the 1888 patent of the Gong and Signal chair, Benjamin continued to obtain patents. When she returned to Boston in 1900, she referred to herself as a "solicitor of patents," and is listed as an attorney on her brother's 1893 patent application. In 1903, it was reported she patented a pinking device for dressmaking. On December 4, 1917, she received U.S. patent no. 1,249,000 for her Sole for Footwear. This invention was intended to help with temperature regulation in the foot.

Under the pseudonym E. B. Miriam, Benjamin also composed musical pieces, including songs and marches for piano and band. In 1895, the Boston-based magazine Women's Era reported "Miss Miriam Benjamin has composed a march which is now upon the market, the 'Boston Elite Quickstep.' It has been played by Sousa's band, and is published by Ross of West street, this city. The publisher is so well pleased with it that he offers to take any future work of Miss Benjamin. By the way, the author is published as E. B. Miriam." One of her compositions was used by Theodore Roosevelt's presidential campaign in 1904.

In 1920, she returned to Boston, where she lived and worked with her brother, attorney Edgar P. Benjamin. Along with Sarah Boone, Ellen Eglin, and Sarah E. Goode, Benjamin was one of four African American women inventors of her time who developed new technology for the home.

== Personal life ==
Her sisters were Charlotte D. "Lottie" Benjamin (1863–1928, m. Walter W. Sampson, 1889, no children) and Eva S. Benjamin (1867–73). Her brother Lyde Wilson Benjamin (1865–1916) was an attorney as well as an inventor. On May 16, 1893, he received U.S. patent no. 497,747 for an improvement on "Broom Moisteners and Bridles." Her younger brother Edgar Pinkerton Benjamin (1869–1972) graduated from Boston University's law school and had a successful private practice in the city of Boston. Although best remembered for establishing the Resthaven Nursing Home (now the Benjamin Healthcare Center) in Roxbury, Massachusetts, he also received U.S. patent no. 475,749 for a "Trousers-Shield," or, a bicycle clip, on May 31, 1892.

Miriam Benjamin never married. For most of her life she lived with her widowed mother Eliza Jane (Hopkins) Benjamin (1840–1934) in the Boston area. She died in 1947.

== See also ==
- List of African-American inventors and scientists
- Timeline of United States inventions
