= Sewing =

Craft of joining fabrics with a needle and thread

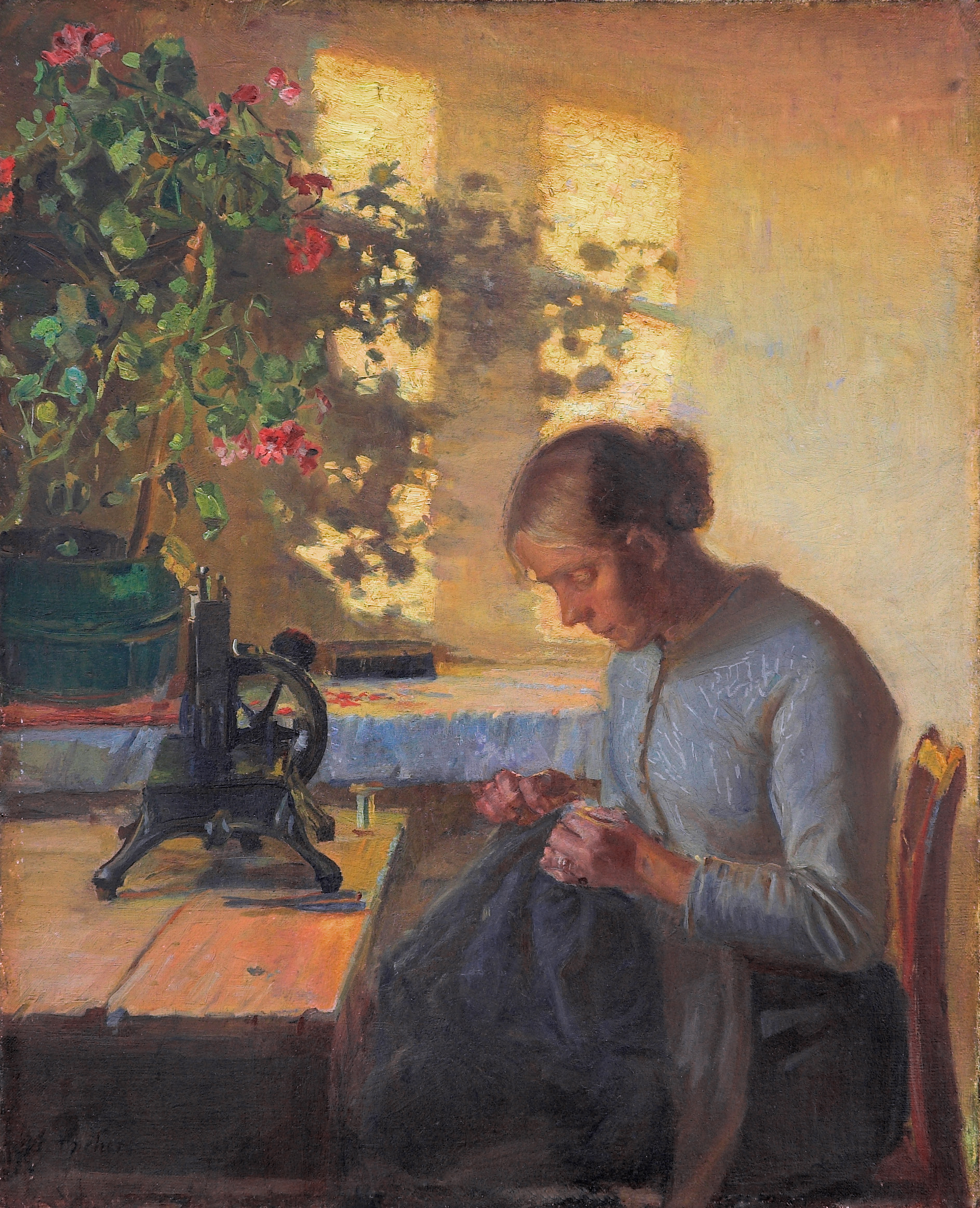
Sewing Fisherman's Wife by Anna Ancher, 1890

Sewing is the craft of fastening pieces of textiles together using a sewing needle and thread. Sewing is one of the oldest of the textile arts, originating in the Paleolithic era. Archaeological evidence suggests that early humans in Europe and Asia produced garments from fur and leather clothing using bone, antler or ivory sewing-needles and "thread" made of various animal body parts including sinew, catgut, and veins. Though early forms of garment creation have existed for centuries, the first known use of the word "sewing" to describe these practices appeared in the 14th century.

For thousands of years, all sewing was done by hand. The sewing machine which was invented in the 19th century enabled mechanized stitching, and the mass production of garments expanded in the 20th century. Hand sewing remains common in high-quality tailoring, haute couture fashion, and custom dressmaking, and is practiced by both textile artists and hobbyists as a means of creative expression.

== History ==
=== Origins ===
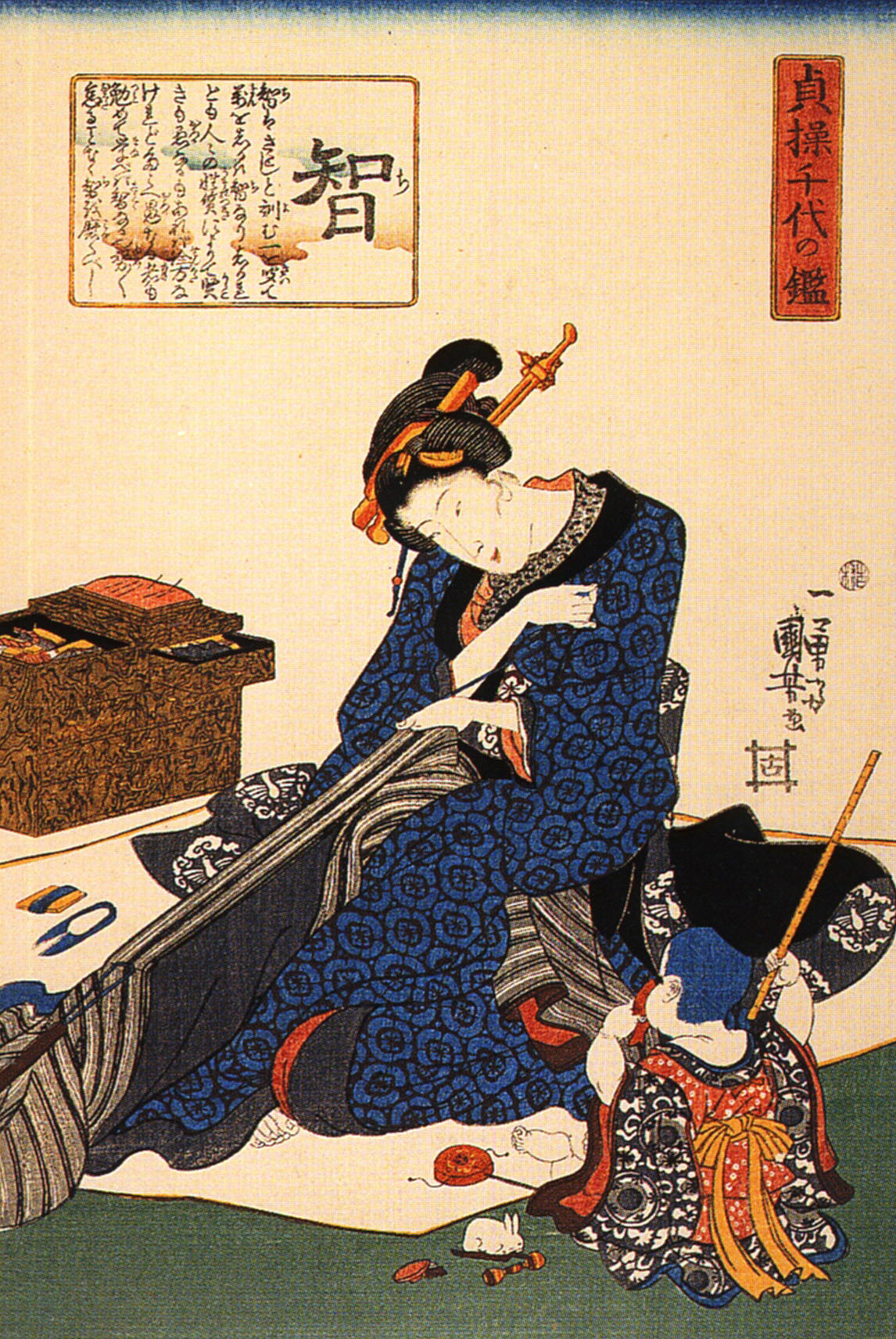
Seated woman sewing a kimono, Utagawa Kuniyoshi, in the early 19th century. Different cultures have developed diverse sewing techniques, from methods of cutting fabric to types of stitches.

Sewing has an ancient history estimated to begin during the Paleolithic Era. Sewing was used to stitch together animal hides for clothing and for shelter. The Inuit, for example, used sinew from caribou for thread and needles made of bone; the indigenous peoples of the American Plains and Canadian Prairies used sophisticated sewing methods to assemble tipi shelters. Sewing was combined with the weaving of plant leaves in Africa to create baskets, such as those made by Zulu weavers, who used thin strips of palm leaf as "thread" to stitch wider strips of palm leaf that had been woven into a coil. The weaving of cloth from natural fibers originated in the Middle East around 4000 BC, and perhaps earlier during the Neolithic Age, and the sewing of cloth accompanied this development.

During the Middle Ages, Europeans who could afford it employed seamstresses and tailors. The vital importance of sewing was indicated by the honorific position of "Lord Sewer" at many European coronations from the Middle Ages. An example was Robert Radcliffe, 1st Earl of Sussex who was appointed Lord Sewer at the coronation of Henry VIII of England in 1509.

Women mainly occupied these roles as sewing has been often classified as a household chore and traditional gender norms sought to confine women to the home. Most sewing before the 19th century was focused on repairing and maintaining clothing. Garments were often taken apart and reconstructed to extend their lifespan. Worn fabric was sometimes taken apart and made into quilts or other household textiles. This push for garment reconstruction and reuse challenges the notion of mended clothing as a poor or degraded style of dress and allows women's craft to have a longer legacy. Mending involved deconstructing garments and putting them back together to make clothing that would last longer. This work was not as glorified as men's repairs to society, as public audiences often had a negative reaction to the idea of restoring value to something broken.

Decorative needlework such as embroidery was a valued skill, and young women with the time and means would practice to build their skill in this area. From the Middle Ages to the 17th century, sewing tools such as needles, pins and pincushions were included in the trousseaus of many European brides. Sewing birds or sewing clamps were used as a third hand and were popular gifts for seamstresses in the 19th century.

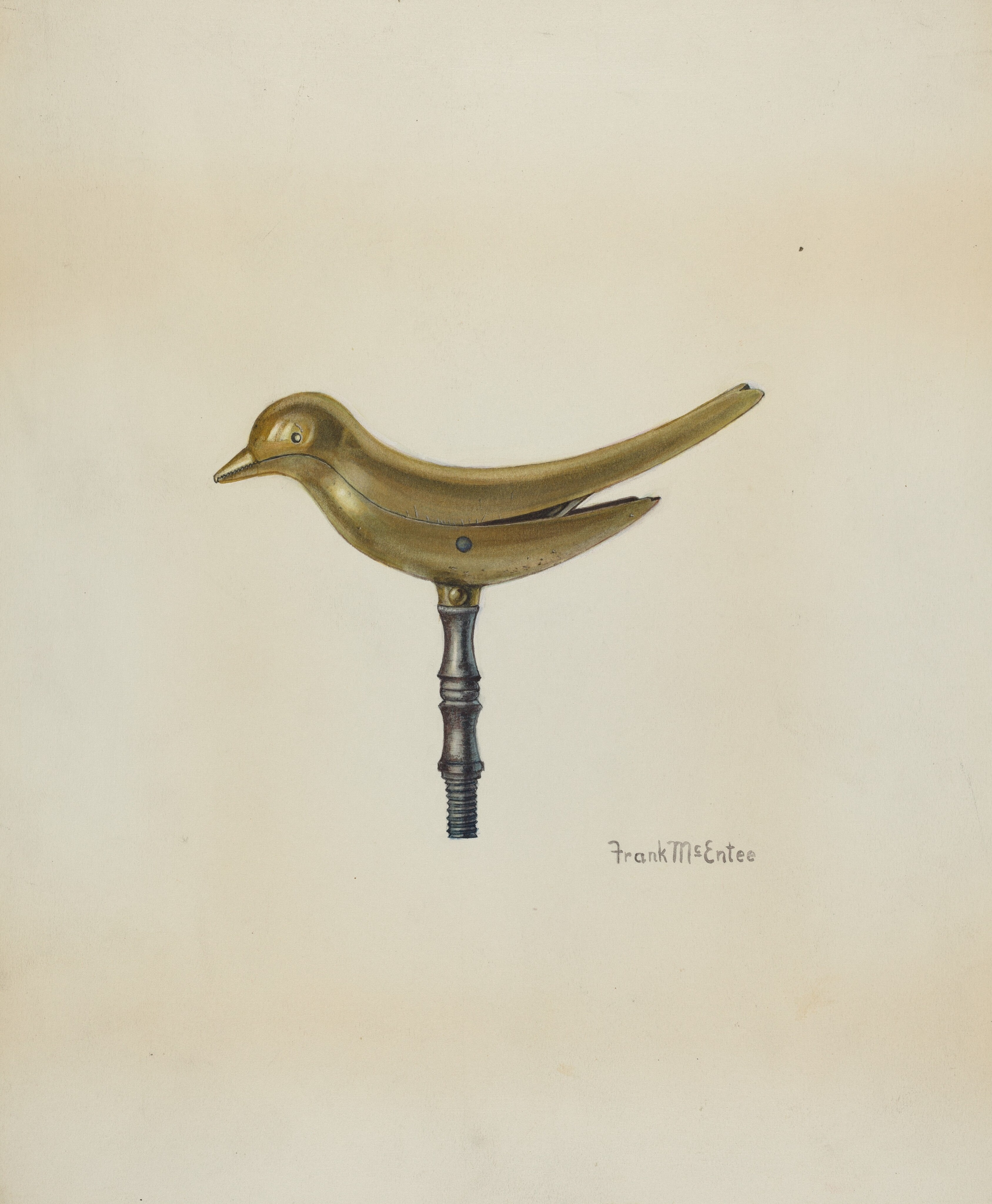
A sewing bird or sewing clamp provides a "third hand" to hold fabric taut. Watercolor by Frank McEntee, National Gallery of Art, Index of American Design.

Decorative embroidery was valued in many cultures worldwide. Although most embroidery stitches in the Western repertoire are traditionally British, Irish or Western European in origin, stitches originating in different cultures are known throughout the world today. Some examples are the Cretan Open Filling stitch, Romanian Couching or Oriental Couching, and the Japanese stitch. The stitches associated with embroidery spread by way of the trade routes that were active during the Middle Ages. The Silk Road brought Chinese embroidery techniques to Western Asia and Eastern Europe, while techniques originating in the Middle East spread to Southern and Western Europe through Morocco and Spain. European imperial settlements also spread embroidery and sewing techniques worldwide. However, there are instances of sewing techniques indigenous to cultures in distant locations from one another, where cross-cultural communication would have been historically unlikely. For example, a method of reverse appliqué known to areas of South America is also known to Southeast Asia.

=== Industrial Revolution ===
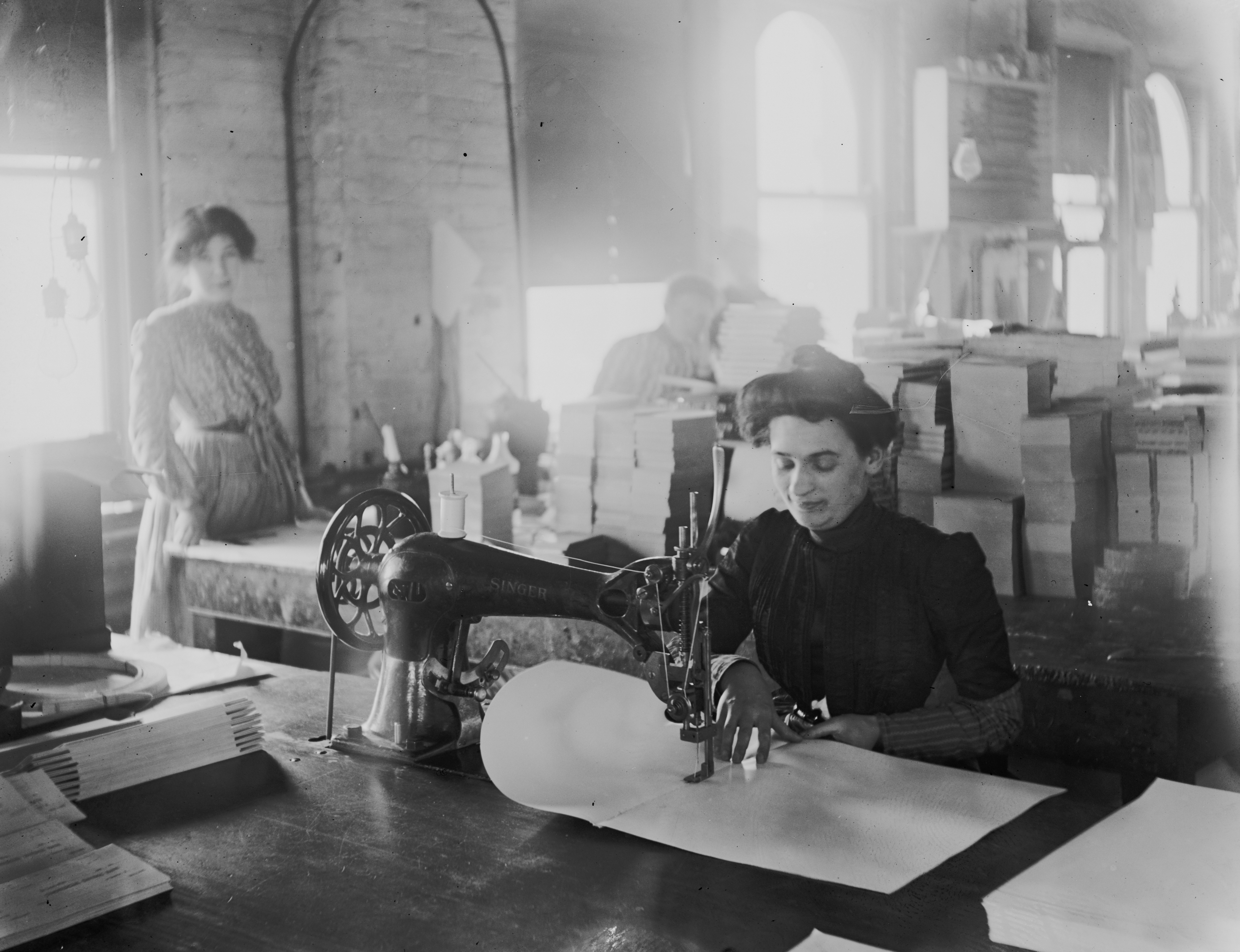
Early 20th century sewing in Detroit, Michigan

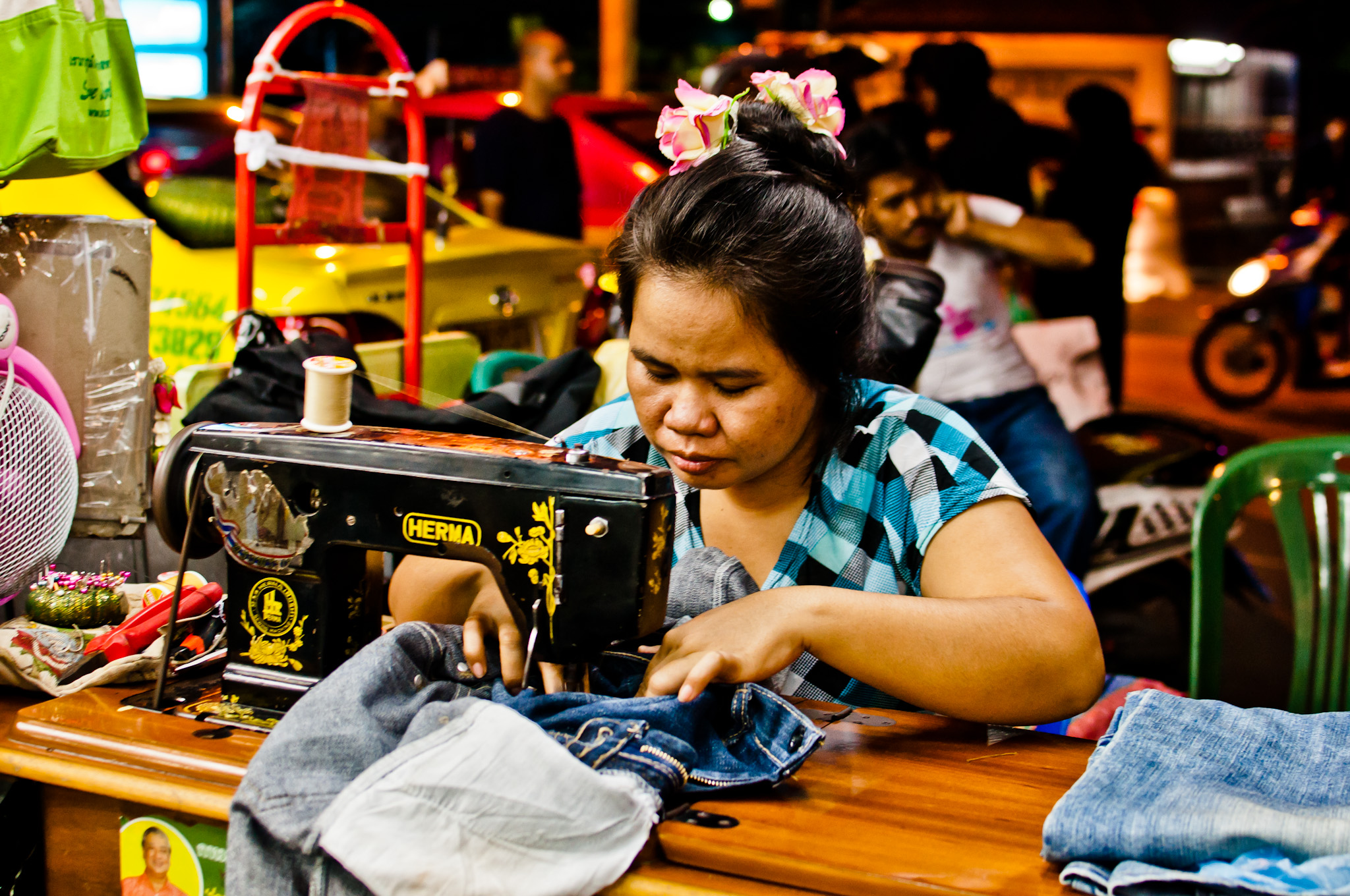
A woman sewing as a street vendor in Bangkok, Thailand.

Sewing with an 1894 Singer sewing machine.

The Industrial Revolution shifted the production of textiles from the household to the mills. In the early decades of the Industrial Revolution, the machinery produced whole cloth. The world's first sewing machine was patented in 1790 by Thomas Saint. By the early 1840s, other early sewing machines began to appear. Barthélemy Thimonnier introduced a simple sewing machine in 1841 to produce military uniforms for France's army; shortly afterward, a mob of tailors broke into Thimonnier's shop and threw the machines out of the windows, believing the machines would put them out of work. By the 1850s, Isaac Singer developed the first sewing machines that could operate quickly and accurately and surpass the productivity of a seamstress or tailor sewing by hand.

While much clothing was still produced at home by female members of the family, more and more ready-made clothes for the middle classes were being produced with sewing machines. Textile sweatshops full of poorly paid sewing machine operators grew into entire business districts in large cities like London and New York City. To further support the industry, piece work was done for little money by women living in slums. Needlework was one of the few occupations considered acceptable for women, but it did not pay a living wage. Women working from home often worked 14-hour days to earn enough to support themselves, sometimes by renting sewing machines that they could not afford to buy.

Tailors became associated with higher-end clothing during this period. In London, this status grew out of the dandy trend of the early 19th century, when new tailor shops were established around Savile Row. These shops acquired a reputation for sewing high-quality handmade clothing in the style of the latest British fashions, as well as more classic styles. The boutique culture of Carnaby Street was absorbed by Savile Row tailors during the late 20th century, ensuring the continued flourishing of Savile Row's businesses.

Historian Judith Bennett explains that the nature of women's work maintained a consistent pattern from the medieval period through the Second Industrial Revolution, characterized by tasks that were low-profit, low-volume, and low-skilled, often performed alongside other responsibilities. Similarly, Judy Lown argues that although women's work transitioned from the household to the factory, its essence—remaining low-skilled and poorly paid—persisted without significant change.

The transition to industrialization introduced a growing dependence on cash income in Northwestern Europe. For many working-class families, opportunities to earn wages were often located in distant cities, prompting many girls to leave their rural homes and migrate to urban areas. The changing nature of work in general raised questions about how women fit into rising industrialization and how both men and women should navigate gender roles. One of the concerns of the 19th century was the impact of industrialization on women's morality. According to Mariana Valverde, many male factory workers and union leaders alike argued that women working in industrial settings would be contrary to their nature and symbolized a "return to barbarism."

This perception not only reflected prevailing gender biases but also influenced labor policies and union strategies, which often sought to exclude women from better-paying industrial jobs. Such debates reinforced the belief that women were best suited for domestic roles or low-skilled work, limiting their economic opportunities and perpetuating a cycle of inequality.

=== 20th century onward ===
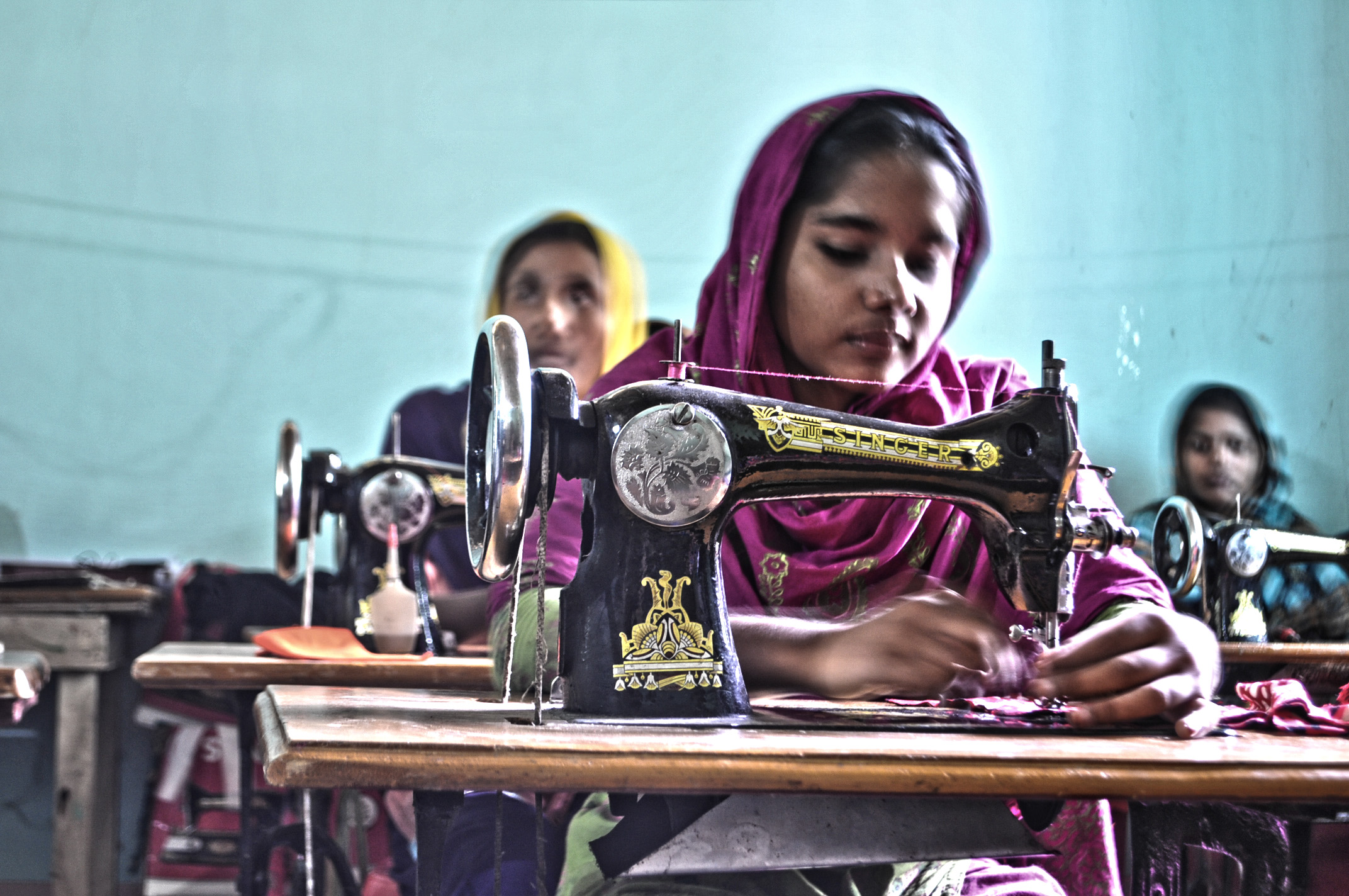
Bangladeshi women sewing clothes.

Sewing underwent further developments during the 20th century. As sewing machines became more affordable to the working class, demand for sewing patterns grew. Women had become accustomed to seeing the latest fashions in periodicals during the late 19th and early 20th centuries, increasing demand for sewing patterns yet more. American tailor and manufacturer Ebenezer Butterick met the demand with paper patterns that could be traced and used by home sewers. The patterns, sold in small packets, became wildly popular. Several pattern companies soon established themselves. Women's magazines also carried sewing patterns, and continued to do so for much of the 20th century. Women began to sew less in the home when they started using sewing as a way to make money, such as by selling their products and patterns to others and teaching sewing in schools to young girls. During the late 20th and early 21st centuries, scholars have noted that motivations for home sewing shifted significantly. Whereas sewing had long been associated with economic necessity, its decline coincided with major changes in fashion consumption, household labor, and gender expectations. Research suggests that attitudes toward sewing increasingly reflected broader social trends: sewing was sometimes perceived as old-fashioned or incompatible with modern lifestyles, while the intergenerational transmission of skills diminished. At the same time, sewing continued to hold symbolic meaning for many people, relating to identity, creativity, and personal agency in domestic life. In fact, today, many sewers, artists, and other types of entrepreneurs who are also passionate about social change called "craftivists" are taking advantage of the internet and social media to share or sell their work, often created in the home, in digital and public marketplaces. Sewing as a pleasurable hobby has gained popularity as attested by the BBC televisions show The Great British Sewing Bee, on air since 2013.

The spread of sewing machine technology to industrialized economies around the world meant the spread of Western-style sewing methods and clothing styles as well. In Japan, traditional clothing was sewn together with running stitch that could be removed so that the clothing could be taken apart and the assorted pieces laundered separately. The tight-locked stitches made by home sewing machines, and the use of Western clothing patterns, led to a movement towards wearing Western-style clothing during the early 20th century. Western sewing and clothing styles were disseminated in sub-Saharan Africa by Christian missionaries from the 1830s onward. Indigenous cultures, such as the Zulu and Tswana, were indoctrinated in the Western way of dress as a sign of conversion to Christianity. First Western hand sewing techniques, and later machine sewing, spread throughout the regions where the European colonists settled. However, a recent examination of new online learning methods demonstrated that technology can be adapted to share knowledge of a culture's traditional sewing methods. Using self-paced online tutorials, a Malay sewing class learned how to tailor and sew a traditional men's Baju Kurung garment in 3 days, whereas a traditional Malay sewing class would have taken 5 days to teach the same information.

Industrial technology innovations have brought significant changes to the textile industry, which was one of the first major craft work industries dominated by women. In particular, the sewing machine allowed beginner crafters to have the time and ability to make handmade clothing for sale to others, although it initially led to a decline in at home sewing. Women started putting their products out in craft fairs, retail stores, and female co-ops or craft collectives. Once the internet became available, the textile market expanded even more as women were not constrained by the necessity of having in-person store space and could market their creation online.

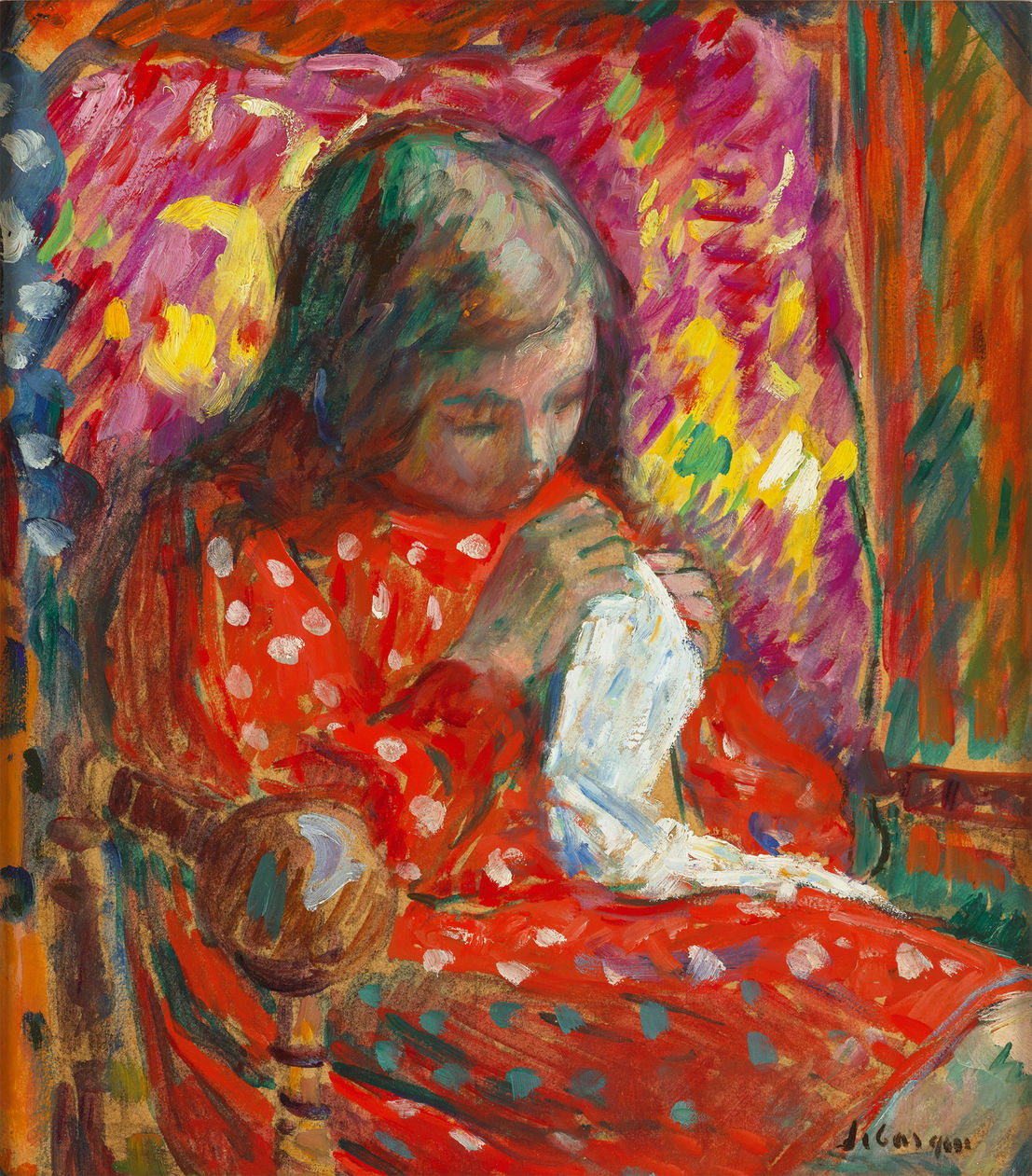
Henri Lebasque, Jeune fille cousant, c. 1925

The decline of home garment sewing in Western countries has been attributed to several interconnected factors. In addition to the widespread availability of inexpensive ready-made clothing, changes in household labor patterns reduced the time available for sewing, and sewing education in schools became less common. Commercial fashion cycles accelerated throughout the 1980s and 1990s, making store-bought garments more desirable to many consumers than handmade clothing. The reduced social visibility of home sewing also contributed to the decline, as fewer families passed down sewing skills from one generation to the next.

== Garment construction ==
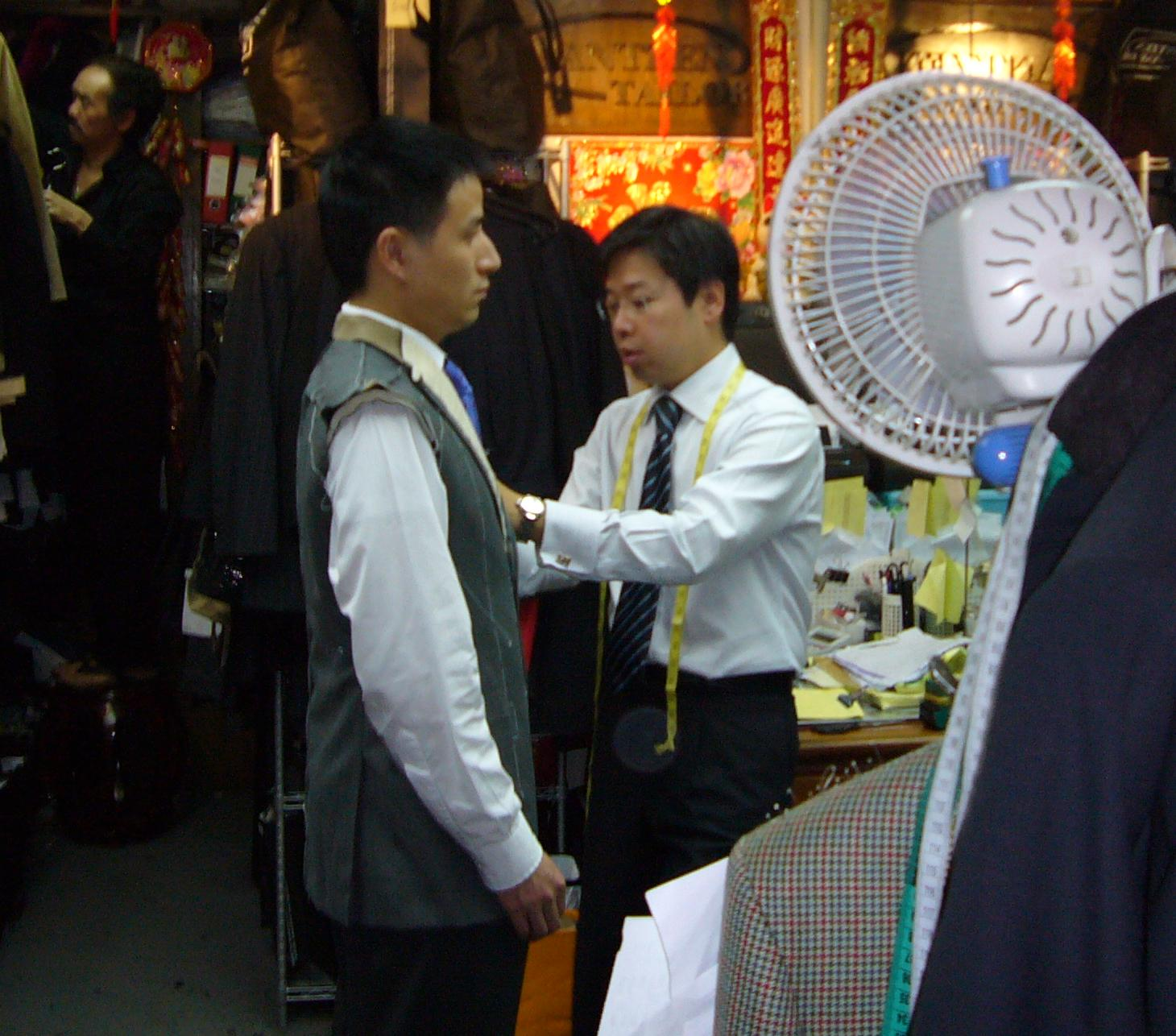
A tailor fitting a suit in Hong Kong.

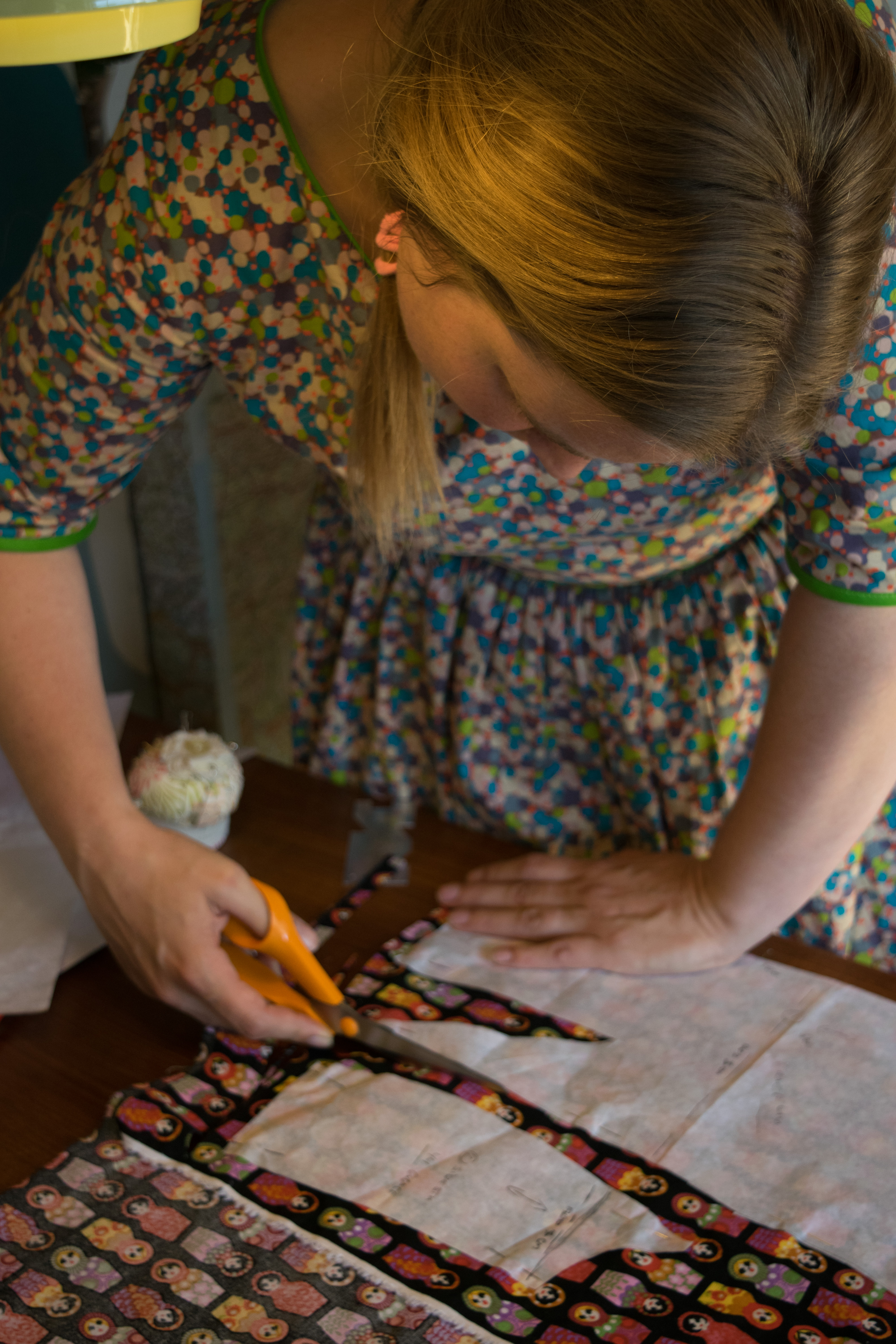
Hobby sewer cutting out fabric for a dress

=== Patterns and fitting ===
Garment construction is usually guided by a sewing pattern. A pattern can be quite simple; some patterns are nothing more than a mathematical formula that the sewer calculates based on the intended wearer's measurements. Once calculated, the sewer has the measurements needed to cut the cloth and sew the garment together. At the other end of the spectrum are haute couture fashion designs. When a couture garment is made of unusual material, or has extreme proportions, the design may challenge the sewer's engineering knowledge. Complex designs are drafted and refitted dozens of times, may take around 40 hours to develop a final pattern, and require 60 hours of cutting and sewing. It is important for a pattern to be created well because the way a completed piece fits is the reason it will either be worn or not.

Most clothing today is mass-produced, and conforms to standard sizing, based on body measurements that are intended to fit the greatest proportion of the population. However, while "standard" sizing is generally a useful guideline, it is little more than that, because there is no industry standard that is "both widely accepted and strictly adhered to in all markets".

Home sewers often work from sewing patterns purchased from companies such as Simplicity, Butterick, McCall's, Vogue, Burda, and many others. Such patterns are typically printed on large pieces of tissue paper; a sewer may simply cut out the required pattern pieces for use but may choose to transfer the pattern onto a thicker paper if repeated use is desired. A sewer may choose to alter a pattern to make it more accurately fit the intended wearer. Patterns may be changed to increase or decrease length; to add or remove fullness; to adjust the position of the waistline, shoulder line, or any other seam, or a variety of other adjustments. Volume can be added with elements such as pleats, or reduced with the use of darts. Before work is started on the final garment, test garments may be made, sometimes referred to as muslins or toiles.

=== Tools ===
Sewers working on a simple project need only a few sewing tools, such as flexible measuring tape, needle, thread, cloth, and sewing shears, but there are many helpful sewing aids and specialized tools available.

Rotary cutters may also be used for cutting fabric, usually used with a cutting mat to protect other surfaces from being damaged. Seam rippers are used to remove mistaken stitches or basting stitches. Special washable markers or chalk are used to mark the fabric as a guide to construction.

Pressing and ironing are an essential part of any sewing project, and require additional tools. A steam iron is used to press seams and garments, and a variety of pressing aids such as a seam roll or tailor's ham are used to aid in shaping a garment. A pressing cloth may be used to protect the fabric from damage. A velvet board helps to iron velvet without crushing it.

Sewing machines are now made for a broad range of specialised sewing purposes, such as quilting machines, heavy-duty machines for sewing thicker fabrics (such as leather), computerized machines for embroidery, and sergers for finishing raw edges of fabric.

A wide variety of presser foot attachments are available for many sewing machines—feet exist to help with hemming, pintucks, attaching cording, assembling patchwork, quilting, and a variety of other functions.

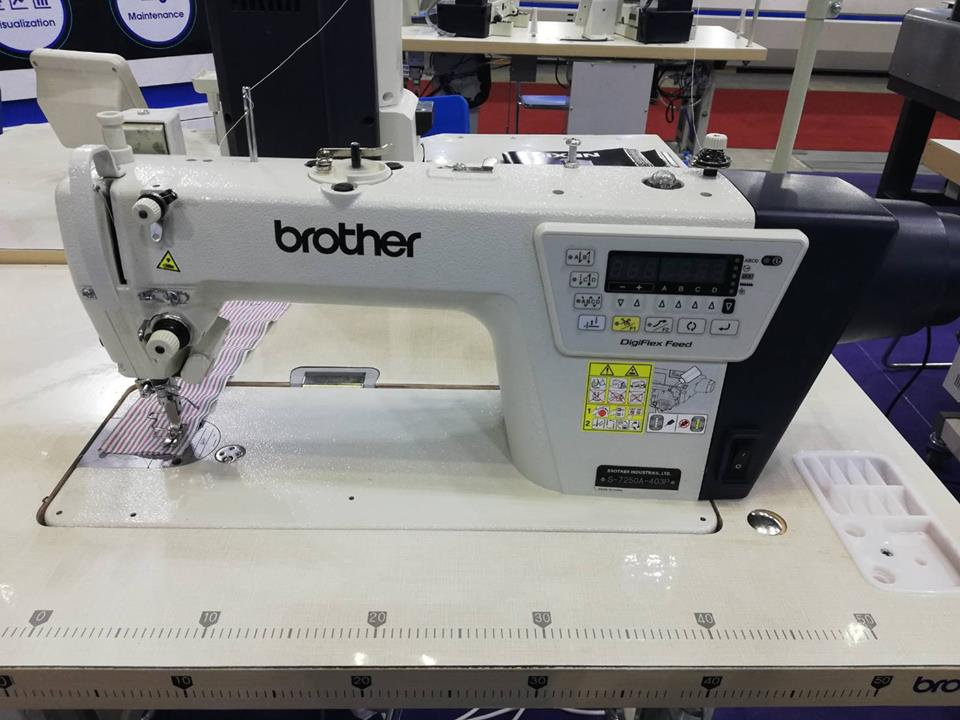
Latest sewing machines Brother "Nexio" Direct Drive Lock Stitcher with Electronic Feeding System

=== Elements ===
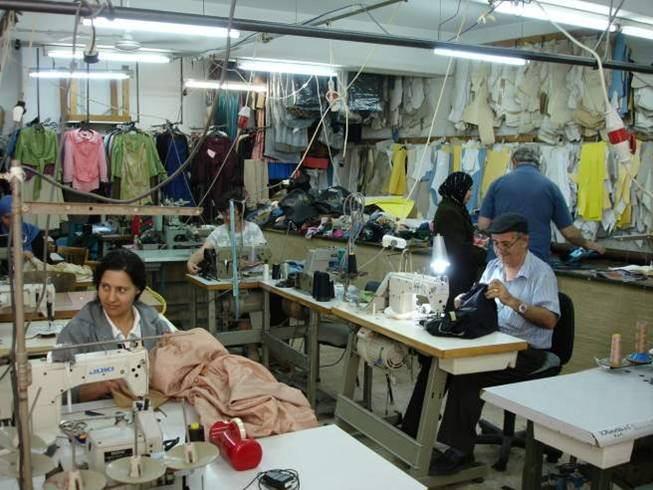
Garment construction

Seamstresses are provided with the pattern, while tailors would draft their own pattern, both with the intent of using as little fabric as possible. Patterns will specify whether to cut on the grain or the bias to manipulate fabric stretch. Special placement may be required for directional, striped, or plaid fabrics.

Before or after the pattern pieces are cut, it is often necessary to mark the pieces to provide a guide during the sewing process. Marking methods may include using pens, pencils, or chalk, tailor's tacks, snips, pins, or thread tracing, among others.

In addition to the normal lockstitch, construction stitches include edgestitching, understitching, staystitching and topstitching. Seam types include the plain seam, zigzag seam, flat fell seam, French seam and many others.

=== Software ===
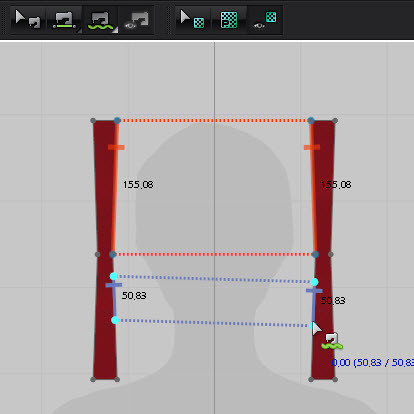
Virtual sewing machine tools in a cloth simulation software

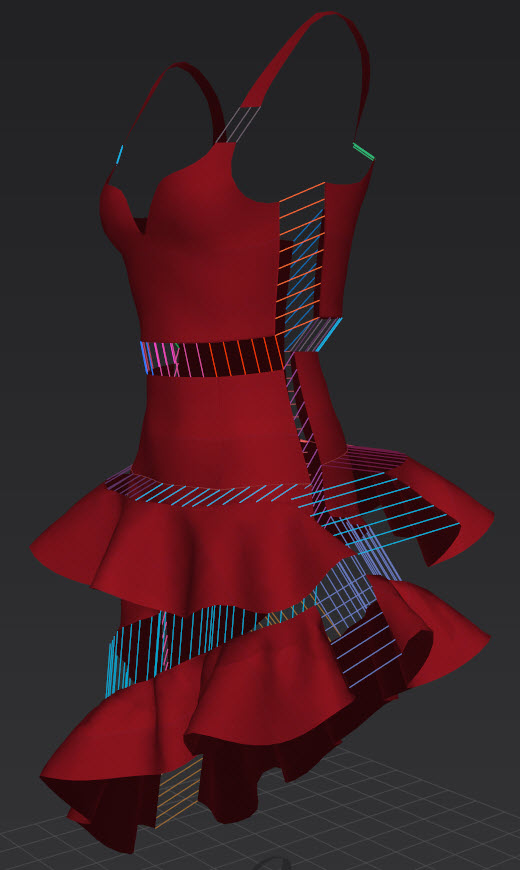
Digital clothing created with virtual sewing machine in a cloth simulation software

With the development of cloth simulation software such as CLO3D, Marvelous Designer and Optitex, seamsters can now draft patterns on the computer and visualize clothing designs by using the pattern creation tools and virtual sewing machines within these cloth simulation programs.

== In animals ==
Tailorbirds (genus Orthotomus), such as the common tailorbird, exhibit sewing behaviour, as do some birds of related genera. They are capable of stitching together the edges of leaves, using plant fibres or spider silk as thread, in order to create cavities in which to build their nests.

== See also ==
- Glossary of sewing terminology
- Glossary of textile manufacturing
- List of sewing occupations
- List of sewing stitches
- List of sewing tools and equipment
- Notions

== Sources ==
- Anawalt, Patricia Rieff (2007). The Worldwide History of Dress. Thames & Hudson. ISBN 978-0-500-51363-7.
- Barber, Elizabeth Wayland (1994). Women's Work:The First 20,000 Years. W. W. Norton.
- Huxley, Susan (1999). Sewing Secrets from the Fashion Industry: Proven Methods to Help You Sew Like the Pros. New York: Rodale Publishing. ISBN 978-0-87596-980-0.
- Meyrich, Elisaa (2006). RIP IT!: How to Deconstruct and Reconstruct the Clothes of Your Dreams. New York: Fireside. ISBN 978-0-7432-6899-8.
- Meyrich, Elissa (2002). Sew Fast Sew Easy: All You Need to Know When You Start to Sew. New York: St. Martin's Griffin. ISBN 0-312-26909-9.
- Reader's Digest (1976). Complete Guide to Sewing. The Reader's Digest Association, Inc. ISBN 0-89577-026-1.
- Picken, Mary Brooks (1957). The Fashion Dictionary. Funk and Wagnalls.
- Singer: The New Sewing Essentials. Creative Publishing International. ISBN 0-86573-308-2.
