= Butterick =

Butterick may refer to:

- Butterick Publishing Company

== People with the surname ==
- Ebenezer Butterick (1826–1903), American tailor, inventor and businessman
- Matthew Butterick (born 1970), American typographer, lawyer and writer
- Mike Butterick, a New Zealand politician
