= Dressmaker =

Person who makes women's clothing

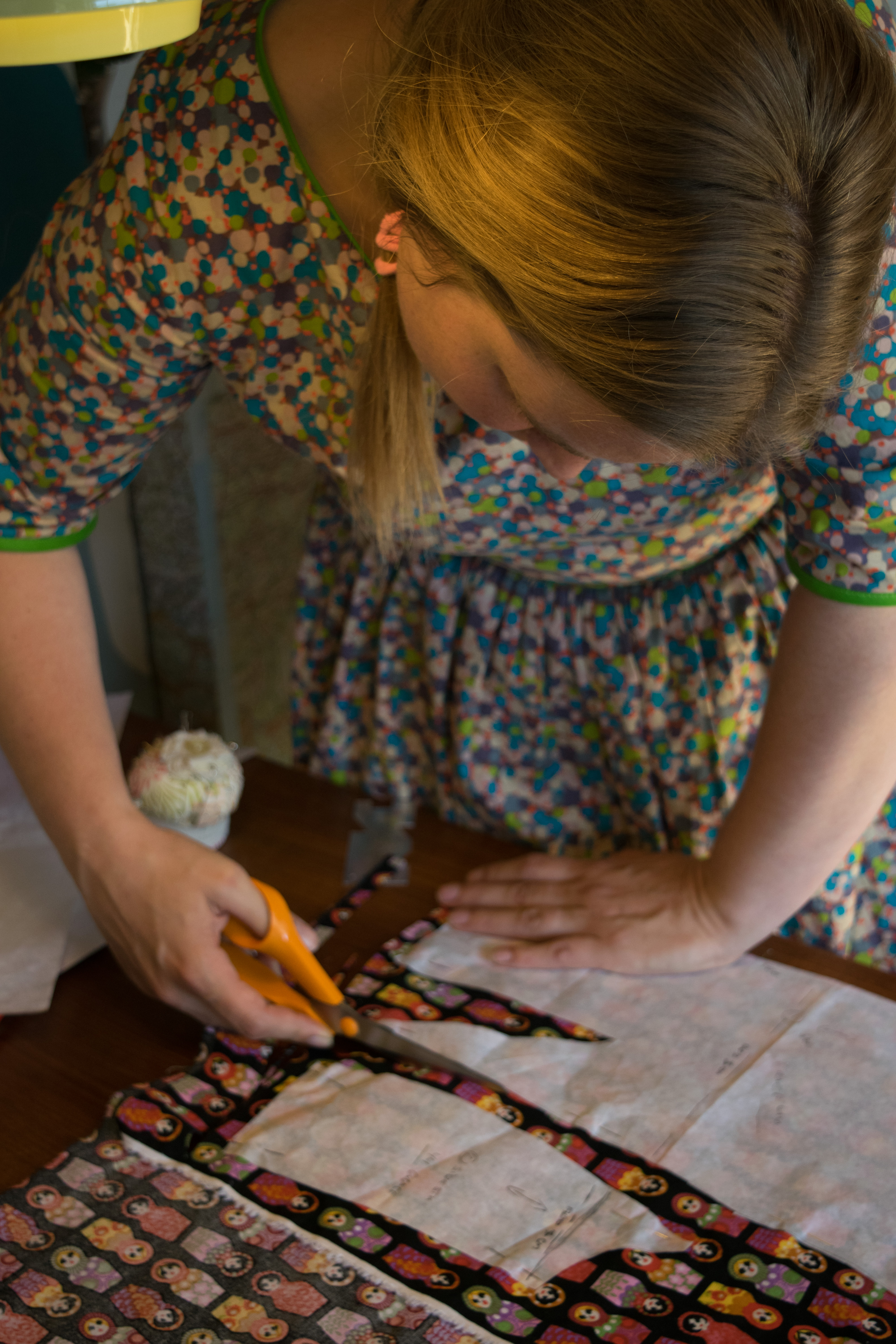
Cutting fabric for a dress using a pattern.

A dressmaker is a person who makes women's clothing, especially as an occupation. The activity or occupation is known as dressmaking.

A seamstress is a woman whose occupation is sewing and making clothes, and the term can be used for a dressmaker. A tailor, by comparison, makes, repairs and alters clothing, particularly garments such as jackets, trousers and coats.

== Terminology ==
In the 18th century, a dressmaker could be called a mantua-maker. The term originally referred to a maker of mantuas and later came to be used more generally for a dressmaker.

Modiste is an older term for a person who makes fashionable women's clothing.

== See also ==
- Fashion design
- List of sewing occupations
- Made-to-measure
- Pattern (sewing)
- Sewing
