= List of sewing occupations =

List of occupations requiring sewing skills.

- Bookbinder
- Cordwainer
- Corsetier
- Costume designer
- Draper
- Dressmaker
- Embroiderer
- Glover
- Hatter
- Knitter
- Leatherworker
- Milliner
- Parachute rigger
- Quilter
- Sailmaker
- Seamstress
- Shoemaker
- Tailor
- Taxidermist
- Upholsterer

== See also ==
- List of sewing tools and equipment
- Textile manufacturing
