= Judy W. Reed =

African American inventor and seamstress

Judy Woodford Reed
- Born: 1826; Charlottesville, Virginia, U.S.
- Died: 1905 (aged 78–79)
- Occupation: Inventor
- Known for: First African American woman to receive a US patent
- Notable work: Dough kneader and roller

Judy Woodford Reed (c. 1826 – c. 1905) was an African-American woman alive during the 1880s, whose only records are a US patent and censuses. Reed, from Virginia, is considered the first African American woman to receive a US patent. Patent No. 305,474 for a "Dough Kneader and Roller" was granted September 23, 1884. The patent was for an improved design of existing rollers with dough mixing more evenly while being kept covered and protected.

== Biography ==
Little is known about Judy Woodford Reed, or Reid. She first appears in the 1870 Federal Census as a 44 year old seamstress in Fredericksville Parish near Charlottesville, Virginia, in Albemarle County, along with her husband Allen, a gardener, and their five children Ten years later, Allen and Judy Reed were still in Virginia, this time with a grandson. Sometime between 1880 and 1885, Allen Reed died, and Judy W. Reed, calling herself "widow of Allen," moved to Washington, D. C., where she resided, with her children, at 1906 K Street, N. W.

It is unlikely that Reed was able to read, write, or even sign her name. Census enumerations refer to her and her husband as illiterate, and her patent is signed with an "X". Besides the limited records above, there are no known records of Reed. It is unknown whether any earlier African-American women received patent rights; there was no requirement to indicate race in the documents, and women often used only their initials to hide their gender. Until 1863 it was illegal for slaves to be literate, and those found reading, writing or teaching others could be punished severely or killed. The first African-American woman to fully sign a patent was Sarah E. Goode of Chicago. Her patent, 322,177, granted on July 14, 1885, was for a cabinet-bed, "that class of sectional bedsteads adapted to be folded together when not in use, so as to occupy less space, and made generally to resemble some article of furniture when so folded."

== Patent ==
Reed's first patent, Patent No. 305,474, made her the first African American women who officially received a US patent, inventing the Dough Kneader and Roller and was classified as "B29B7/562 Mixing; Kneading continuous, with mechanical mixing or kneading devices with movable mixing or kneading devices with rollers or the like, e.g. calenders with co-operating rollers, e.g. with repeated action, i.e. the material leaving a set of rollers being reconducted to the same set or being conducted to a next set with means for axially moving the material on the rollers".

The application itself was granted on September 9, 1884, with the subsequent publication follow in the same day on September 9, 1884. Her witnesses included Lewis McKenzie and John Ambler Smith. Her invention was an improved design on existing dough rollers.

== See also ==
- List of African-American inventors and scientists
- Timeline of United States inventions
