= Tailor's ham =

Stuffed pillow used in sewing

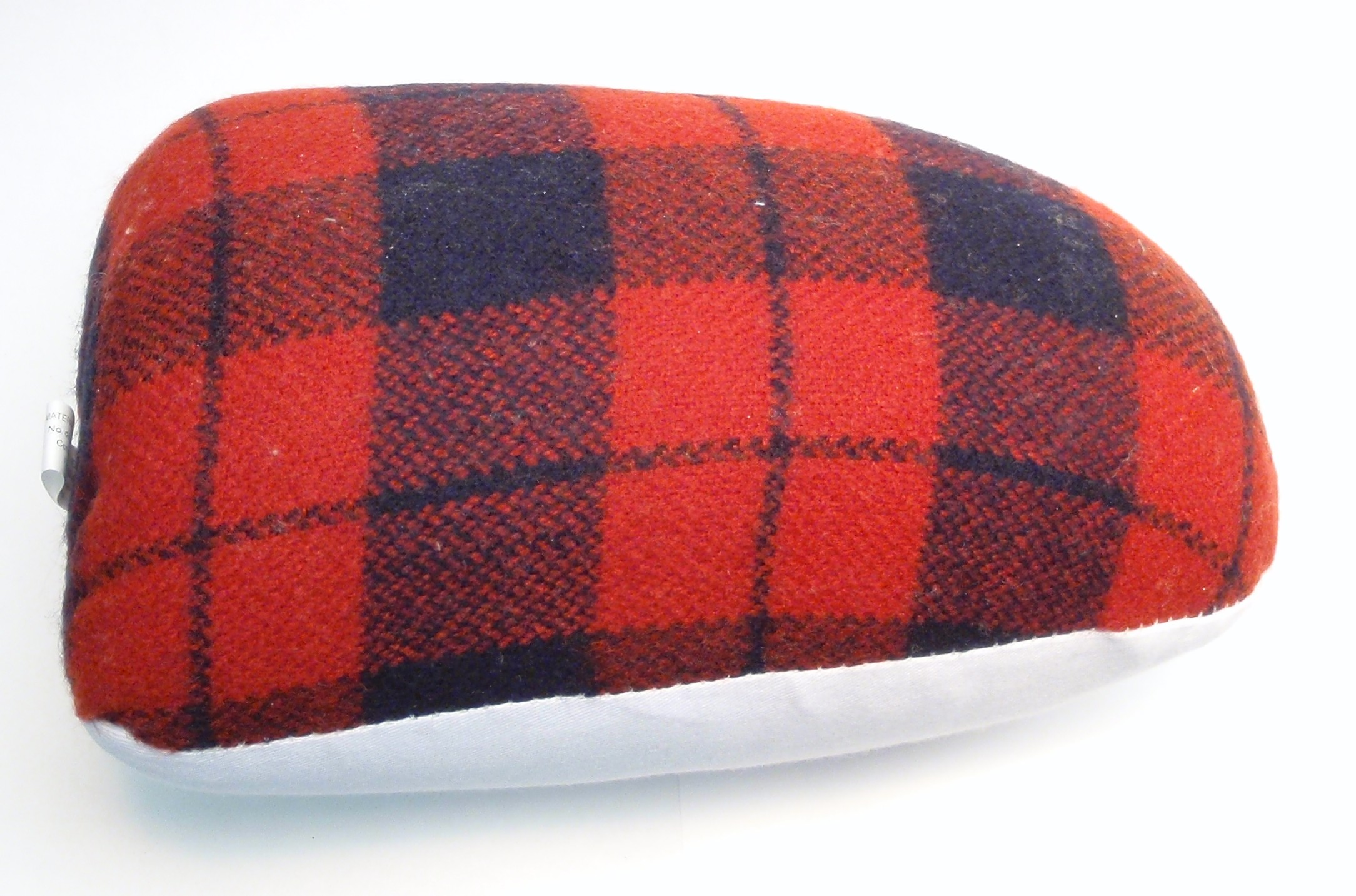
A tailor's ham

A tailor's ham or dressmaker's ham is a tightly stuffed pillow used as a curved mold when pressing curved areas of clothing, such as darts, sleeves, cuffs, collars, or waistlines. Pressing on a curved form allows a garment better to fit body contours. To accommodate tapering or garments of different sizes, it has roughly the shape of a ham.

It is possible to make a tailor's ham using a heavy weight fabric such as cotton canvas; a tailor's ham may be filled with sawdust or pieces of scrap fabric.
