= Ebenezer Butterick =

American tailor

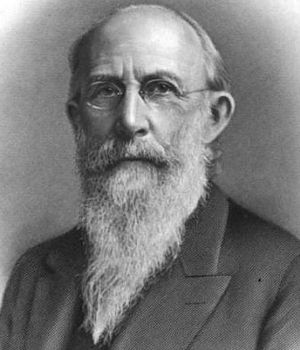
Ebenezer Butterick.

Ebenezer Butterick (29 May 1826 – 31 March 1903) was an American tailor, inventor, manufacturer, and fashion business executive, born in Sterling, Massachusetts.

== Life and work ==
He is regarded as the inventor, together with his wife Ellen Augusta Pollard Butterick, of tissue paper dress patterns offered in multiple standard sizes, also known as graded sewing patterns, which the couple began selling in 1863. The product revolutionized home sewing.

The premise of graded sewing patterns reportedly came from Mrs. Butterick's frustration with contemporary sewing patterns offered in only one size (frequently a different size for each pattern). Unless the intended wearer happened to match the size of the pattern, this necessitated manual resizing of the pieces (using paper, or directly on the fabric with wax chalk) before sewing could commence - a laborious and frustrating process. Offering each design in a graded series of standard-sized patterns would eliminate the need for such extensive pre-work. As a bespoke tailor, Mr Butterick was familiar with drafting custom patterns to fit different individuals, as well as the process of grading a "stock" pattern to a custom size. He began work on the templates, ultimately settling for the same thin tissue paper used by several pattern firms of the era for the patterns themselves, which had the advantages that it was thin enough to cut several dozen layers simultaneously (facilitating mass production) and could be easily folded and shipped across the country.

The Buttericks' graded patterns for home sewers became massively popular, as they made modern fashions and styles accessible to the rapidly expanding lower middle class; people that could not afford to purchase custom-made clothing in the latest style each season, but still wished to be fashionably dressed. The patterns were priced at 25 to 75 cents each, depending on complexity, making them an expensive indulgence for the working classes (who typically earned $1–2 per day in 1870) and out of reach for the truly poor.

The Butterick family began selling their patterns from their Sterling, Massachusetts, home in 1863, and the business expanded so quickly that, in one year, they had a factory at 192 Broadway Street in New York City. At first producing only boy's and men's clothing patterns, the Buttericks expanded to dresses and women's clothes in 1866. Eventually, women's patterns would be offered in 13 sizes for dresses, coats and blouses, and five sizes for skirts.

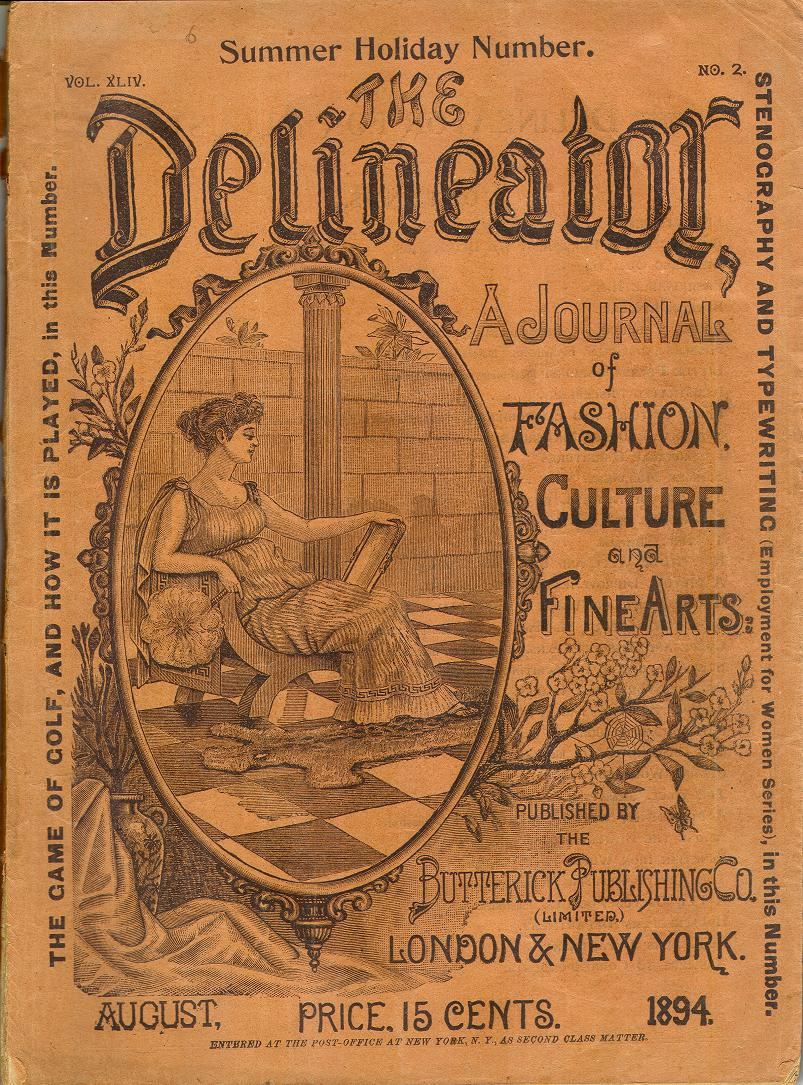
The Delineator, August 1894 cover.

In 1867 Butterick began publishing a magazine to promote their patterns, the Ladies Quarterly of Broadway Fashions, which was followed, in 1868, with the monthly Metropolitan. Both magazines offered fashion news and advice, as well as mail order services for Butterick's designs. In 1873, E. Butterick & Co. began publishing The Delineator, which, by the turn of the century, became the premiere women's fashion magazine in the US.

Mrs. Butterick died in 1871.

By 1876, E. Butterick & Co. had 100 branch offices and 1,000 agencies throughout the United States and Canada, and was becoming steadily more popular internationally, especially in Europe.

In 1881, the company reorganized as Butterick Publishing Company, and Ebenezer became its secretary, serving in this role until 1894.

In 1903, the Butterick building was designed and constructed on Spring Street and MacDougal Street in downtown Manhattan. The same year, Ebenezer Butterick died in Brooklyn, New York, aged 76.

On June 30, 1907, The New York Times published a story concerning the electric sign on the western side of the Butterick Building:

"[T]he Butterick Company has been moved to announce that the sign really is the largest in the world and to give some interesting facts about it. The initial B is 68 feet (21 m) high, about the height of an ordinary five-story building. The smaller letters are 50 feet (15 m) high and 5 feet (1.5 m) wide. About 1,400 electric lights are used for the illumination. It practically requires all the time of the one man to watch the sign and replace burned out lights."

== Processes and patents ==
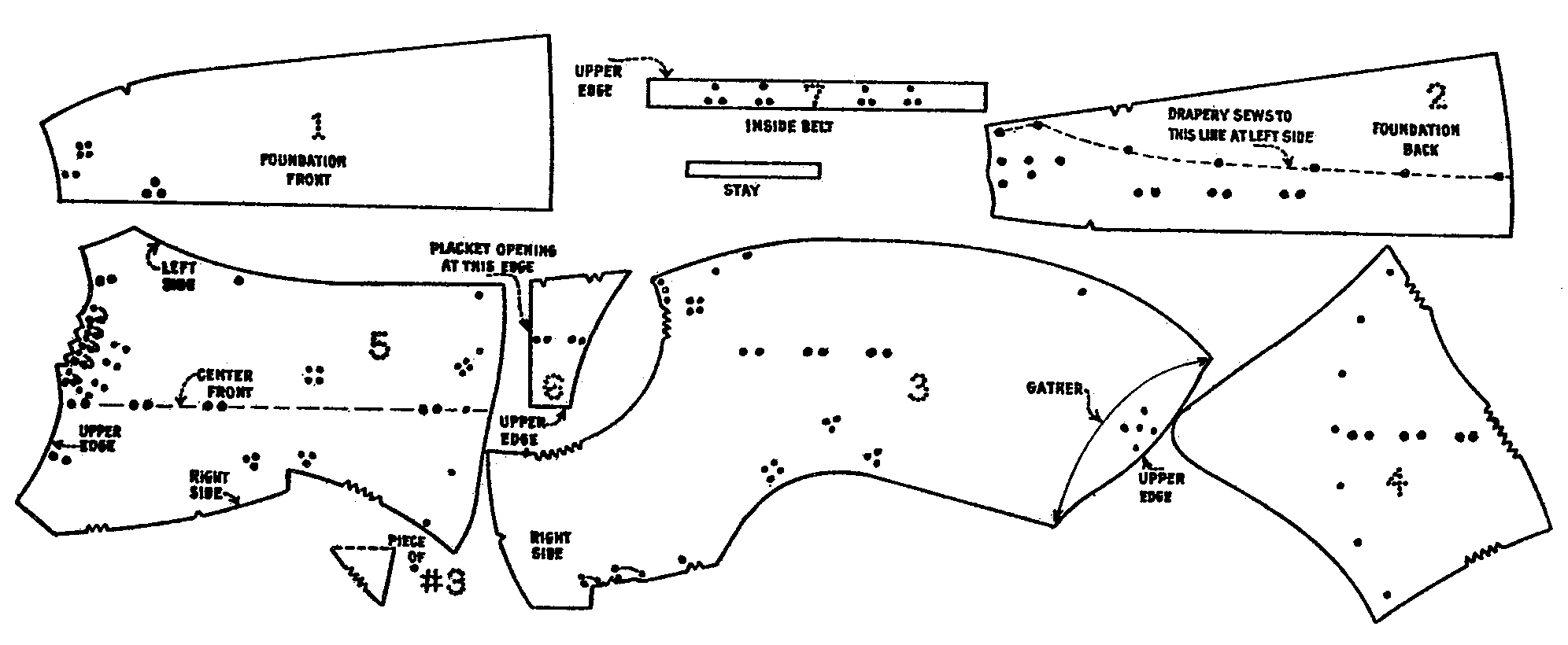
Facsimile of the pattern pieces for Butterick pattern #5688 (a skirt for an evening dress), circa 1919. Darts, stitching lines, etc. are indicated by perforations of different sizes and patterns (here represented as dots).

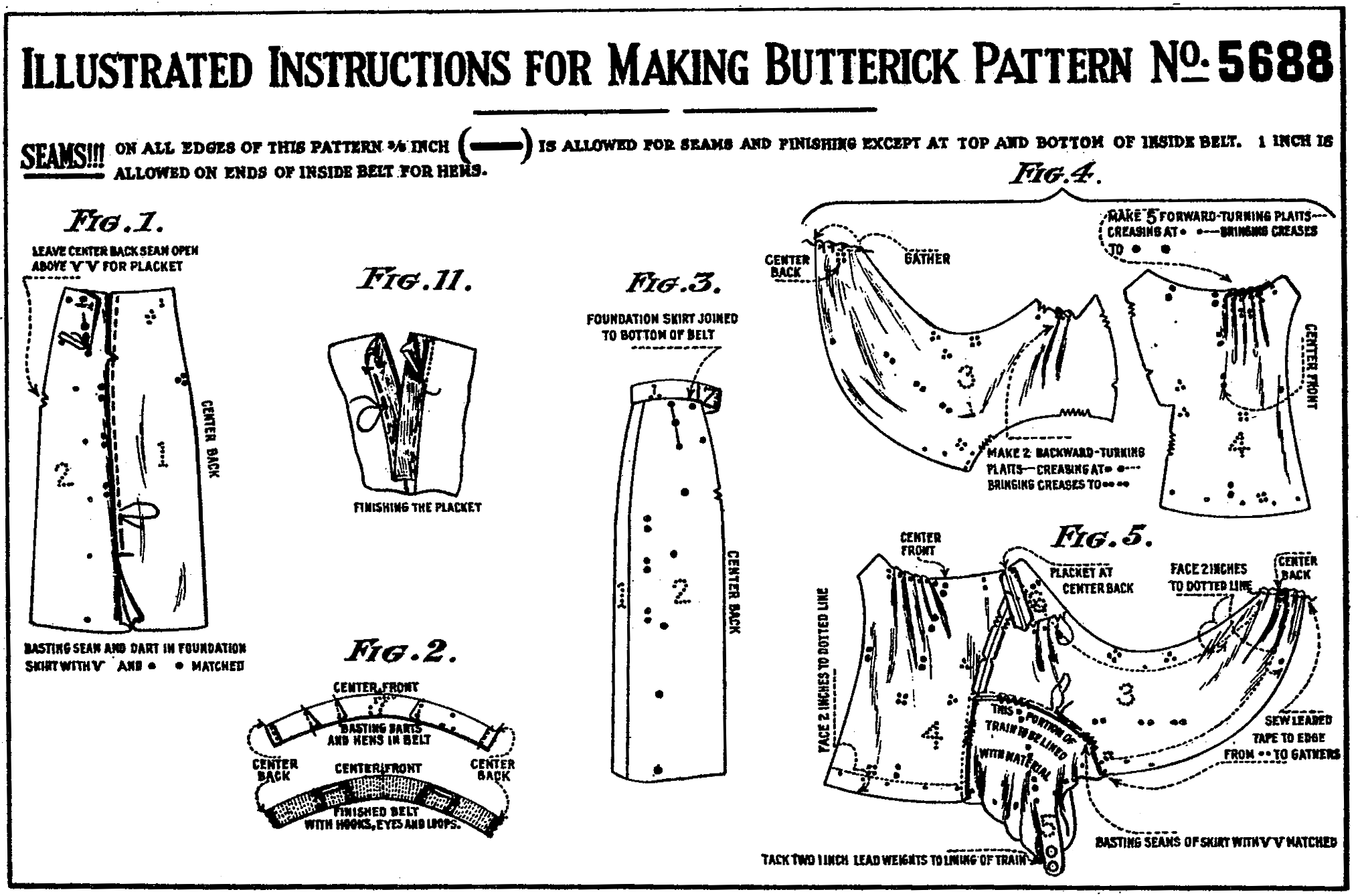
Facsimile of the front of the "Deltor" for Butterick pattern #5688 (a skirt for an evening dress), circa 1919.

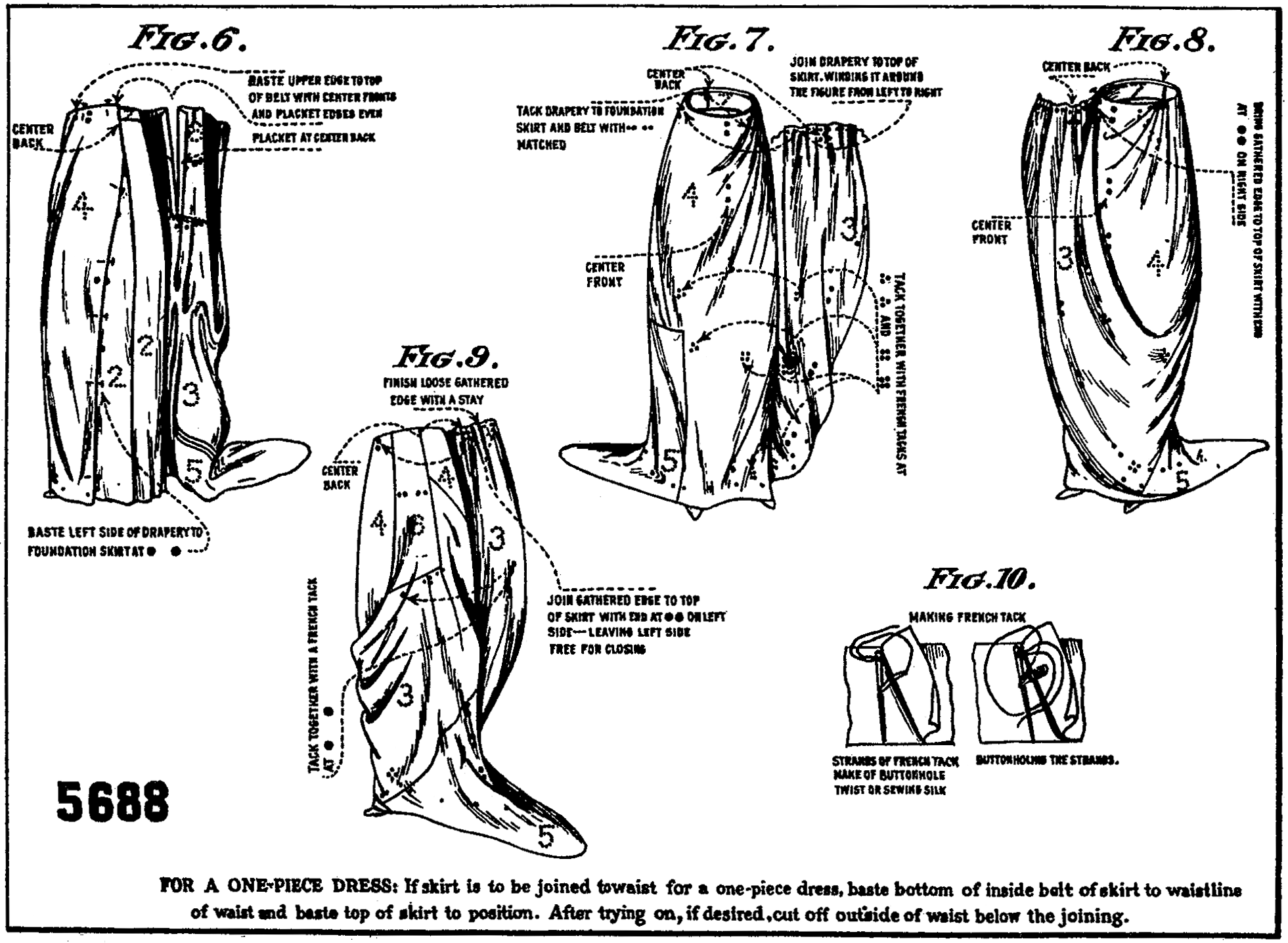
Facsimile of the back of the "Deltor" for Butterick pattern #5688 (a skirt for an evening dress), circa 1919.

The process that the Buttericks eventually settled on called for the corrected, graded master patterns to be made into thin cardboard templates. These were placed on a stack of tissue paper and cut around with a sharp knife; after all the pieces of each pattern were cut out, the tissue paper pieces were sorted, folded together and labeled with an image of the garment and brief instructions. Butterick offered precut patterns of this type until the late 1940s, when they began to produce uncut, printed patterns (as sold today). The patterns were offered one size to a package until the 1980s, when slower sales made "multisized" patterns (which had several different sizes in the same package) more cost effective.

At first, the pieces were not marked and no pattern layout was provided, leaving it up to the sewer to decide which piece was the collar, which the sleeve, etc. In the late 1890s, the company invented a method of identifying each piece (by means of a letter marked on it in a pattern of small holes), which was patented in 1899.

Around 1905, the packaging of the patterns was changed to an envelope rather than a pasted label, which gave more room for description and sewing instructions, including the first layout charts. As the 1910s wore on it became clear that home sewers wanted more detailed instructions than the envelope surface could accommodate, so a separate instruction sheet was included (named the "Deltor", a contraction of DELineaTOR, after Butterick's popular magazine), which was patented in 1919.
