= Dimethylol ethylene urea =

Names
- Preferred IUPAC name 1,3-Bis(hydroxymethyl)imidazolidin-2-one
- Other names Carbamol TsEM; 1,3-Dimethylol-2-imidazolidinone, Cassurit RI

Identifiers
CAS Number	136-84-5
3D model (JSmol)	Interactive image
ChemSpider	8380
ECHA InfoCard	100.004.786
EC Number	205-264-2
PubChem CID	8704
UNII	CV678N9PLY
CompTox Dashboard (EPA)	DTXSID5059666
- InChI: InChI=1S/C5H10N2O3/c8-3-6-1-2-7(4-9)5(6)10/h8-9H,1-4H2 Key: WVJOGYWFVNTSAU-UHFFFAOYSA-N; InChI=1/C5H10N2O3/c8-3-6-1-2-7(4-9)5(6)10/h8-9H,1-4H2 Key: WVJOGYWFVNTSAU-UHFFFAOYAV
- SMILES: C1CN(C(=O)N1CO)CO

Properties
Chemical formula	C_{5}H_{10}N_{2}O_{3}
Molar mass	146.146 g·mol^{−1}
Appearance	White resin
Density	1.4±0.1 g/cm^{3}
Melting point	101 to 103 °C (214 to 217 °F; 374 to 376 K)
Boiling point	342.6±27 °C
Solubility in water	72g/L (25 °C)

Hazards
- Occupational safety and health (OHS/OSH)
Main hazards	Skin Sensitive; Suspected of causing cancer(inhalation)
Flash point	161.0±23.7 °C
- Except where otherwise noted, data are given for materials in their standard state (at 25 °C [77 °F], 100 kPa). verify (what is ?) Infobox references

Dimethylol ethylene urea is an organic compound derived from formaldehyde and urea. It is a colourless solid that is used for treating cellulose-based heavy fabrics to inhibit wrinkle formation. Dimethylol ethylene urea (DMEU) bonds with the hydroxyl groups present in long cellulose chains and prevents the formation hydrogen bonding between the chains, the primary cause of wrinkling. This treatment produces permanently wrinkle-resistant fabrics and is different from the effects achieved from using fabric softeners. An additional names for DMEU includes 1,3-bis(hydroxymethyl)-tetrahydro-2-imidazolone.

== Mechanism ==
Wrinkles form in cotton fabrics due to the free hydroxyl groups. Cotton is a form of cellulose chains linked to form firm three-dimensional structures that offer both tensile strength and flexibility due to their carbon-carbon and carbon-oxygen bond based backbone. Since cellulose is composed of glucose units, cyclic carbohydrate molecules, cellulose has free hydroxyl groups (-OH) projecting from each monomeric subunit. These hydroxyl groups tend form hydrogen-bonds to neighboring hydroxyl groups. When the fabric is stressed either by heat or pressure, the original hydrogen bonds in the cotton fabric break and reform with nearby atoms at random. This re-forming of the hydrogen bonds, known as cross linking, is the reason for wrinkles, or creases, in the fabric. DMEU works to prevent these wrinkles by covalently bonding to two free hydroxyl groups in the fabric through a dehydration reaction that is not as easily broken as the hydrogen bond before treatment.

As seen in the figure, this formation of a C-O bond through a dehydration reaction (loss of water) allows the fabric to be bleached and heated to reasonable temperatures without fear of breaking the C-O bonds formed.

DMEU is applied industrially to the fabric after all the creases desired for design are in place. The fabric is heated and a DMEU resin is slathered on to the fabric. Depending on the procedure, the residue may contain metal catalysts or acid catalysts to help with the reaction. The utilization of DMEU in conjunction with a small concentration of tetraethoxysilane (TEOS) helps to improve the tensile strength of the treated material and decreases the yellowing of the material

== Production ==
The production of DMEU is through the condensation of formaldehyde with ethylene urea:

2CH_{2}O + (C_{2}H_{4}N_{2}H_{2})CO → (C_{2}H_{2}N_{2}(CH_{2}OH)_{2})CO

The reaction proceeds around 200 °C (392 °F) but this temperature can be brought down to around 70 °C (158 °F) in the presence of an acid catalyst. Ethylene urea, sodium hydroxide, and paraformaldehyde are often dissolved in methanol during the synthesis of DMEU.

== History ==
Before the development of DMEU, formaldehyde and its derivatives were used as anti-wrinkle agents.. After contact with chlorine bleaches at high temperatures, however, the treated fabric released hydrochloric acid, which degraded the fabric. Additionally, formaldehyde evaporates easily and is pungent. The search for stabler alternatives to formaldehyde led to dimethylol formaldehyde derivatives such as DMEU.

The five member ring structure of DMEU, a 2-imidazolidone, resists attack by chlorine during bleaching. As an additional advantage, DMEU can be used to treat fabrics at relatively mild conditions and is odorless. The use of DMEU on cotton was patented by Rohm and Haas Co. in 1941. As suitable as DMEU was as an anti-wrinkle agent, it decreases dramatically the tensile strength of the fabric. Because DMEU inhibited new hydrogen bond formation, it also hindered the spreadability of cotton fibers under pressure. This problem regarding the loss of tensile strength is common amongst cotton treatments. Another common problem from treatment of DMEU is the yellowing of the treated fabric, because of the acidic conditions with high amounts of heat. Currently, DMEU is used along with other formaldehyde urea derivatives for cotton fabrics of varying tear strength, color, softness, and ease of care.

Many DMEU-related cyclic urea derivatives used to synthesize urea-formaldehyde resins also have applications in treating paper, but DMEU has not proven useful in this regard.

== Health concerns ==
DMEU is a formaldehyde derivative and thus has been known to cause irritation of the skin and allergic reactions from those who are exposed to the resin for extended periods of time. DMEU is a mild irritant and if consumed in moderate quantities may have adverse effects on the body. Additionally, DMEU is considered carcinogenic to humans based its inclusion as a formaldehyde derivative. In 2004 the WHO International Agency for Research on Cancer designated formaldehyde as a carcinogen, making all of its derivatives also carcinogenic. As a result of these health concerns there are alternate areas of research in ionic crosslinking compounds as opposed to DMEU and other formaldehyde-based crosslinking compounds.
