= Sarah E. Goode =

American inventor (1855–1905)

- Born: Sarah Elizabeth Jacobs; 1855; Toledo, Ohio, US
- Died: April 8, 1905 (aged 49–50); Chicago, Illinois, US
- Occupations: Inventor and entrepreneur
- Known for: One of the first African-American women to receive a United States patent

Sarah Elisabeth Goode (1855 – April 8, 1905) was an American entrepreneur and inventor. She was the fourth known African American woman to receive a United States patent, which she received in 1885 for her cabinet bed.

== Biography ==
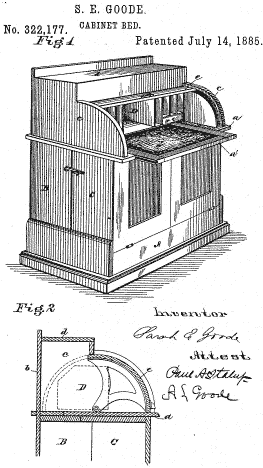
Patent issued to Sarah E. Goode for the folding bed cabinet

Goode was originally named Sarah Elisabeth Jacobs. When she was young, her father worked as a waiter, and her mother kept the house. Her mother also served as an organizer for the Ohio Anti-Slavery Society in Toledo, which was a stop on the Underground Railroad. Little is known about Goode’s early life, but before 1870, Goode’s family moved to Chicago, Illinois, and her father began working in carpentry. There, she married Archibald Goode and had children with him. Their known children are daughters Estella, Inza (or Inez), Harriet (Hattie), Edna, and Sarah Goode. Archibald worked as a stair builder and an upholsterer, and he and Sarah opened a furniture store.

== Invention and furniture store years ==
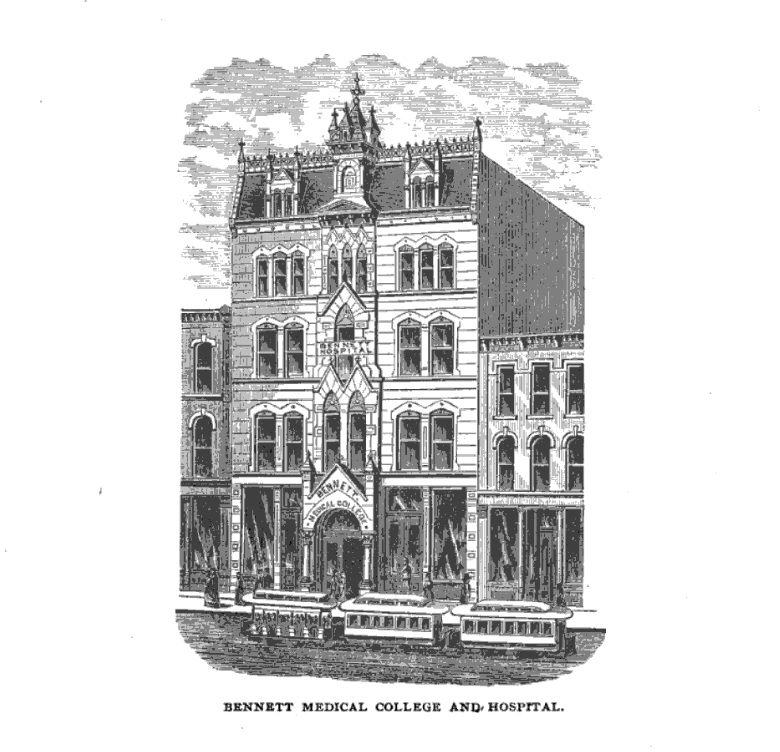
Location of Sarah's storefront in 1885

In 1885, Sarah and her husband operated a furniture store at 513 State Street in Chicago. The space was located at Bennett Medical College of Eclectic Medicine and Surgery which housed the storefront. A Chicago Tribune article from September 1884 mentioned that S. E. Goode was exhibiting her French Flat Folding-Bed at the 32nd Annual Illinois State Fair. She had sent in her invention paperwork with the help of attorney George P. Barton of Chicago in November of 1883. It would be $35 in fees and twenty months of waiting, getting rejected, making adjustments, and resubmitting before she would finally receive the patent. By 1887, that furniture store was no longer on record. However, there was a furniture listing under Archie's name further down State Street.

=== Concept of the folding bed ===
Most customers of Goode's furniture store were working-class people who lived in small apartments that couldn’t fit a lot of furniture, including beds. As well as this, at the time of her invention, New York City passed a law that restricted buildings to be under 80 feet (24 m). Tenement buildings were also restricted to footprints of 25 by 100 feet (7.6 by 30.5 m). As Goode heard this problem from her customers in Chicago, she set out to help Chicago apartment dwellers with limited space in their apartments. Goode invented a folding bed that would become the precursor to the Murphy Bed - a hide-away bed. It was a cabinet bed which folded into a roll-top desk which had compartments for writing supplies and stationery. Her goal was to balance the weight of the folding of the bed so it could be easily lifted up and held in its place and also provide supplementary support to the center of the bed when it was unfolded. In 1885, for her invention of the folding bed, Goode was one of the first African American women to receive a US patent.

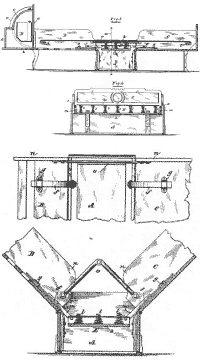
Cabinet bed patent diagram. The bed folds up to create space.

== Early patents among African American women ==
Sarah E. Goode was the fourth African American woman known to have received a US patent. The first and second were Martha Jones of Amelia County, Virginia, for her 1868 corn-husker upgrade and Mary Jones De Leon of Baltimore, Maryland, for her 1873 cooking apparatus. Judy W. Reed’s dough roller was the third, patented in 1884, one year before Sarah's cabinet bed. The Patent Office did not ask applicants to specify race or gender patent applications, only for confirmation that the patentee was an American citizen.

== Historic barriers in the patent process ==
Until a few decades prior to Sarah's invention, African Americans faced several barriers when applying for patents. Initially, some masters allowed enslaved people to apply for patents, but masters retained ownership of the patent process and profits. Originally free persons of color were said to have no federal obstacles to securing patents. However, in 1857, the Dred Scott decision declared that African Americans, free or enslaved, were not citizens and thus could not hold office, vote, or secure patents. The Black Codes were also in effect in many states into the 1860s and limited the ability of African Americans to own property and patents. Following the American Civil War, African Americans were given equal rights under the law and officially became recognized as citizens, allowing them to again secure patents. Historically, women faced challenges in the patent process as well. The 1790 federal patent process allowed “persons”, not just men, to seek patents federally. However, many states limited the patent and property rights of women, creating an obstacle. These limitations decreased starting in 1839 and over the following decades. However, limitations to higher education institutions that specialized in scientific training were still a barrier. Financial backing and informal patent assistance were also both limited when it came to women's inventions as compared to men's, making the process of attaining a patent more difficult.

== Sarah's later years ==
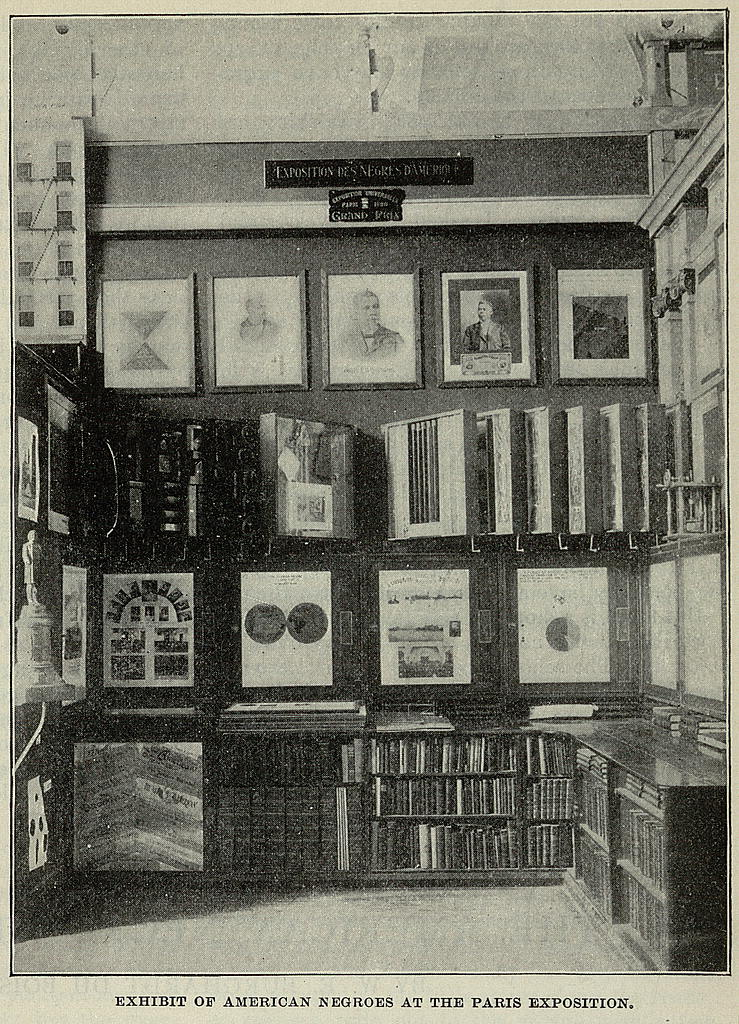
W. E. B. Du Bois's exhibit featuring Sarah's patent and other African American inventors

It’s unclear if Sarah worked on more inventions following her folding bed which helped a lot of people. However, her husband Archie’s invention of an automatic garbage box was praised by the Chicago Civic Federation and published in a local newspaper in 1895. The Paris Exposition of 1900 featured a section called The Exhibit of American Negroes, organized by Thomas J. Calloway and W. E. B. Du Bois, with the help of Henry E. Baker's patent research. Sarah E. Goode was one of four women identified in the exhibit's showcase of African American inventors.

== Legacy ==
Goode died in Chicago on April 18, 1905 and is buried at the city's Graceland Cemetery. In 2012, the Sarah E. Goode STEM Academy, a science and math based school, was opened in south Chicago to honor her contributions. The school focuses on science, technology, engineering, and math (STEM) to help prepare students for their careers. It is part of the Chicago Public Schools Urban Model High School (UMHS).

Sarah E. Goode STEM Academy is also a P-TECH school (Pathways in Technology Early College High School). P-TECH connects students to employment opportunities in promising fields, and offers a chance to take college courses in high school and to earn credits toward both - known as dual enrolment.

== In popular culture ==
In 2019, author Vivian Kirkfield published a children’s book about Sarah’s life as an inventor, titled Sweet Dreams, Sarah.
