= Ellen Eglin =

African-American inventor (1849–after 1890)

Ellen F. Eglin
- Born: 1849; Washington, DC, U.S.
- Died: c. 1915 (aged c. 66); Washington, DC
- Occupation: Housekeeper
- Known for: Inventor of a clothes wringer

Ellen F. Eglin (before 1849 – after 1890) was an African-American inventor who invented a clothes wringer.

== Early life and employment ==
Eglin was born in 1849 in Washington, D.C., with few details available about her childhood and earlier life. Eglin worked as a clerk in a local census office and as a housekeeper where she was a servant to Timothy Nooning and his wife Malintha and their son William.

== Clothes wringer ==
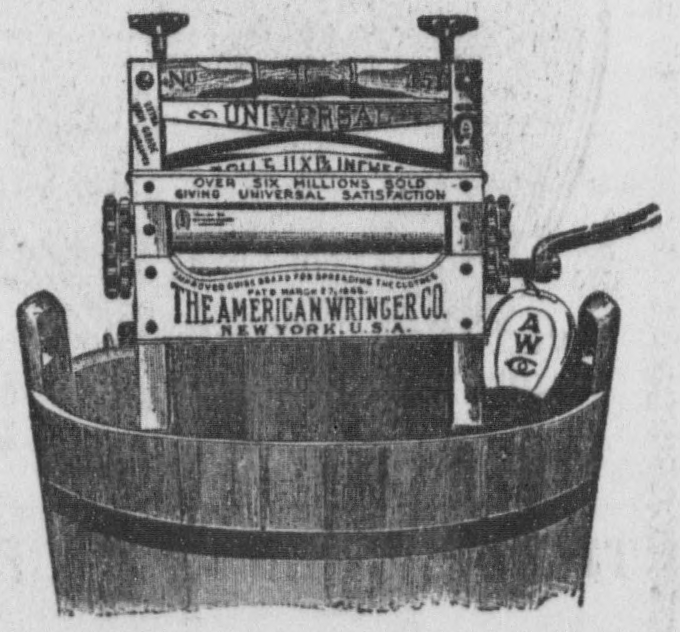
Example of a clothes wringer that was used during the 19th century.

Eglin's invention was a clothes wringer, no details are recorded. In 1888, Eglin sold the invention to an agent, for $18. According to Charlotte Smith of The Woman Inventor, when questioned why she decided to sell her invention, she replied, "You know I am black and if it was known that a Negro woman patented the invention, white ladies would not buy the wringer; I was afraid to be known because of my color in having it introduced in the market, that is the only reason."

== Beneficiary ==
We do not know the name of the agent who bought the invention from Eglin, still less the eventual beneficiary if any. It has been suggested that Cyrenus Wheeler Jr acquired it, and registered it as US patent 459343. Wheeler, who bought a wringer company around this time, is known to have said he had twelve patents for improvements to clothes wringers, nine of his own invention and three that he bought. Shortly after the time of Eglin's invention companies such as American Wringer Co. were buying as many wringer patents as they could and manufacturing them for retail. There is no record showing whether Eglin's patent was acquired by American Wringer Co. Charlotte Smith reported that "The wringer is a great financial success to the present owner."

== Later work ==
After selling her clothes-wringer, Eglin was working another invention and planned to patent it in her own name. Although she wanted to exhibit the new model at the Women's International Industrial Inventors Congress (WIIIC), where, anyone was invited regardless of race, she never patented it. Eglin never appeared at the WIIIC and the mystery invention was never documented. It is rumored that she went on to work as a clerk in a census office.

== Last years ==
Little is known about the later stages of Eglin's life, including the place or date of her death. Eglin appears to have spent the rest of her life in Washington, DC. In 1890, she was employed by the United States Department of the Interior as a charwoman in the Census Office. She appeared in the local city directories from about 1888 living at 1929 11th Street, N. W. with her brother Charles, a Union Navy veteran who was a teamster. Charles Eglin died in July 1896, leaving his estate divided between his three siblings, including Ellen.

Ellen Eglin last appears in the Washington city directories in 1916.

== External sources ==
- Patent of a Clothes Wringer from 1888
- "Women Inventors", New Scientist, 24 May 1984, p. 10.
