= National Historic Chemical Landmarks =

American Chemical Society program to recognize significant achievements in chemistry

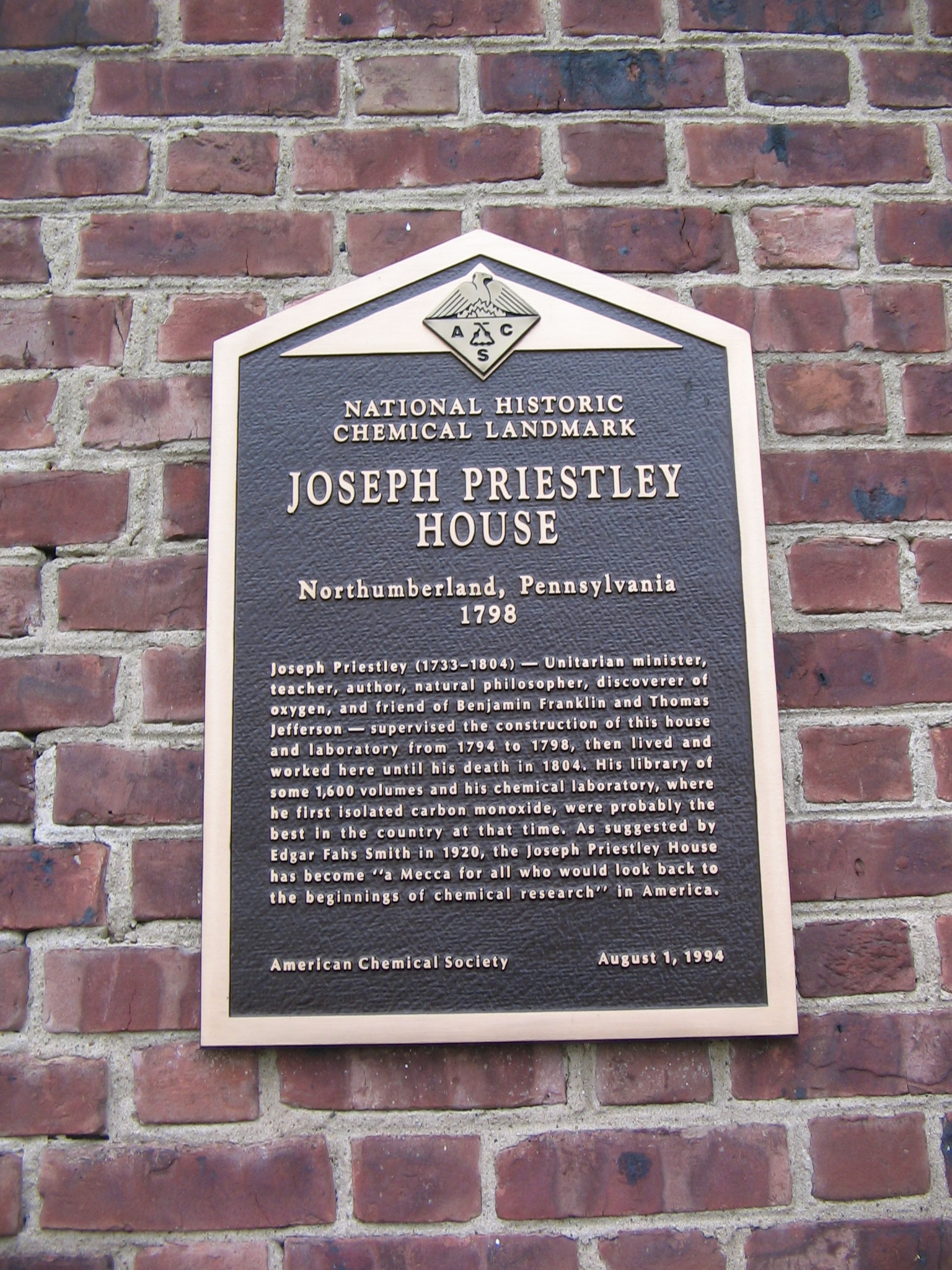
Plaque noting National Historic Chemical Landmark status at the Joseph Priestley House.

The National Historic Chemical Landmarks program was launched by the American Chemical Society in 1992 to recognize significant achievements in the history of chemistry and related professions. The program celebrates the centrality of chemistry. The designation of such generative achievements in the history of chemistry demonstrates how chemists have benefited society by fulfilling the ACS vision: Improving people's lives through the transforming power of chemistry. The program occasionally designates International Historic Chemical Landmarks to commemorate "chemists and chemistry from around the world that have had a major impact in the United States".

== List of landmarks ==
=== 1993 ===
- Bakelite, the world's first completely synthetic plastic, developed by Leo Baekeland around 1907

=== 1994 ===
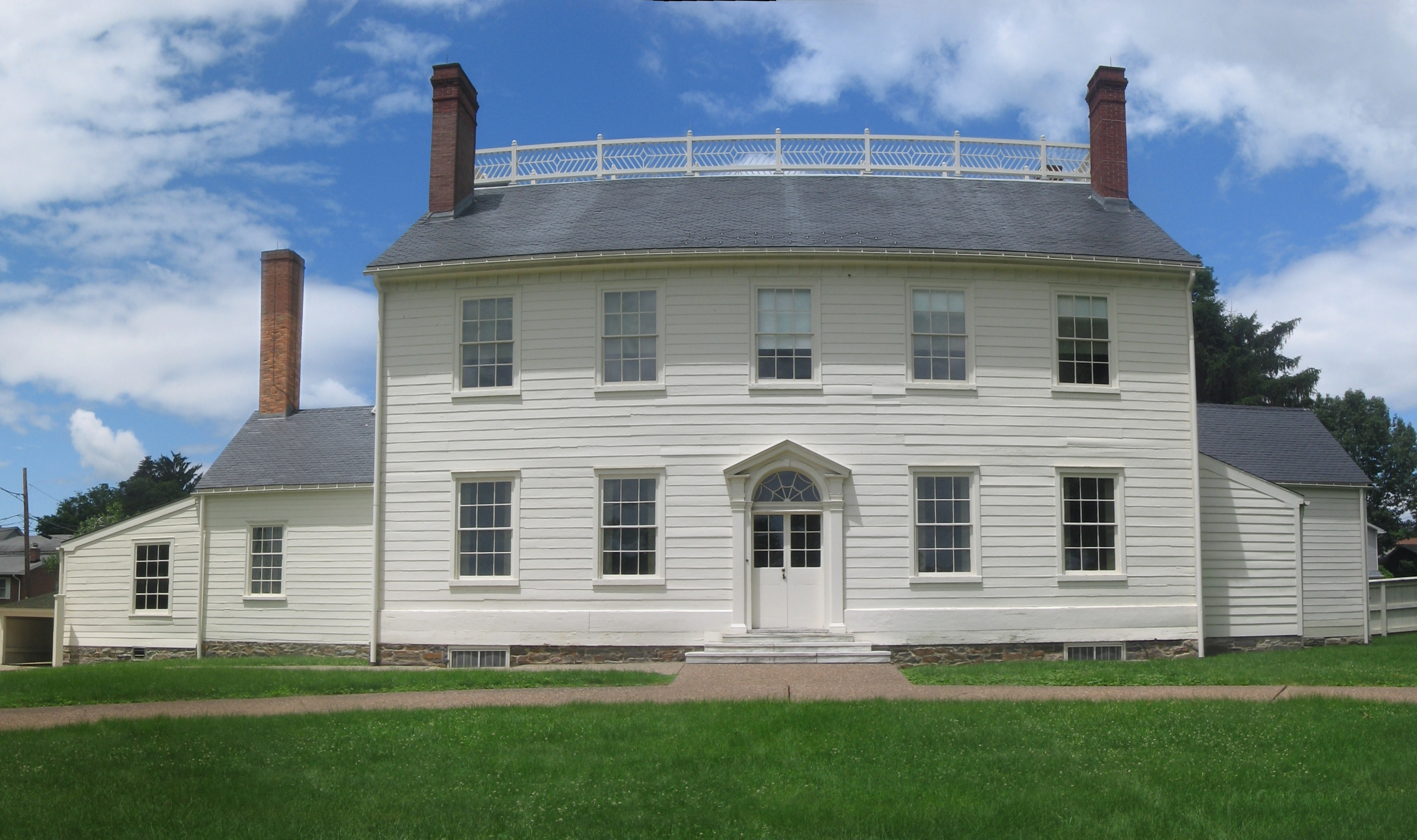
The Joseph Priestley House in Northumberland, Pennsylvania.

- Chandler Chemistry Laboratory at Lehigh University, constructed in 1884
- Joseph Priestley House, U.S. home of Joseph Priestley, discoverer of oxygen, from 1798 to 1804

=== 1995 ===
- Research on the atomic weight of oxygen conducted by Edward Morley at Case Western Reserve University, published in 1895
- Nylon, the first totally synthetic fiber used in consumer products, commercialized by DuPont in 1939
- First U.S. facility to produce acetyl chemicals commercially using coal gasification technology, opened by Eastman Chemical Company in 1983
- Riverside Laboratory for oil refining research, constructed by Universal Oil Products in 1921

=== 1996 ===
- Williams-Miles History of Chemistry Collection at Harding University, established in 1992
- The Houdry process for catalytic cracking of crude petroleum into gasoline, developed by Eugene Houdry and the Sun Oil Company in the 1930s
- Kem-Tone Wall Finish, the first commercially successful water-based paint, introduced by Sherwin-Williams in 1941
- The Sohio process for production of acrylonitrile, developed by Sohio in 1957 and commercialized in 1960

=== 1997 ===
- First use of radiation chemistry for commercial products by Raychem Corporation in 1957
- Electrolytic production of bromine (also known as the Dow process) by Herbert Henry Dow in 1891 at the Evens Mill in Midland, Michigan
- The Hall-Héroult process for production of aluminum by electrochemistry, discovered by American chemist Charles Martin Hall in 1886 and independently the same year by French chemist Paul Héroult
- Gilman Hall at the University of California, Berkeley, built between 1916 and 1917 in Berkeley, California

=== 1998 ===
- Discovery of histamine H_{2}-receptor antagonists and the introduction of Tagamet by scientists at Smith Kline and French in 1976
- Discovery of an electric arc process for the commercial production of calcium carbide and acetylene, discovered by Canadian inventor Thomas Willson in 1892
- Research and production of synthetic rubber, developed by the United States Synthetic Rubber Program between 1939 and 1945
- Havemeyer Hall at Columbia University, built between 1896 and 1898 under the direction of Charles Frederick Chandler in New York City, New York
- First commercial fluid bed reactor for petroleum cracking, which went on stream in 1942 at the Baton Rouge Refinery of the Standard Oil Company of New Jersey
- The Raman Effect, discovered by Indian physicist Chandrasekhara Venkata Raman in 1928 at the Indian Association for the Cultivation of Science

=== 1999 ===
- Hermann Staudinger's research on macromolecular chemistry at the University of Freiburg between 1926 and 1956
- Synthesis of physostigmine by Percy Lavon Julian at DePauw University in 1935, which made physostigmine readily available for the treatment of glaucoma
- Work of Antoine Lavoisier to elucidate the principles of modern chemistry in the late 1700s
- Synthesis of progesterone by Russell Marker at Pennsylvania State University in 1938 (a process now known as Marker degradation), and the development of the Mexican steroid hormone industry by Syntex S.A. in the 1940s
- Separation of rare earth elements by Charles James at the University of New Hampshire in the early 1900s
- Discovery of polypropylene and development of a new high-density polyethylene by J. Paul Hogan and Robert Banks at Phillips Petroleum Company in 1951
- Discovery of penicillin by Alexander Fleming at St Mary's Hospital, London in 1928, and its large-scale development between 1939 and 1945 at the USDA Northern Regional Research Laboratory, Abbott Laboratories, Lederle Laboratories, Merck & Co., Inc., Chas. Pfizer & Co., Inc., and E.R. Squibb & Sons

=== 2000 ===
- Edgar Fahs Smith Memorial Collection in the history of chemistry at the University of Pennsylvania, opened in 1931
- Discovery of helium in natural gas by Hamilton Cady and David Ford McFarland at the University of Kansas in 1905
- Isolation of organic free radicals by Moses Gomberg at the University of Michigan in 1900
- Discovery of new elements beyond Curium by researchers at the Lawrence Berkeley National Laboratory in Berkeley, California
- Bowood House in Wiltshire, U.K., site of Joseph Priestley's discovery of oxygen in 1774
- Nucleic acid and protein chemistry at Rockefeller University
- Wallace Carothers' research on polymers at DuPont between 1928 and 1937

=== 2001 ===
- Savannah Pulp and Paper Laboratory (now the Herty Advanced Materials Development Center), founded by Charles H. Herty Sr. in 1932
- Commercialization of the Hall-Héroult process for producing aluminum by the Pittsburgh Reduction Company in 1888
- John William Draper and the founding of the American Chemical Society in 1876
- The National Bureau of Standards (now National Institute of Standards and Technology), founded in 1901

=== 2002 ===
- Invention of the multiple-effect evaporator for processing sugar by Norbert Rillieux in 1846
- Discovery of Vitamin C by Albert Szent-Györgyi between 1930 and 1936
- Noyes Laboratory at the University of Illinois at Urbana Champaign, named for chemist William A. Noyes and opened in 1902
- Development of occupational medicine by Alice Hamilton at Hull House between 1897 and 1935
- Research on the quality and stability of frozen foods conducted at the USDA-ARS Western Regional Research Center between 1948 and 1965

=== 2003 ===
- The discovery of Camptothecin (1966) and Taxol (1971) at the Research Triangle Institute by Monroe E. Wall, Mansukh C. Wani, and colleagues
- Establishment of the Polymer Research Institute (now Polytechnic Institute of New York University) by Herman Mark in 1946, the first academic facility in the United States devoted to the study and teaching of polymer science
- Development of high-performance carbon fibers at Union Carbide Corporation (now GrafTech International) between 1958 and 1970

=== 2004 ===
- Development of the Beckman pH meter by Arnold Orville Beckman in 1935
- Research on cotton products, including the development of durable press and flame retardant cotton by the USDA-Agricultural Research Service's Southern Regional Research Center in the 1950s and 1960s
- Research on carbohydrate metabolism and establishment of the Cori cycle in 1929 by Carl and Gerty Cori, at the Washington University School of Medicine

=== 2005 ===
- George Washington Carver's research in new agricultural products, crop rotation, and soil fertility at Tuskegee University between 1896 and 1943
- Isolation of antibiotics, including streptomycin (in 1943), by Selman Waksman at Rutgers University Cook Campus
- Columbia Dry Cell, the first sealed dry cell battery successfully manufactured for the mass market, by the National Carbon Company in 1896

=== 2006 ===
- Neil Bartlett's demonstration of the first reaction of a noble gas at the University of British Columbia in 1962
- Modern baking powder, developed by Eben Horsford at the Rumford Chemical Works (now Clabber Girl) in 1869
- Tide, the first heavy-duty synthetic laundry detergent, developed by Procter & Gamble in 1946

=== 2007 ===
- Food dehydration technology developed at the USDA-Agricultural Research Service-Eastern Regional Research Center in the 1950s-1970s
- Chemical Abstracts Service, established by the American Chemical Society in 1907
- Scotch Tape, developed by Richard Gurley Drew at 3M in 1930
- Chemistry at Jamestown, Virginia, the earliest evidence of European chemical technologies in the United States, circa 1607

=== 2008 ===
- Production and distribution of radioisotopes for civilian research and medical use at the Oak Ridge National Laboratory in 1946
- Development of deep-tank fermentation for the mass production of penicillin by Pfizer in the 1940s
- Development of acrylic emulsion technology for the production of acrylic paint by Rohm and Haas in 1953

=== 2009 ===
- Development of the Pennsylvania oil industry by Edwin Drake and Samuel Kier in the 1850s
- Deciphering of the genetic code by Marshall Warren Nirenberg and J. Heinrich Matthaei at the National Institutes of Health in the 1960s

=== 2010 ===
- Diagnostic test strips, developed by Helen Murray Free and Alfred Free at Miles Laboratories (now Bayer AG) in the 1950s
- Discovery of fullerenes by Richard Smalley, Robert Curl, James R. Heath, Sean O'Brien, and Harold Kroto at Rice University in 1985

=== 2011 ===
- Development of the Varian A-60 NMR Spectrometer in 1960, and the development of MRI by Paul Lauterbur at Stony Brook University in the 1970s

=== 2012 ===
- DayGlo fluorescent pigments, developed by Bob Switzer and Joe Switzer of Switzer Brothers, Inc., (now Day-Glo Color Corp.) between the 1930s and 1950s
- Rachel Carson's book Silent Spring, published in 1962

=== 2013 ===
- The Mellon Institute of Industrial Research at Carnegie Mellon University in Pittsburgh, Pennsylvania, established in 1913 by Andrew W. Mellon and Richard B. Mellon to conduct scientific research and train industrial researchers
- The R. B. Wetherill Laboratory of Chemistry at Purdue University in West Lafayette, Indiana, constructed between 1928 and 1955 to house the university's Department of Chemistry
- Research in the area of flavor chemistry and advances in analytical chemistry conducted at the USDA-ARS Western Regional Research Center from the 1940s

=== 2014 ===
- Thomas Edison's work in chemistry, including the development of carbon filaments and the nickel-iron battery and research into domestic sources of rubber at the Thomas Edison National Historical Park in West Orange, New Jersey, The Henry Ford in Dearborn, Michigan, and the Edison and Ford Winter Estates in Fort Myers, Florida.
- Izaak Maurits Kolthoff's role in establishing the modern discipline of analytical chemistry at the University of Minnesota in Minneapolis, Minnesota.
- The research and professional contributions of Rachel Holloway Lloyd, the first American woman to receive a Ph.D. in chemistry (awarded by the University of Zurich in 1887), at the University of Nebraska–Lincoln where she taught.

=== 2015 ===
- The Keeling Curve, a record of atmospheric carbon dioxide levels initiated in 1958 by Charles David Keeling of the Scripps Institution of Oceanography at the University of California, San Diego, with samples taken at the National Oceanic and Atmospheric Administration's Mauna Loa Observatory in Hilo, Hawaii.
- William Kelly's pneumatic iron refining process, patented in 1857, at the Lyon County Public Library in Eddyville, Kentucky, and at Murray State University in Murray, Kentucky.
- Edwin H. Land's invention of instant photography (also known by the company's name, Polaroid), at the former Polaroid Corporation Laboratory (now owned by the Massachusetts Institute of Technology) in Cambridge, Massachusetts.
- The discovery and isolation of phytochrome, a photoreceptive pigment in plants that controls their germination, growth, and flowering. Phytochrome was isolated in 1959 at the U.S. Department of Agriculture's Beltsville Area Research Center in Beltsville, Maryland.

=== 2016 ===
- Willard Libby's discovery of radiocarbon dating at the University of Chicago.
- Merck & Co.'s research on The Vitamin B Complex
- The discovery of Ivermectin

=== 2017 ===
- Infrared Spectrometer and the Exploration of Mars
- Chlorofluorocarbons and Ozone Depletion

=== 2018 ===
- Plutonium-238 Production for Space Exploration

=== 2019 ===
- St. Elmo Brady, the First African-American Ph.D. in Chemistry
- Steroid Medicines and Upjohn Innovation
- The creation of Gas Chromatography-Mass Spectrometry

=== 2021 ===
- The foundation of the petrochemical industry by Union Carbide
- Saul Hertz and the Medical Uses of Radioiodine
