= Friedman School of Nutrition Science and Policy =

School of Tufts University

Coordinates: 42.34950°N 71.06188°W

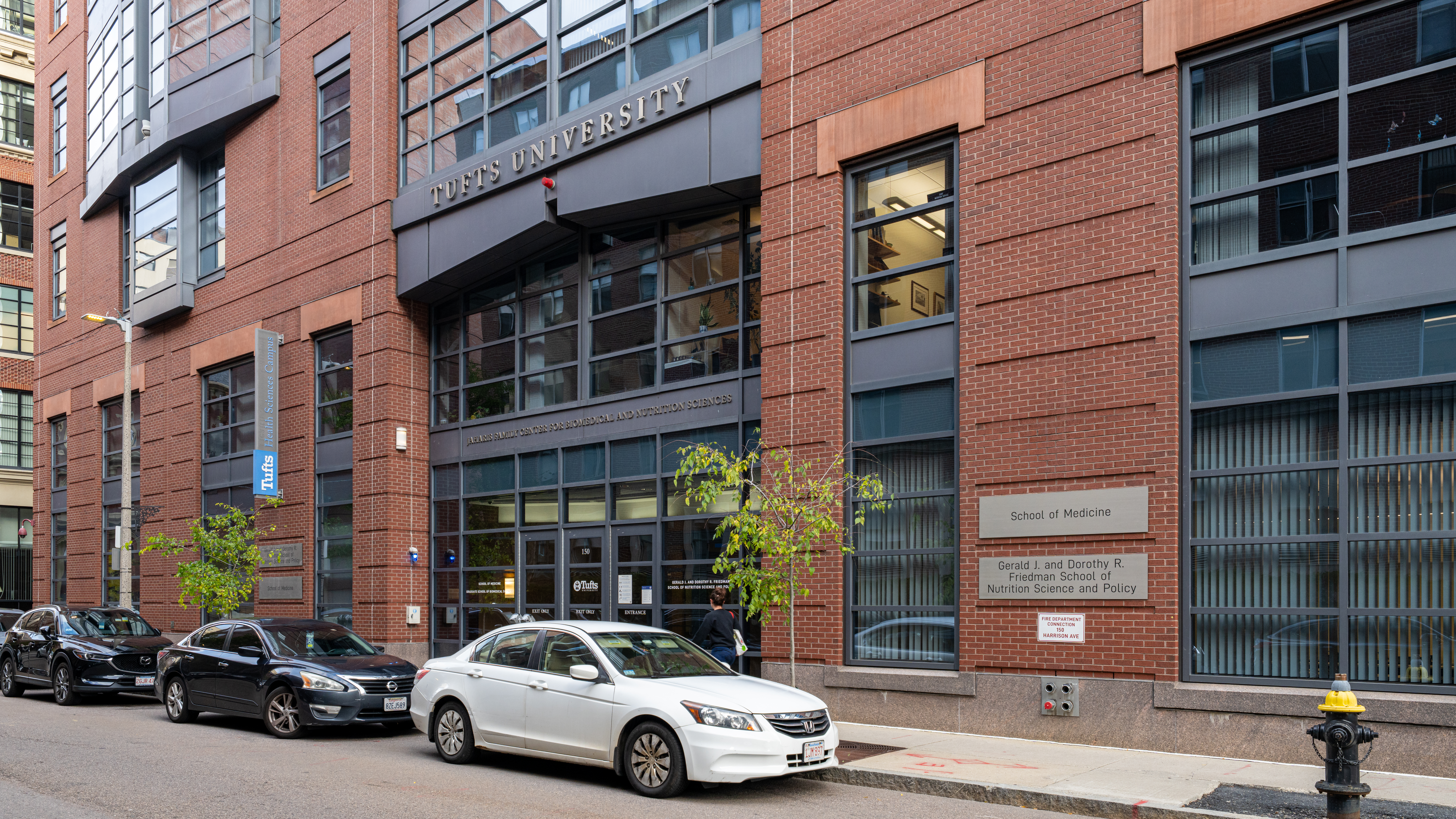
- Motto: Pax et Lux (Peace and Light)
- Type: Private
- Established: 1981
- Dean: Christina Economos
- Location: Boston, Massachusetts, U.S.
- Campus: Urban
- Colors: Brown, Blue
- Website: nutrition.tufts.edu

The Gerald J. and Dorothy R. Friedman School of Nutrition Science and Policy (also called the Friedman School) at Tufts University brings together biomedical, nutritional, clinical, social, economic and behavioral scientists to conduct research, educational, and community service programs in the field of human nutrition. Founded in 1981, the school's mission is to generate trusted science, educate future leaders, and produce real world impact in nutrition science and policy.

The Friedman School is one of the eight schools that currently comprise Tufts University. Although originally split between the university's Medford/Somerville campus and the health sciences campus in Boston, almost all of the school's facilities and programs now share the health sciences campus with the School of Medicine and the School of Dental Medicine. The Jaharis Family Center for Biomedical and Nutrition Research, which opened in 2002, houses most of the nutrition school. The school currently enrolls over 200 masters and doctoral students.

== Faculty and students ==
Faculty at the school include biomedical, social and environmental scientists concerned with the supply and use of food in human nutrition, health and wellbeing. Many Friedman School faculty members hold a dual appointment at the Jean Mayer Human Nutrition Research Center on Aging. Supported by the USDA Agricultural Research Service, the HNRCA is the largest research institution in the world devoted to investigating the relationship between nutrition and aging.

Student specializations for M.S. and Ph.D. degrees include agriculture and the environment, biochemical and molecular nutrition, communication, community interventions and behavior change, data analytics and AI, entrepreneurship and innovation, epidemiology and public health, policy and economics, and humanitarian assistance among others. Graduates are employed in government agencies, nonprofit organizations, and food enterprises throughout the world and in the United States.

== Leadership ==
The Friedman School is under the supervision of a dean, appointed by the president and the provost, with the approval of the Trustees of Tufts College (the university's governing board). The dean has responsibility for the overall administration of the school, including faculty appointments, curriculum, admissions and financial aid, student affairs, development, and facilities.

Christina Economos was appointed dean on July 1, 2023. Building on her long career at the Friedman School, she launched a growth and sustainability plan to bring new students and faculty to the school, supported in part by a $10 million donation for student scholarships.

The previous dean was Dariush Mozaffarian, a cardiologist who founded Tufts University's Food is Medicine Institute in 2024.
