= Western Regional Research Center =

Regional laboratory within the Agricultural Research Service

- Field of research: Agriculture
- Director: Dr. Tara McHugh
- Address: 800 Buchanan Street
- Location: Albany, California
- Nickname: WRRC
- Operating agency: United States Department of Agriculture, Agricultural Research Service
- Website: Western Regional Research Center

The Western Regional Research Center (WRRC), located in Albany, California, is one of four regional laboratories within the Agricultural Research Service of the United States Department of Agriculture. The WRRC has six research units, which conduct research into food production, processing, safety, bioproducts and invasive species control.

== History ==
The Western Regional Research Center (originally named Western Regional Research Laboratory) was established following the passage of the Agricultural Adjustment Act of 1938 that created scientific research centers in the nation's four major crop-growing centers. The others are the Eastern Regional Research Center in Wyndmoor, Pennsylvania, the Southern Regional Research Center in New Orleans, Louisiana, and the Northern Regional Research Center (now National Center for Agricultural Utilization Research) in Peoria, Illinois. Groundbreaking for the WRRC took place in June 1939, and the building was occupied beginning in 1940.

== Organization ==
There are currently six research units of the WRRC:

- Bioproducts Research: expanding use of crops by developing biobased products and biofuels
- Crop Improvement and Genetics Research: enhance productivity and value of food and biofuel crops
- Exotic and Invasive Weeds Research: develop and transfer biologically based approaches to invasive weed management
- Foodborne Toxin Prevention and Detection: enhance food safety and biosecurity by developing methods for analysis, prevention and elimination of toxins
- Healthy Processed Foods Research: enhance the healthfulness and marketability of foods
- Produce Safety and Microbiology Research: improving safety of the food supply through basic and applied research

== Awards and recognition ==
The WRRC was dedicated as a National Historic Chemical Landmark in 2002 for the development of time-temperature tolerance studies for frozen food production and in 2013 for developing flavor research methods and standards.

== See also ==
- United States Department of Agriculture (USDA)
- USDA Agricultural Research Service
- Eastern Regional Research Center
- Southern Regional Research Center
- National Center for Agricultural Utilization Research
