= Oregon Outback =

Coordinates: 42.7°N 119.6°W

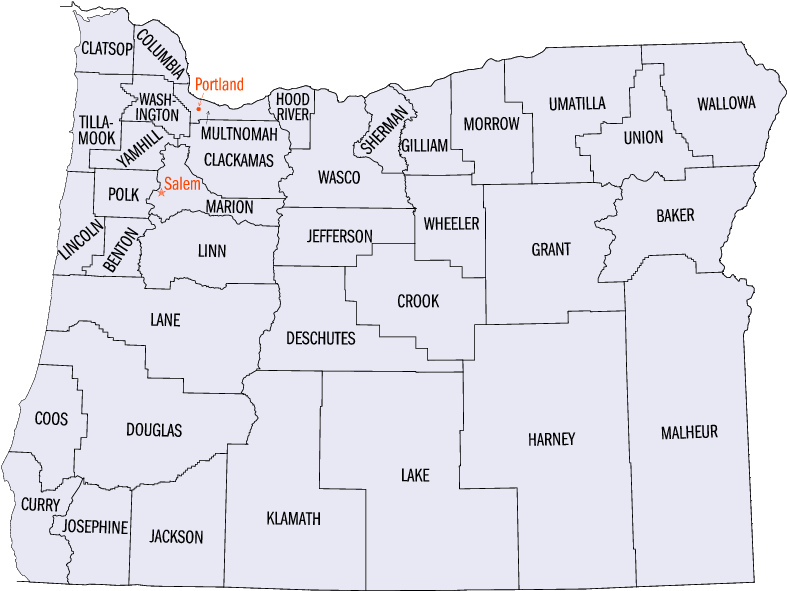
The Oregon Outback generally refers to the area in Lake, Klamath, Malheur and Harney counties

Oregon Outback is an unofficial term generally used to reference the high desert Basin and Range country of the central southern portion of the U.S. state of Oregon and covers most of Lake County, Klamath County, Malheur County, and Harney County.

The term is also used for a dark-sky preserve established in 2024 by DarkSky International.

== Climate ==
The region is arid with an average of about ten inches of annual rainfall, though some mountain areas may receive as much as thirty inches, mostly in the form of winter snow and summer thunderstorms. Winters are cold and windy with periodic snowfalls; spring brings warm days and cold nights with snow possible into late April. Summer is warm with cool nights and occasional thunderstorms, with fall bringing crisp weather that can be interrupted by snow as soon as late October.

== Topography ==
The region is a high desert plateau averaging roughly 4,000 feet (1,200 m) in elevation, periodically broken by sometimes massive fault-block mountains.

Notable fault blocks in the region are Abert Rim, Winter Ridge, Diablo Rim, Fish Creek Rim, Hart Mountain, and Poker Jim Ridge. Large lakes abound throughout the region as the streams of the Great Basin have no outlet to the sea and empty themselves on the basin floor. The Warner Lakes are the largest cluster of these shallow basin lakes. The lakes contain fish, notably crappie in the Warner Lakes, and host numerous bird species.

== Fauna ==
Mule Deer are one of the most common large mammals encountered in the Outback. Pronghorn are also a common species; in fact, the herd protected on the Hart Mountain National Antelope Refuge is one of the largest in North America. Another unique large mammal is the Kiger Mustang; these feral horses are direct descendants of Spanish mustangs that escaped from the conquistadors long ago in the southwest.

== Ownership ==
Much of the area is publicly owned, primarily under Bureau of Land Management (BLM) control. Some large areas are specially designated for protection, such as the Steens Mountain Wilderness complex, Hart Mountain National Antelope Refuge and the Malheur National Wildlife Refuge. Though access to most areas is readily available because the land is publicly owned, use is relatively light because of the extreme isolation of the land. A recent controversy involves the grazing of domestic livestock on public lands. A century-old practice, public grazing in many areas has recently led environmentalists to decry the practice as harmful to the fragile and unique desert ecosystems. In fact, this controversy led to the creation of the Steens Mountain Wilderness, which includes some of the only designated livestock-free zones in the nation.

== Counties ==
County Name	Population (2006)	Area
Harney	7,670	26,486 km² (10,226 mi²)
Klamath	65,455	15,892 km² (6,136 mi²)
Lake	7,540	21,648 km² (8,358 mi²)
Malheur	31,725	25,719 km² (9,930 mi²)

== Cities and towns ==
- Adel
- Chemult
- Chiloquin
- Christmas Valley
- Fields
- Fort Rock
- Frenchglen
- Klamath Falls
- Bly
- Lakeview
- Plush
- Silver Lake
- Summer Lake

== See also ==
- Outback Scenic Byway, a route that travels through the Oregon Outback
- Northern Great Basin Experimental Range
- Southern Oregon
- Central Oregon
- Southeastern Oregon
- Eastern Oregon
