= ERRC =

ERRC may refer to:

- Early Rain Reformed Church
- Eastern Regional Research Center
- European Roma Rights Centre
- FIA E-Rally Regularity Cup
- Expendability, Recoverability, Repairability Category as defined in AFMCI 23-101 of the United States Air Force
