= Simin Meydani =

Iranian-American nutritional scientist

Simin Nikbin Meydani
- Born: Tehran, Iran
- Education: University of Tehran Colorado State University Iowa State University
- Scientific career
- Fields: Nutrition, immunology, gerontology
- Workplaces: Tufts University

Simin Nikbin Meydani is an Iranian-American nutrition scientist and professor. Her research is focused on age-related changes in immune function and how nutrients influence immune and inflammatory responses. She is a Senior Scientist and Team Leader of the Nutritional Immunology Team at the Jean Mayer USDA Human Nutrition Research Center on Aging (HNRCA) at Tufts University and a Professor Emerita in Tufts’ Graduate School of Biomedical Sciences (GSBS). She directed the HNRCA from 2009 to 2016, then served as Tufts’ vice provost for research from 2016 to 2019.

== Education ==
Meydani was born in Tehran, Iran, where she attended Hadaf High School. She received her D.V.M. degree in Veterinary Medicine from University of Tehran in 1975, a master's degree in nutrition from Colorado State University in 1977 and a Doctor of Nutrition degree from Iowa State University in 1981.

== Career ==
Meydani was a Postdoctoral Research Fellow in Nutrition at the Harvard School of Public Health from 1981 to 1983 and then was appointed Senior Research Associate in the Department of Biology at Brandeis University from 1983 to 1984. She additionally earned a certificate in Molecular Immunology at the Marine Biological Laboratory, Woods Hole, MA in 1985.

In 1984, Meydani joined the Human Nutrition Research Center on Aging (HNRCA) at Tufts University, later becoming Lab Director of the Nutritional Immunology Laboratory in 1990. Over the ensuing decades she advanced through scientific leadership roles at the Center, becoming Associate Director in 2005 and serving as Director of the Jean Mayer USDA Human Nutrition Research Center on Aging from 2009 to 2023. During this period, she also held academic appointments at Tufts University’s Friedman School of Nutrition Science and Policy (Assistant Professor from 1984, Associate Professor from 1989, and Professor of Nutrition from 1994) and at the Sackler Graduate School of Biomedical Sciences, where she has been Professor of Immunology since 1996. She was also a Hedwig van Amerigen Executive Leadership fellow in the Academic Medicine Program at Drexel University College of Medicine in Philadelphia, PA in 2006.

Meydani was named the Vice Provost for research at Tufts University in September 2016, a role she held through 2019, serving on the Tufts University President’s Senior Staff and leading the university-wide Strategic Plan for Research and Scholarship. She was later named Emeritus Professor in 2023 and Research Professor at the Friedman School of Nutrition Science and Policy. In 2022, she founded VF24 Inc., a company developing plant-based, evidence-informed nutritional solutions targeting obesity and healthy aging.

== Research fields ==
According to her profile at Tufts, her scientific interests include the impact of nutrition on the aging process and age-associated diseases; role of nutrition on immune and inflammatory responses and predisposition to infectious diseases in developed and less developed countries.

== Awards and recognitions ==
=== Awards ===
- Iowa State University, Distinguished Alumni Achievement Award, 2013
- Helen LeBaron Hilton Distinguished Alumni Award, Iowa State University, 2011
- Food Science and Human Nutrition Alumni Impact Award, Iowa State University, 2011
- Robert H. Herman Award in Clinical Nutrition, American Society of Nutrition, 2008
- Denham Harman Life Time Research Achievement Award, American Aging Association, 2003
- Grace Goldsmith Award. American College of Nutrition, 2001
- American Institute of Nutrition Lederle Award in Human Nutrition, 1998
- Tufts University Faculty Recognition for Outstanding Achievement (1995–96, 1997–1998)
- International Nutritional Immunology Group Award, 1993
- International HERMES Vitamin Research Award, 1993
- Denham Harman Lecture Award of American College of Advancement in Medicine, 1990
- USDA-ARS Citation of Merit for manuscript "Vitamin E Enhances Cell-Mediated Immunity in Healthy Elderly Subjects," Meydani et al., Am J Clin Nutr 52:557-563, 1990."
- Pahlavi Royal Gold Medal for outstanding Tehran University college graduate, 1975
- Alborz Institute Award as valedictorian of Tehran University Veterinary School class, 1975

=== Honors ===
- American Society for Nutrition, Class of 2019 Fellows
- 2012-13 Vice-President elect, American Society for Nutrition, President 2014
- Jean Andrews Centennial Visiting Professorship, University of Texas, Austin, Texas, 2010
- Hedwig van Amerigen Executive Leadership in Academic Medicine Program (Drexel University College of Medicine), 2005-2006
- President, American Aging Association, 2005-2006
- Malcolm Trout Annual Visiting Scholar. Michigan State University, 2001
- Welcome Visiting Professorship, Iowa State University, 1998

=== Other activities ===
- Co-chair and Organizer, FASEB Summer Conference on Nutrition and Immune Response, 2003, 2007, 2011
- Co-organizer, Women in Science & Medicine Symposium for American Society for Nutrition at Experimental Biology 2010, Anaheim, California.
- Chair, Tufts Women in Science, Engineering and Medicine Symposium, 2008, Boston, MA
- Organizer and Chair: Aging: Mechanism and Prevention: 35th Annual Meeting of AGE, Boston, June 2006.
- Organizing Committee, First and Second International Aging and Immunology Meeting, 1998, 2001
- Chair and Organizing Committee, International Life Sciences Institute Conference on Nutrition and Immunity, 1997

=== Professional affiliations ===
- American Society of Nutrition, Vice President-Elect
- American Aging Association, Board Member
- American College of Nutrition, Chair, Council on Immunology, Hematology, and Oncology

=== Selected publications ===
Select recent publications include:

- Guo W, Shukitt-Hale B, Wu D, Li L, Meydani SN. Dietary fruits and vegetables mitigate cognitive impairment in mice with high-fat diet-induced obesity: A pilot study. Nutr Neurosci. 2025.
- Guo W, Wu D, Li L, Lewis ED, Meydani SN. Increased Fruit and Vegetable Consumption Prevents Dysregulated Immune and Inflammatory Responses in High-Fat Diet-Induced Obese Mice. J Nutr. 2024 Oct;154(10):3144-3150.
- Ortega, EF, Wu, D, Guo, W, Meyani, SN, Panda, A. Study protocol for a zinc intervention in the elderly for prevention of pneumonia (ZIPP), a randomized placebo-controlled, double-blind clinical pilot trial. Frontiers in Nutrition 2024; 11.
- Sen, S, Cherkerzian, S, Herlihy, M, Hacker, M, Mcelrath, T, Cantonwine, D, Fichorova, R, and Meydani, S. Supplementation with Antioxidant Micronutrients in Pregnant Women with Obesity: A Randomized Controlled Trial. International J. Obesity 2024: 10.1038/s41366-024-01472-z. PMID 38396126
- Guo, W, Ortega, EF, Wu, D, Ki, L, Bronson, RT, Boehm, SK, Meydani, SN. Life-long consumption of high level of fruits and vegetables reduces tumor incidence and extends median lifespan in mice. Front. Nutr. Front. Nutr. 2023;10 – 10.
- Calder PC, Bach-Faig A, Bevacqua T, Caballero Lopez CG, Chen ZY, Connolly D, Koay WL, Meydani SN, Pinar AS, Ribas-Filho D, Pierre A. Vital role for primary healthcare providers: urgent need to educate the community about daily nutritional self-care to support immune function and maintain health. BMJ Nutr Prev Health. 2023 Dec 6;6(2):392-401.
- Lewis, ED, Ortega, EF, Dao, Barger, K, Mason, Leong, JB, Osburne, MS, Magoun, L, Nepveux, FJ, Athar H. Chishti, AH, Schwake, C, Quynh, A, Gilhooly, CH, Petty, G, Guo, W, Matuszek, G, Pereira, D, Reddy, M, Wang, JM Wu, W, Meydani, SN, Combs, J F. Safe and effective delivery of supplemental iron to healthy adults: a two-phase, randomized, double-blind trial – the safe iron study. Front. Nutr., 2023; 10, 1-19.

Her most cited papers are

- Meydani S, Meydani M, Blumberg JB, et al. "Vitamin E Supplementation and In Vivo Immune Response in Healthy Elderly Subjects: A Randomized Controlled Trial". JAMA. 1997; 277(17):1380-1386. doi:10.1001/jama.1997.03540410058031 (cited by 560 articles in Google Scholar)
- S N Meydani, et al. "Vitamin E supplementation enhances cell-mediated immunity in healthy elderly subjects. " American Journal of Clinical Nutrition September 1990 vol. 52 no. 3 557-563
- Meydani, S N; et al. (1991). "Oral (n-3) fatty acid supplementation suppresses cytokine production and lymphocyte proliferation: comparison between young and older women". Journal of Nutrition. 121 (4): 547–555. doi:10.1093/jn/121.4.547. PMID 2007907.
