= National Interagency Confederation for Biological Research =

United States interagency governmental collaboration focused on bioterrorism

The National Interagency Confederation for Biological Research (NICBR, pronounced "Nick Burr") is a biotechnology and biodefense partnership and collaborative environment of eight U.S. federal government agencies through the National Interagency Biodefense Campus (NIBC) at Fort Detrick, Maryland. NICBR was created in the wake of the September 11 attacks and the 2001 anthrax attacks as a way to bring a whole-of-government approach to addressing bioterrorism threats. Before this, countering biological weapons fell to the Department of Defense (DoD) and focused on protection of troops in the field.

== Structure ==
Four federal cabinet level departments are represented in the NICBR across eight agencies:

- DHHS
  - National Cancer Institute (NCI)
  - National Institute of Allergy and Infectious Diseases (NIAID)
  - Centers for Disease Control and Prevention (CDC)
  - U.S. Food and Drug Administration (FDA)
- DoD
  - United States Army Medical Research and Development Command (USAMRDC)
  - Naval Medical Research Center (NMRC)
- USDA
  - Agricultural Research Service
- DHS
  - National Biodefense Analysis and Countermeasures Center (NBACC)

Some NICBR laboratories are physically consolidated on the National Interagency Biodefense Campus (NIBC) which includes all NICBR partners except NCI, which maintains its own campus on the Rosemont Avenue side of Fort Detrick. The Fort Detrick Interagency Coordinating Committee (FDICC) is the central hub of the NICBR governance structure, which is chaired by the Fort Detrick U.S. Army garrison commander. It is composed of all NICBR partner representatives.

== Leadership and personnel ==
The FDICC meets twice a month and reports to the Executive Steering Committee (ESC), which is chaired by the commander, U. S. Army Medical Research and Materiel Command and is composed of equivalents across the partner agencies. The ESC reports to the NICBR Board of Directors (BOD), consisting of the chair, currently Army Surgeon General, and her equivalents across the partnership. Collectively, the NICBR governance bodies provide strategic direction and oversight.

=== Working groups and subcommittees ===
Reporting to the FDICC are seven subcommittees and three working groups:

- The Sustainment Subcommittee
- The Financial and Business Planning Subcommittee
- The Public Affairs and Community Relations Subcommittee (PACRS)
  - The Educational Outreach Working Group (reporting through the PACRS)
- The Security Subcommittee
- The Information Management & Information Technology Subcommittee
- The Safety & Occupational Health Subcommittee (SOH)
  - The Medical Directors Working Group (reporting through the SOH)
- The Scientific Interaction Subcommittee (SIS)
  - The Select Agent Program Working Group (reporting through the SIS)

The NICBR Partnership Office (NPO) provides a staffing function and coordinating center for and under the direction of the FDICC. The NPO works closely with the subcommittees and working groups to facilitate execution of their individual charters and action items handed down by the governance bodies.
