= Eastern Regional Research Center =

Lab center in Pennsylvania, US

Coordinates: 40°04′58″N 75°11′31″W

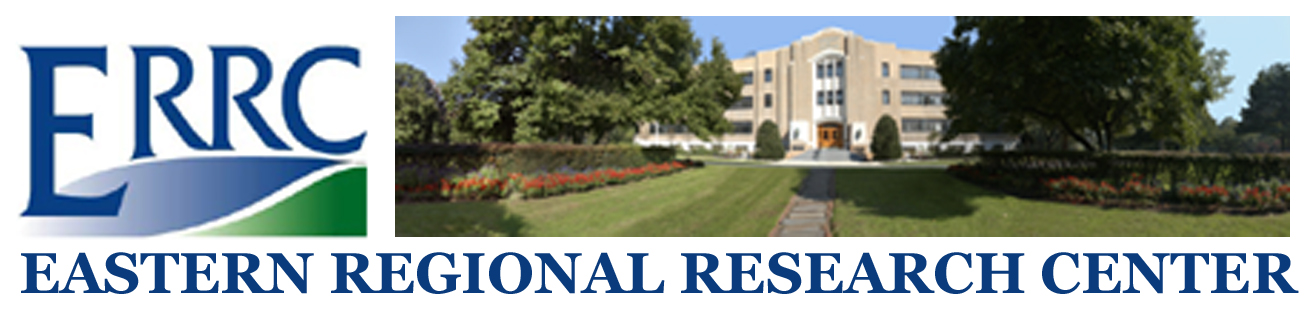

Agency overview
- Jurisdiction: United States
- Headquarters: Wyndmoor, Pennsylvania
- Website: ars.usda.gov/northeast-area/wyndmoor-pa/eastern-regional-research-center

The Eastern Regional Research Center (ERRC) is a USDA laboratory center in Wyndmoor, Pennsylvania. The Center researches new industrial and food uses for agricultural commodities, develops new technology to improve environmental quality, and provides technical support to federal regulatory and action agencies.

With about 213,317 sq ft (19,817.8 m^{2}) of floor space, ERRC is the second-largest research center of the Agricultural Research Service (ARS).

== History ==
ERRC was one of four regional labs set up by the Agricultural Adjustment Act of 1938, when Wyndmoor, Pennsylvania was chosen to host this facility, named the Eastern Regional Research Center. The other regional labs set up by the 1938 act are located in Peoria, Illinois (National Center for Agricultural Utilization Research), New Orleans, Louisiana (Southern Regional Research Center), and Albany, California (Western Regional Research Center).

=== Landmark designation ===
The American Chemical Society designated the research on food dehydration processes at the Eastern Regional Research Center as a National Historic Chemical Landmark in a ceremony in Wyndmoor, Pennsylvania, on April 18, 2007. The plaque commemorating the event reads:

"Chemists, chemical engineers, and food technologists at the Eastern Regional Research Center developed innovative dehydration technologies, most notably the potato flake process and explosion puffing. These technologies created opportunities for the development of novel, high-quality convenience foods and food ingredients for domestic and global markets. Instant mashed potatoes and formulated potato crisps, both made from potato flakes, are among the most popular and recognizable food products ever created. These food dehydration technologies increased U.S. potato production and utilization, provided key products for food aid programs, and made a lasting and significant impact on the ways in which foods are processed worldwide."
