= Southeastern Oregon =

Region in United States of America

Coordinates: 43°N 118°W

Map of Southeastern Oregon

Southeastern Oregon is a geographical term for the area along the borders of the U.S. state of Oregon with Idaho, California, and Nevada. It includes the populous areas of Burns, Klamath Falls and Lakeview. The region is also known by its nickname of the Oregon Outback.

== Counties ==
County Name	Population (2006)	Area
Harney	7,670	10,226 mi^{2} (26,486 km^{2})
Klamath	65,455	15,892 km^{2} (6,136 mi^{2})
Lake	7,540	21,648 km^{2} (8,358 mi^{2})
Malheur	31,725	25,719 km^{2} (9,930 mi^{2})

== Cities and towns ==
- Burns
- Chemult
- Chiloquin
- Christmas Valley
- Drewsey
- Fort Rock
- Frenchglen
- Keno
- Klamath Falls
- Lakeview
- Nyssa
- Ontario
- Paisley
- Riley
- Silver Lake
- Summer Lake
- Vale

== See also ==
- Oregon Outback
- Harney Basin
