= Hadaf Educational Group =

Private educational complex in Tehran, Iran

Hadaf Educational Group گروه فرهنگی هدف
- Native name: Goruh-e Farhangi-e Hadaf
- Company type: Joint-stock company, private school
- Industry: Education
- Founded: 1949 in Tehran, Iran
- Founders: Ahmad Birashk; Ahmad Anwari; Taqi Hurfar; Ali Motemadden; Ahmad Reza Qoli-Zade
- Defunct: 1979; 47 years ago
- Fate: Termination of private schools during the Iranian Revolution
- Area served: Iran

Hadaf Educational Group (Persian: گروه فرهنگی هدف, "Goruh-e Farhangi-e Hadaf") was a pioneering private educational complex, founded in Tehran in 1949. The founders include Ahmad Birashk, and a number of well-known high school teachers of mathematics and natural sciences, including Ahmad Anwari, Taqi Hurfar, Ali Motemadden and Ahmad Reza Qoli-Zade.

== History ==
The name Hadaf (English: goal) also served as an acronym in Persian for honar (art); danesh (science), and farhang (culture). The main objective of the Group was to offer high quality education from elementary to high school, comparable to that of American preparatory schools.

Hadaf's first boys' high school (Dabirestan-e yak-e pesaran-e Hadaf) was established in 1951. In 1955 three new schools were added: a girls' high school, a boys elementary school and another elementary school for girls. By 1974 Hadaf schools were expanded to 12 elementary, intermediary, and high schools for boys and girls, including a coed primary school with a total of 3,524 students. In 1974, when the government initiated national mandatory free education for all students from primary to the end of intermediary grades (8th grade), three elementary and four intermediary schools of the Hadaf Group were transferred to the public school system. From 1951 to 1976, a total of 15,588 students had graduated from Hadaf high schools: 8,596 in mathematics branch, 6,960 in natural sciences, and only 32 in humanities. The overwhelming majority of Hadaf graduates continued their higher education either in leading Persian universities or in American and European institutions of higher education.

Hadaf high schools were equipped with libraries and labs for physics, chemistry, and biology as well as workshops for photography, painting, calligraphy, carpentry, mechanics, auto mechanics, and ironsmith works. The first Hadaf high school also hosted a natural science museum.

The success of the Hadaf Group encouraged the formation of two other educational complexes in the 1950s, Goruh-e Farhangi-e Kharazmi and Goruh-e Farhangi-e Azar. In 1959, the Hadaf Group initiated the formation of the Association of Private Prep Schools (Anjoman-e melli-e madares-e hamahang) consisting of the above educational complexes along with 12 private schools aimed at promoting their common goals. In 1970 the Hadaf, Adar, and Kharazmi educational groups formed a teacher training program for the new intermediary schools, which were introduced into the educational system in 1971. That same year Hadaf also initiated, with the cooperation of the Adar and Kharazmi groups, in the formation of two well equipped vocational centers, to offer introductory vocational courses with 12 workshops in each unit.

=== Hadaf Group stock ===
Hadaf Group was formed as a joint stock enterprise with a starting capital of 350,000 rials ($5,000.00) in 1950, of which 270,000 was provided from the revenues of evening courses offered from 1948 to 1950 and the remaining was given by the founders and other shareholders. Although the property of the Hadaf Group belonged to the shareholders, annual revenues were often invested for the establishment of new schools, construction of new buildings, and expansion of labs and libraries. In 1979, when the group's activities were terminated and the government confiscated the complex, the group owed 88 mil. rials (c. $1 mil.) to the banks, but possessed over 15,000 square meters of real estate land and over 20,000 square meters of educational space at its disposal.

== Schools ==
The Hadaf No. 3 school is located in Tehran, specifically in the Absardar area of the city.

== Notable alumni ==
- Simin Meydani, Iranian-American nutrition scientist, professor, university Vice Provost
