= Dariush Mozaffarian =

American cardiologist and academic

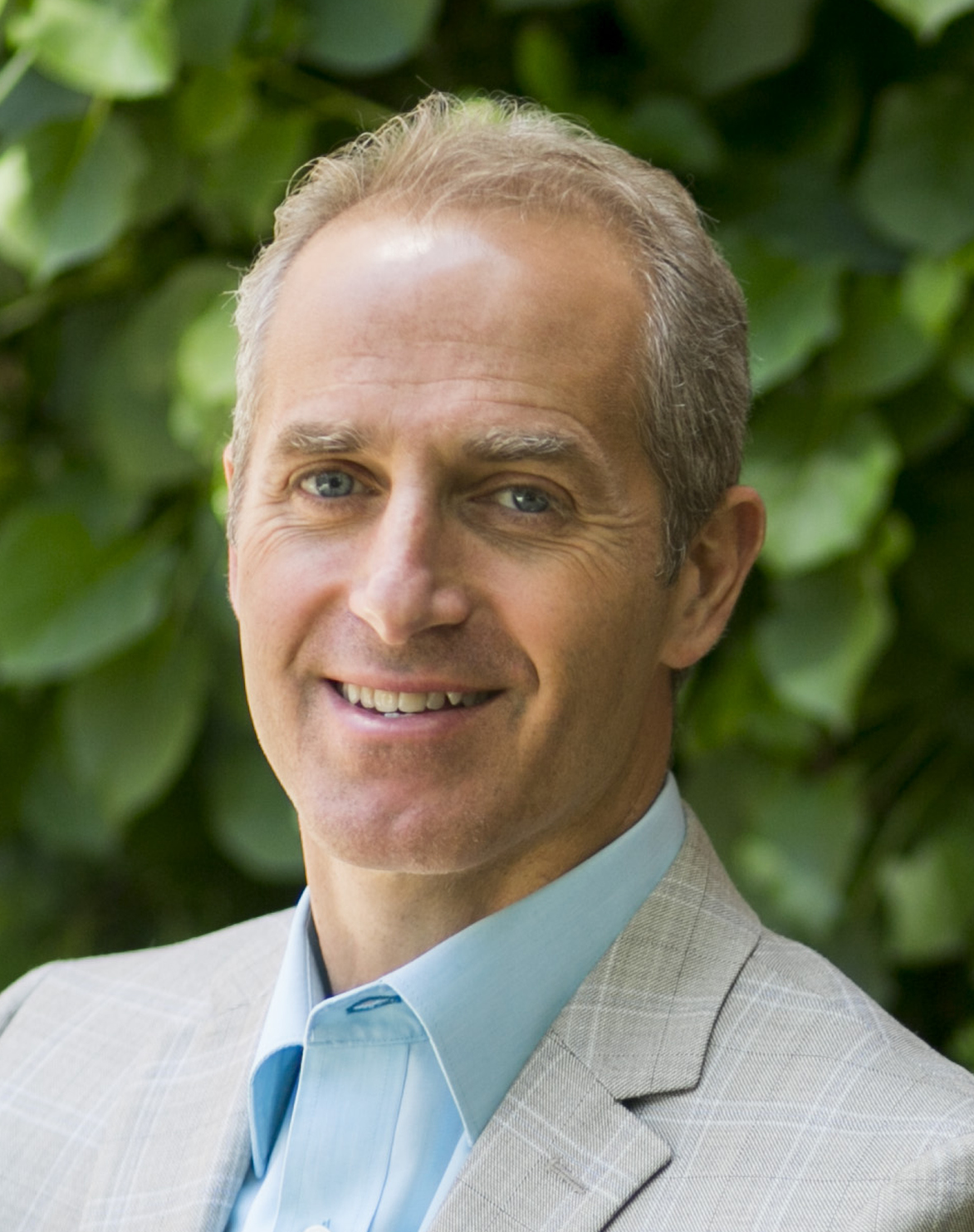
- Born: August 19, 1969 (age 56); Portland, Maine
- Education: Stanford; Columbia; University of Washington; Harvard
- Awards: The World's Most Influential Scientific Minds, Thomson Reuters, 2016; Chanchlani Global Health Award, McMaster University, 2017; Walker Prize, Museum of Science, Boston, 2018
- Scientific career
- Fields: nutrition, epidemiology, medicine, public health research
- Institutions: Harvard School of Public Health; Friedman School of Nutrition Science & Policy, Tufts University; Tufts University School of Medicine

Dariush Mozaffarian (born August 19, 1969) is a cardiologist, Jean Mayer Professor at the Friedman School of Nutrition Science and Policy at Tufts University, Professor of Medicine at Tufts School of Medicine, and an attending physician at Tufts Medical Center. He has authored publications on dietary priorities for obesity, diabetes, and cardiovascular diseases, as well as policy approaches to health in the US and globally.

== Education ==
Mozaffarian received a BS in biological sciences at Stanford University (Phi Beta Kappa) and MD at Columbia University (Alpha Omega Alpha). He took his residency at Stanford, and was a fellow in cardiovascular medicine at the University of Washington, where he also received a Master of Public Health degree. He earned a Doctorate in Public Health from Harvard.

== Academic career ==
Mozaffarian joined the faculty of the Harvard School of Public Health (HSPH) in 2006, where he later founded the school's program in Cardiovascular Epidemiology. From 2004 to 2007, he served as an adjunct faculty member at the Tufts University School of Medicine. Mozaffarian was an associate professor at HSPH, as well as an associate professor in the Division of Cardiovascular Medicine at Harvard Medical School and Brigham and Women’s Hospital.

On July 1, 2014, Mozaffarian became the Dean of Tufts University's Gerald J. and Dorothy R. Friedman School of Nutrition Science and Policy. He is the Jean Mayer Professor of Nutrition, and Professor of Medicine at Tufts University School of Medicine.

== Research ==
Mozaffarian is the author of over 500 scientific publications on dietary priorities for obesity, diabetes, and cardiovascular diseases, and on evidence-based policy approaches and innovations to reduce these burdens in the US and globally. Mozaffarian is the principal investigator of the Global Dietary Database, and Food-PRICE (Policy Review and Intervention Cost-Effectiveness). As well, he was selected to serve on advisory boards for the US and Canadian governments, American Heart Association, World Health Organization, and the United Nations.

In 2011, Mozaffarian published a study which found that the quality of one's diet is strongly associated with weight gain. The study also found that out of all the foods examined, potato chips were most strongly associated with weight gain. In 2014, Mozaffarian co-authored a controversial meta-analysis pertaining to the association between saturated fat consumption and risk of heart disease. Despite the meta-analysis's conclusion that the evidence "does not clearly support guidelines that encourage high consumption of polyunsaturated fatty acids and low consumption of total saturated fats," Mozaffarian told Science Insider that "Personally, I think the results suggest that fish and vegetable oils should be encouraged." In a 2018 paper published in the BMJ, Mozaffarian and co-author Nita G. Forouhi argued that "Nutrition science has often been criticized as unreliable, but has made vital contributions to human health" and that going forward, "All stakeholders, including the food industry, must be part of a collective effort to solve the tremendous global challenge of nutrition and health."

== Honors and awards ==
In 2016, Thomson Reuters named Mozaffarian as one of the World's Most Influential Scientific Minds. In 2018, Mozaffarian was awarded the Chanchlani Global Health Research Award by McMaster University. That same year, he was awarded the Walker Prize by the Museum of Science, Boston and was a Presidential Symposium Speaker for the American Society for Nutrition.

== Personal life ==
Mozaffarian and his wife have three children together. He also trains as a Fourth Degree Black Belt in Taekwondo.

== Selected publications ==
- The truth about vitamins and minerals : choosing the nutrients you need to stay healthy. Mozaffarian, Dariush., Harvard Medical School., Harvard Medical School. Health Publications Group. Boston, MA. 2012. ISBN 978-1-61401-014-2. OCLC 853679932.
- Mozaffarian, Dariush. (2014), Promoting heart-healthy eating to optimize cardiovascular nutrition., Health e Galaxy, OCLC 870687334
- Food Is Medicine : Healing Our Bodies, Nourishing Our Minds, and Transforming Our Food System. Mozaffarian, Dariush., Henry Holt and Company. New York, NY. 2026. ISBN 1250394287.
