= Southern Regional Research Center =

Agricultural research laboratory in New Orleans, Louisiana, US

United States Department of Agriculture Southern Regional Research Laboratory
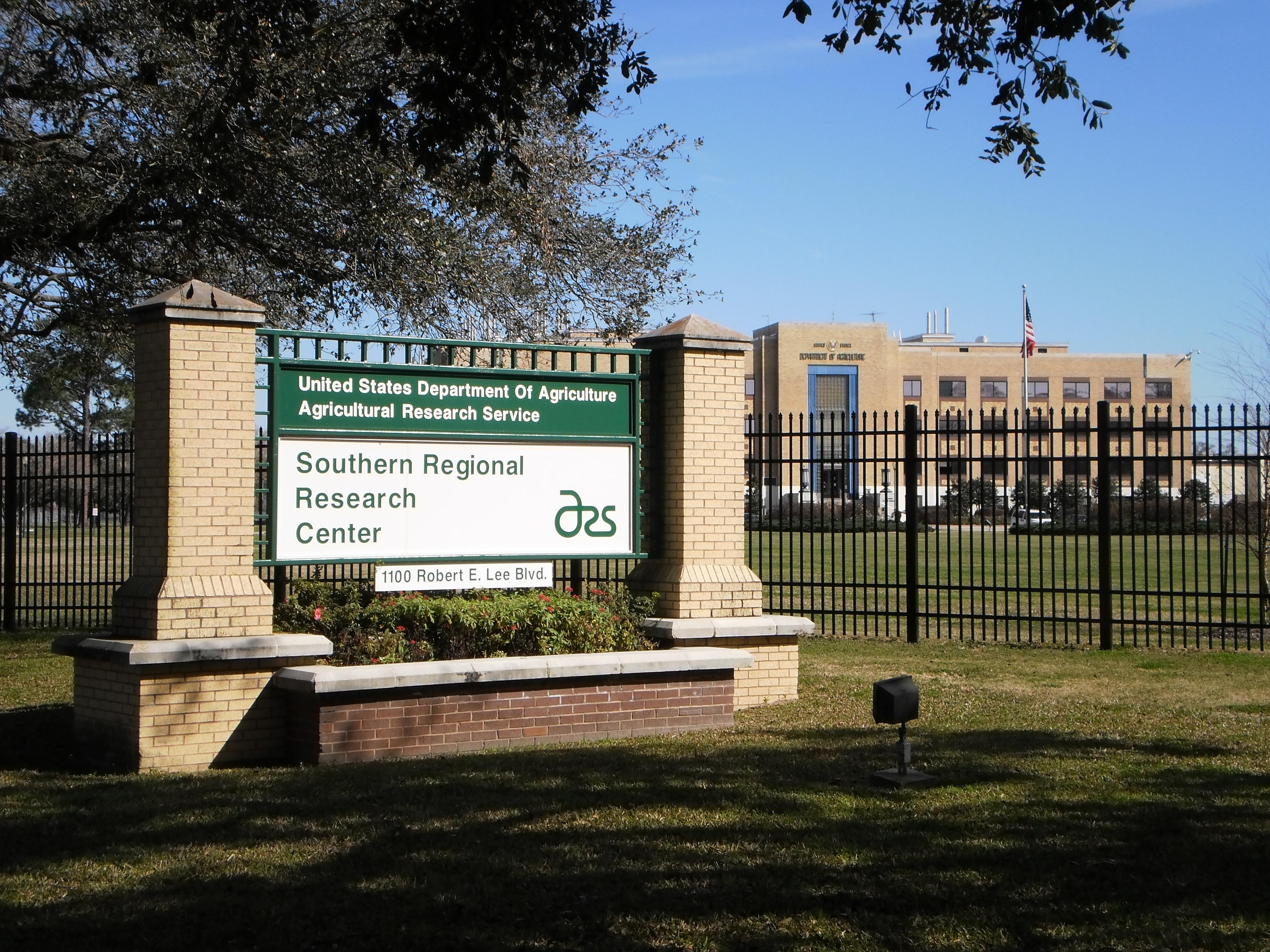
- USDA Southern Regional Research Center
- Established: 1941 by the United States Congress
- Research type: Agricultural and basic science
- Budget: US$21 million (2020)
- Director: Deepak Bhatnagar
- Staff: 130
- Location: New Orleans, Louisiana; 30.0183°N 90.0872°W
- Campus: 40 acres (16 ha)
- Operating agency: United States Department of Agriculture, Agricultural Research Service

The United States Department of Agriculture Southern Regional Research Center (SRRC) is one of four regional laboratories within the United States Department of Agriculture's Agricultural Research Service. Principal research areas of the SRRC include food safety, global food security, climate change, biofuels, agricultural sustainability, health and nutrition. It furthermore emphasizes improved product quality of natural fibers especially cotton, according to the SRRC's mission statement. The SRRC laboratory is located at 1100 Allen Toussaint Blvd, New Orleans, Louisiana 70124-4305 (Latitude 30.01881, Longitude -90.08952). It has an annual budget of approximately $25 million, employing 70 scientists and 130 other people in laboratory support roles.

The SRRC laboratory was established as a result of the Agricultural Adjustment Act of 1938 by the United States Congress. Construction on the laboratory commenced in 1939 at its current 40 acre (162,000 m^{2}) building site, a tract in the northeast corner of City Park on Allen Toussaint Boulevard near Bayou St. John, New Orleans, Louisiana. The laboratory opened in 1941. Research at the laboratory initially emphasized crops in the southern United States that were produced in surplus, especially cotton, sweet potato, and peanuts. The history of the laboratory is documented on-line by the United States Department of Agriculture's Agricultural Research Service. The laboratory was designated a National Historic Chemical Landmark in May 2004.

The other regional research centers in the Agricultural Research Service are: the Western Regional Research Center (WRRC) in Albany, California; the National Center for Agricultural Utilization Research (NCAUR) in Peoria, Illinois; and the Eastern Regional Research Center (ERRC) in Wyndmoor, Pennsylvania. Additionally SRRC has had affiliation with field stations.

The SRRC laboratory suffered $35 million in damage as a result of Hurricane Katrina. The laboratory was closed for the ensuing year, necessitating relocation of approximately 170 members of its staff. The laboratory restored full operation in August 2007, two years after the storm.

== Scientific achievements, discoveries, and inventions ==
The impact of the laboratory is gauged by its more than 8755 scientific publications and 1035 patents in its 70+ year history. Notable contributions include the discovery of the process for making durable press (permanent press) cotton for wrinkle-free garments. Particular contributions to this discovery came from Ruth R. Benerito, who invented a cross-linking chemical reaction of the cellulose molecules in cotton that imparts the permanent press characteristic on cotton garments.

Recognizing that sucrose, common table sugar, was in surplus, SRRC researchers demonstrated the chemical conversion of sucrose to certain sucrose esters and their use as emulsifiers, stabilizers, and texturizers in foods. Making use of surplus oilseed crops, SRRC researchers invented routes to acetoglycerides and their use as thin, stretchable films suitable for edible coatings in various food applications and non-food plasticizer applications.

SRRC researchers invented other improvements to cotton fabrics including imparting flame and heat resistance, antibacterial properties, oil resistance, and a stretchy version of cotton fabrics. They invented cotton tire cord and light-weighting tarpaulin materials by incorporating cotton into the materials. They improved printing processes for cotton textiles, as well as mechanical processing equipment for use by textile mills.

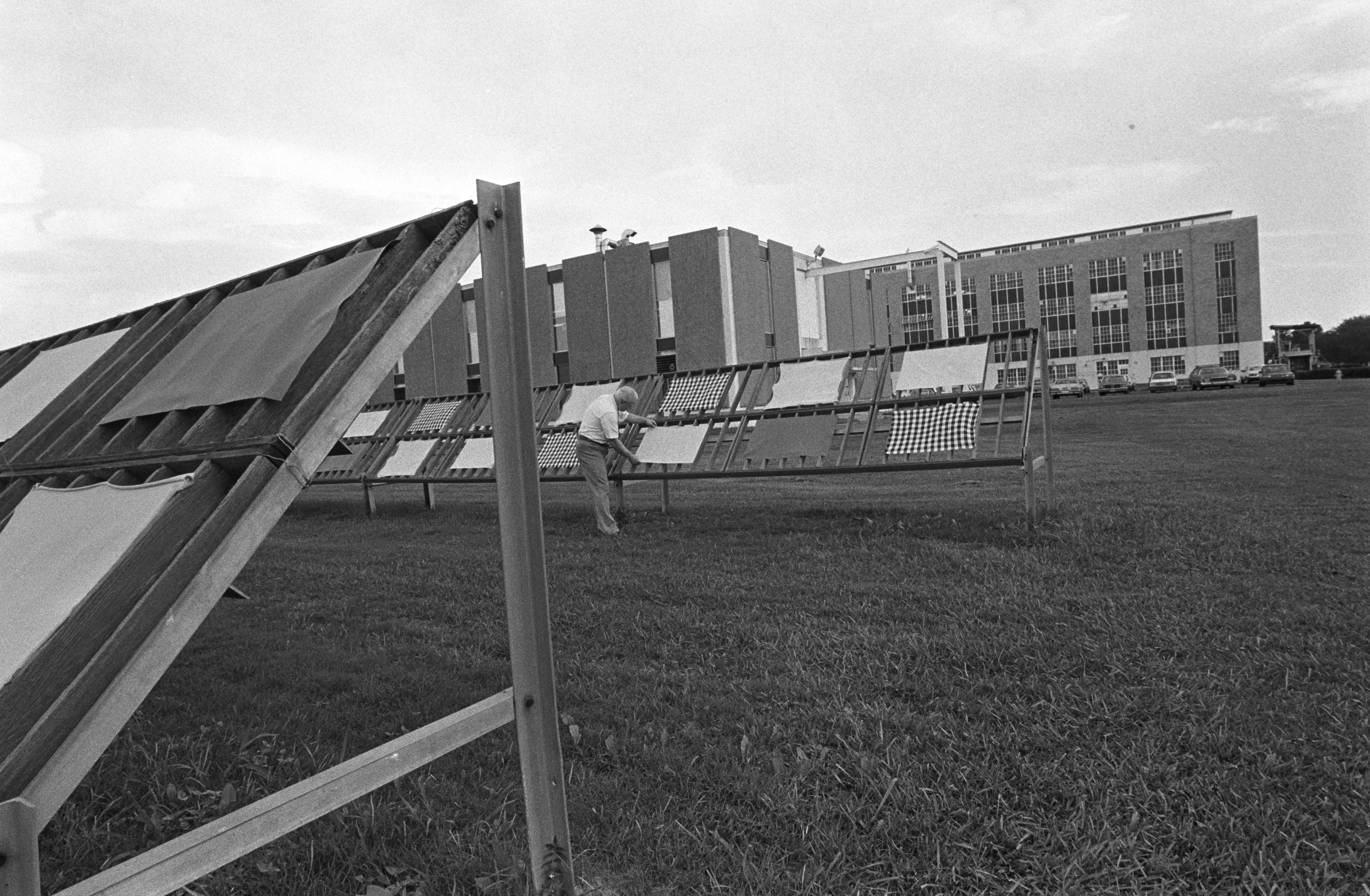
USDA Southern Regional Research Center New Orleans 1985 Drying Cotton Samples

Contributions of the laboratory to food safety include detection and detoxification of aflatoxin in cottonseed and peanuts, in addition to gossypol analysis of cottonseed. Inventions from the laboratory provided improved food quality and processed food quality. These inventions included high protein rice flour, edible rice bran oil, cottonseed oil with food characteristics similar to coconut butter, and fat sources for improved intravenous nutrition in medical settings. SRRC researchers found means of improving such processed foods as dehydrated celery, pickles, and new uses of sweet potatoes. They additional found improved uses of pine tree products, especially the practical applications of pine tar rosin. Improvements to synthetic rubber also came from SRRC laboratories. A more complete list of scientific contributions of the SRRC is available.

SRRC scientists Wilson A. Reeves, Stanley P. Rowland, Jett C. Arthur Jr., and Alfred D. French received in different years the Anselme Payen Award, administered by the American Chemical Society, for their contributions to the science and technology of cotton and cellulosic materials. Several prominent SRRC researchers are members of the Agricultural Research Service's Science Hall of Fame.
