= Ruth R. Benerito =

American scientist and inventor (1916–2013)

Ruth Mary Rogan Benerito
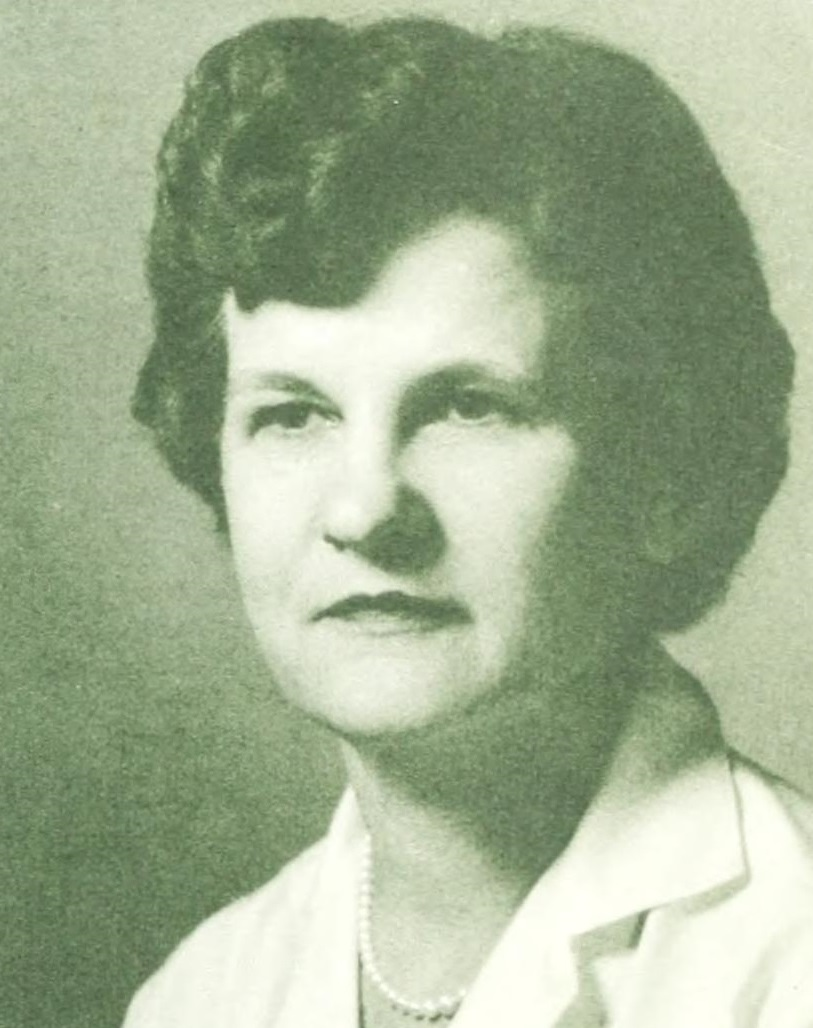
- Born: Ruth Mary Rogan; January 12, 1916; New Orleans, Louisiana, U.S.
- Died: October 5, 2013 (aged 97); Metairie, Louisiana, U.S.
- Education: Sophie Newcomb College, Tulane University
- Known for: Wrinkle-free fiber
- Spouse: Frank Benerito
- Awards: Garvan Medal, Lemelson-MIT Prize, National Inventors Hall of Fame
- Scientific career
- Fields: Physical chemistry of surfaces and colloids
- Workplaces: University of Chicago, USDA Southern Regional Research Center, Tulane University, University of New Orleans.
- Doctoral advisor: Thomas F. Young

Ruth Mary Rogan Benerito (January 12, 1916 – October 5, 2013) was an American physical chemist and inventor known for her impactful work related to the textile industry. She notably contributed to the development of wash-and-wear cotton fabrics using a technique called cross-linking, which strengthens the hydrogen bonds between cellulose molecules of cotton fibers. She held 55 patents.

== Personal life ==
Ruth Mary Rogan Benerito was born and raised in New Orleans in 1916. Her father, John Edward Rogan, was a civil engineer and railroad official and was described by his daughter as a pioneer in women's liberation movement. Her mother, Bernadette Elizardi Rogan, was an artist and considered a "truly liberated woman" by her daughter. Both parents were college graduates and imposed their values regarding a strong sense of education and women's rights onto Ruth.

The Great Depression era surrounded Ruth Benerito's early years and when she eventually received her B.S. in chemistry, one in five Americans was unemployed. Benerito's original interest preceding chemistry was math; however, she did not want to foster a career as an actuary simply estimating probabilities for insurance companies, which led her to study chemistry.

Benerito married Frank Penchot Benerito, who had served in World War II. Frank worked in the car business and fully supported his wife's research and hard work.

Later in her life as she reflected on her many achievements, the true essence of her character was illustrated when she said, "I believe that whatever success that I have attained is the result of many efforts of many people. My very personal success was built from the help and sacrifices of members of my family, and professional accomplishments resulted from the efforts of early teachers and the cooperativeness of colleagues too many to enumerate."

== Education ==
In an age when girls did not usually go on to higher education, her father made sure his daughters received the same education available to boys. Benerito completed high school at age 14 and entered Sophie Newcomb College, the women's college at Tulane University, at age 15 where she earned a degree in chemistry, as well as physics and math. She graduated in 1935 and moved to Bryn Mawr College to complete one year of graduate studies.

She then moved to Newcomb, where she taught chemistry while researching advanced quantitative analysis and physical chemistry, organic chemistry, kinetics, and thermodynamics. While working as a teacher, Benerito took night classes to earn her master's degree from Tulane University. In 1948 she received her doctorate degree from the University of Chicago, where she conducted physical chemical research under the direction of Thomas F. Young. Her Ph.D dissertation was titled "Activity Coefficients of HCl in Ternary Aqueous Solutions". She left her job as an assistant professor in Newcomb College in 1953 to work at the USDA Southern Regional Research Center of the US Department of Agriculture in New Orleans, where she spent most of her career.

At the USDA she worked in the Intravenous Fat Program of the OilSeed Laboratory, and in 1955 she was promoted to project leader. In 1958 she was promoted to acting head of the Colloid Cotton Chemical Laboratory, and in 1959 she became the research leader of the Physical Chemistry Research Group of the Cotton Reaction Laboratory. Benerito completed a postdoctoral fellowship in 1972 in biophysics at Tulane University. Still at Tulane, she was an adjunct professor from 1960 to 1981. During that time, she also worked as a lecturer at the University of New Orleans. In later years, while she was researching cotton fibers, Benerito taught classes part-time at Tulane University and at the University of New Orleans.

She retired from the USDA in 1986 but continued to teach part-time at Tulane and the University of New Orleans.

== Contribution ==
=== Invention of wrinkle-free cotton ===
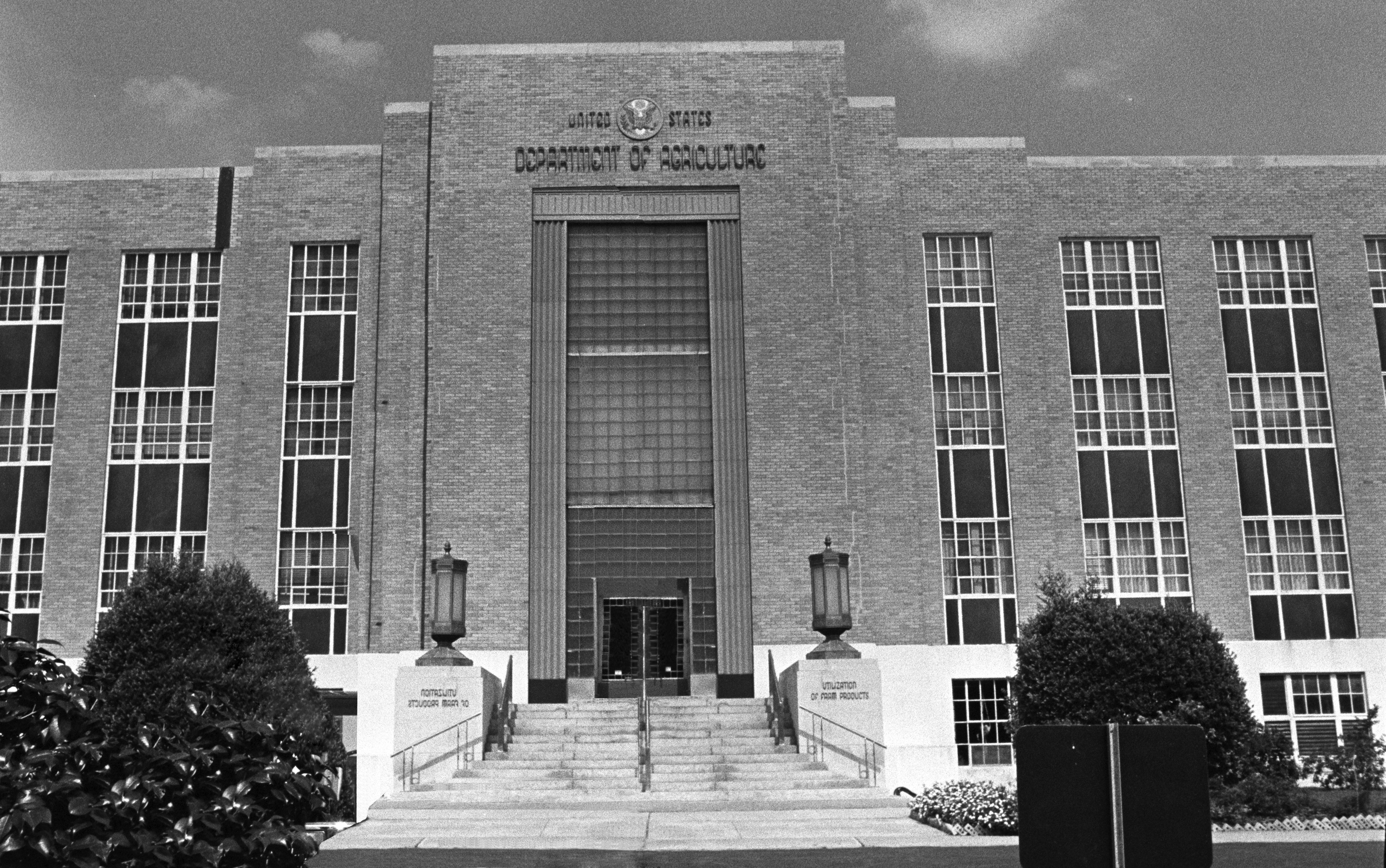
United States Department of Agriculture's Southern Regional Research Center in New Orleans, as seen in 1985, where Benerito invented wrinkle-resistant cotton textiles

Benerito is most famous for her work relating to the use of mono-basic acid chlorides in the production of cotton, with which she had 55 patents. She invented these wash-and-wear cotton fabrics, which allow for more wrinkle-free and durable clothing, while working at the U.S. Department of Agriculture (USDA) laboratories in New Orleans in the 1950s. In the southern United States, cotton was a major agricultural product that played a crucial role in everyday life. It was a key material in the production of various household items, including clothing, bed sheets, and table linens. However, a major issue with cotton items was how much they wrinkled after being washed. Before this innovation, a family needed considerable time to iron clothes. Benerito found a way to chemically treat the surface of cotton that led not only to wrinkle-resistant fabric but also to stain- and flame-resistant fabrics. The invention was said to have "saved the cotton industry."

While she is publicly credited for the invention of wrinkle-free fiber, she did not believe she singlehandedly invented it. She clarified her role in a 2004 USDA interview by stating, "I don't like it to be said that I invented wash-wear because there were any number of people worked on it and the various processes by which you give cotton those properties. No one person discovered it or is responsible for it, but I contributed to a new process of doing it."

The secret of the invention is the use of a process known as crosslinking. Cotton is composed of a natural polymeric material called cellulose. Like nylon and synthetic polyesters, cellulose is a polymer; that is, its molecules are shaped like long chains containing many thousands of atoms. The long, chainlike shape of the molecules is what makes cellulose, like nylon and polyester, a good fiber. Benerito discovered a way to treat cotton fibers so that the chainlike cellulose molecules were joined together chemically. This procedure is known as crosslinking, and it makes cotton resistant to wrinkling. Her innovation was discovering an additive that chemically attached to cellulose chains and smoothed the surface.

It was first thought that crosslinking was making the cotton fabric wrinkle resistant by strengthening its fibers, but the amount of crosslinking used in Benerito's treatment is small and does not add much strength. She developed a new theory on how crosslinking works. It is known that cellulose molecules can stick to each other by means of the weak hydrogen bonds between molecules. She proposed that one side effect of her crosslinking process was the strengthening of the hydrogen bonds, which made the material resistant to wrinkling.

=== Laboratory equipment ===
Benerito's research led to the development of glassy fibers that proved useful in the manufacture of laboratory equipment.

=== Method of feeding seriously wounded soldiers ===
Besides her contribution to the textile industry, during the Korean War, Benerito developed a way to give fat intravenously to patients who were too sick to eat—a method used to feed seriously wounded soldiers. The experiment looked into the proteins and fats in seeds like peanuts, almonds, and pistachios. The goal was to find a way to feed these fats directly into the patient's veins to provide them high-calorie nutrition for their physical activities. This method saved many lives.

== Awards ==
- 1964 USDA Distinguished Service Award
- 1968 Federal Woman Award
- 1968 Southern Chemist Award
- 1970 Garvan Medal
- 1971 Southwest Regional Award of American Chemical Society
- 1971 Agriculture Department's Distinguished Service Award
- 1972 Southwest Regional Award
- 1981 Honorary degree, Tulane University
- 1984 Woman of Achievement at World's Fair
- 2002 Lemelson-MIT Lifetime Achievement Award
- 2008 National Inventors Hall of Fame induction
