= National Center for Agricultural Utilization Research =

US research laboratory

Coordinates: 40°42′35″N 89°36′51″W

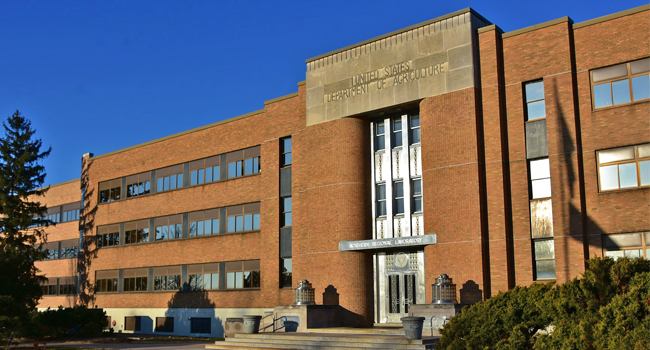
- NRRL building in Peoria, Illinois
- Nickname: NCAUR
- Field of research: Agriculture
- Director: Dr. Todd Ward
- Location: 1815 N. University St., Peoria, IL
- Operating agency: United States Department of Agriculture, Agricultural Research Service
- Website: National Center for Agricultural Utilization Research

The National Center for Agricultural Utilization Research (NCAUR) (sometimes still called the Northern Lab; known locally as the Ag Lab) is a United States Department of Agriculture laboratory center in Peoria, Illinois. The Center researches new industrial and food uses for agricultural commodities, develops new technology to improve environmental quality, and provides technical support to federal regulatory and action agencies.

With approximately 270,000 square feet (25,000 m^{2}), NCAUR is the largest of the Agricultural Research Service (USDA-ARS) research centers. The world-renowned ARS Culture Collection is maintained at this facility.

== History ==
NCAUR was one of four regional labs set up by the Agricultural Adjustment Act of 1938, when Peoria, Illinois was chosen to host this facility, named the Northern Regional Research Laboratory (NRRL). The other regional labs set up by the 1938 act are located in Wyndmoor, Pennsylvania (Eastern Regional Research Center), New Orleans, Louisiana (Southern Regional Research Center), and Albany, California (Western Regional Research Center).

The Northern Lab was renamed the National Center for Agricultural Utilization Research in 1990.

The Northern Lab developed one of the first industrialized production techniques for penicillin. This development was led by Andrew J. Moyer. This and other early scientific accomplishments at NCAUR, generated global impact, consistently bringing credit to the United States Department of Agriculture and its Agricultural Research Service. The late agricultural researcher Dr. Ed Bagley, who had been a professor at Washington University in St. Louis before coming to Peoria, was involved in finding new and better ways to improve the removal of carcinogens (and the discontinuation of their use) from corn and soy crops. Another example of their work is the development of soybeans from a small forage/rotation crop to the second largest and most valuable row crop in the U.S.

== Operation ==
NCAUR's 35 current research (CRIS) projects are mission-driven, reflecting the USDA Agricultural Research Service's National Research Programs. More than 250 research personnel from nearly a dozen scientific disciplines are divided into nine teams. Their charge is to use basic and applied science techniques to create ideas, knowledge and solutions for high priority national research problems.

These scientists publish an average of 190 peer-reviewed journal publications submitted per year, frequent invitations to present findings at national and international meetings, and continued issuance of patents and licensed technology. Technology transfer is facilitated through numerous collaborations with universities, private industry, trade associations and other government agencies.

The NCAUR facility is also home to the headquarters of the Midwest Area of the Agricultural Research Service, which includes ARS facilities in Illinois, Indiana, Iowa, Kentucky, Michigan, Minnesota, Missouri, Ohio, and Wisconsin.
