= Hart Mountain National Antelope Refuge =

National Wildlife Refuge in Oregon, U.S.

- IUCN category IV (habitat/species management area)
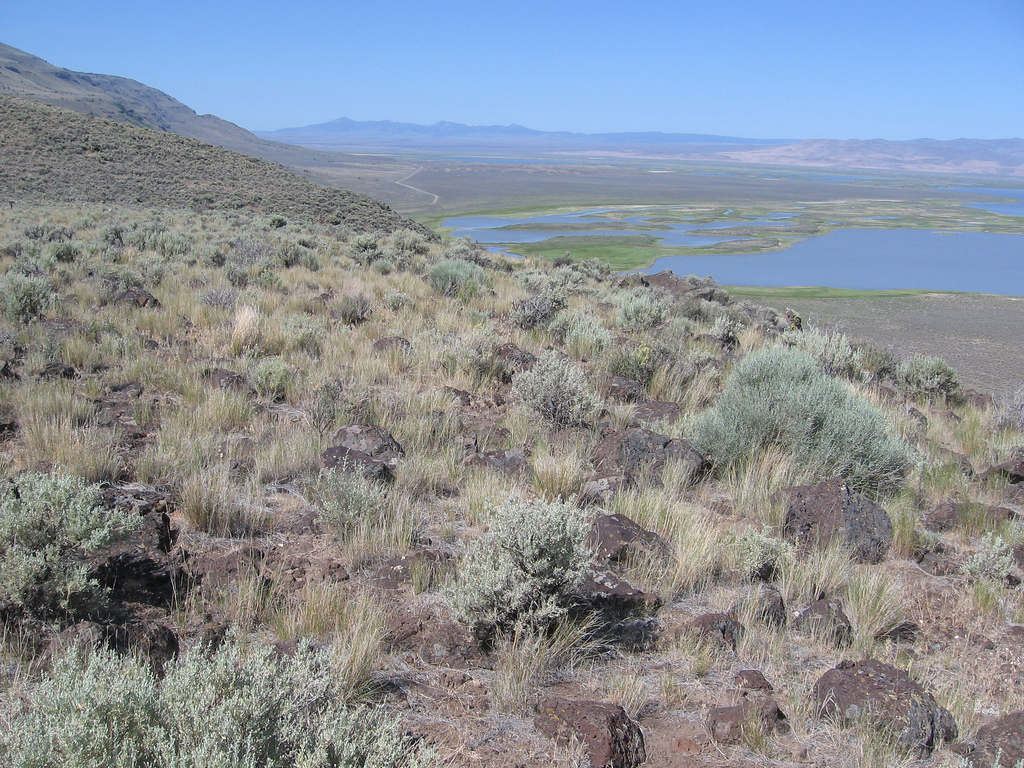
- Warner Valley from Hart Mountain, looking southwest

- Location within Oregon
- Location: Lake County, Oregon, USA
- Nearest city: Lakeview
- Coordinates: 42.5493254°N 119.6555036°W
- Area: 270,608 acres (422.825 sq mi; 1,095.11 km^{2})
- Established: 1936
- Governing body: U.S. Fish and Wildlife Service
- Website: Hart Mountain National Antelope Refuge

Hart Mountain National Antelope Refuge is a National Wildlife Refuge on Hart Mountain in southeastern Oregon, which protects more than 422 square miles (1,090 km^{2}) and more than 300 species of wildlife, including pronghorn, bighorn sheep, mule deer, sage grouse, and Great Basin redband trout. The refuge, created in 1936 as a range for remnant herds of pronghorn, spans habitats ranging from high desert to shallow playa lakes, and is among the largest wildlife habitats containing no domestic livestock.

== Protected status ==
Since its creation as an antelope reserve, management of the refuge has broadened to include conservation of all wildlife species characteristic of this high desert habitat and restoration of native ecosystems for the public's enjoyment, education, and appreciation. The area's protected status has been remarked upon by former Supreme Court Justice William O. Douglas:

I always feel sad leaving Hart Mountain. Yet after I travel a few hours and turn to see its great bulk against a southern sky my heart rejoices. This refuge will leave our grandsons and granddaughters an inheritance of the wilderness that no dollars could recreate. Here they will find life teeming throughout all the life zones that lead from the desert to alpine meadows.

— Justice William O. Douglas, My Wilderness: The Pacific West, 1960

== Recreational activities ==
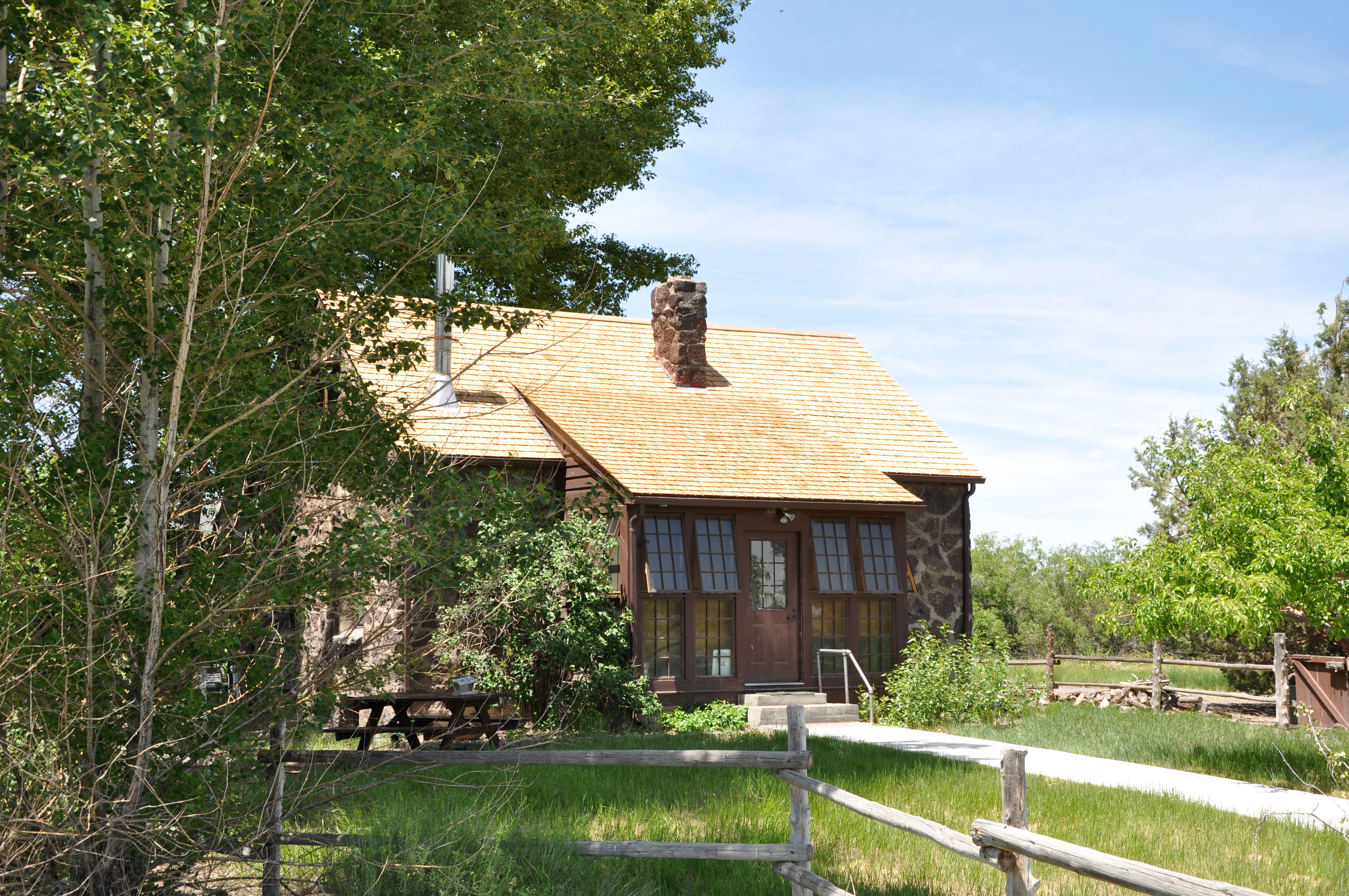
Residence at the refuge headquarters

- Wildlife photography and observation are the most popular refuge activities. There are permanent blinds throughout the refuge.
- Hiking is encouraged, but trails are not maintained, though most of the terrain permits cross-country hiking.
- Backpacking is the only way to experience remote parts of the refuge.
- Camping is free, but there are no reservations, and there is a 14-day limit. Generators and power equipment are prohibited.
- Bicycling is limited to roads open to motor vehicles, but the rough roads require sturdy bikes.
- Fishing is allowed in a few locations, with an Oregon fishing license.
- Hunting is permitted for a very limited number of deer, pronghorn and bighorn sheep.
- Rock collecting is limited to 7 pounds (3.2 kg) per day, only surface objects may be collected, Digging and blasting are not allowed. The nearby Bureau of Land Management Sunstone mine is a source for the Oregon state gemstone.

== Logistics ==
None of the refuge's roads are paved, and most are not passable by passenger autos. A few roads are graded, but most are dirt ruts ("jeep trails"). No services are available within the refuge, except compressed air, potable water, and a restroom at the refuge's headquarters.

The nearest fuel and grocery is in Plush, 25 miles (40 km) west, and Frenchglen, 50 miles (80 km) east. Lakeview, 65 miles (105 km) southwest, is the nearest city with basic services such as vehicle repair, lodging, and medical care. Accommodations are available in Frenchglen.

== Wildlife ==
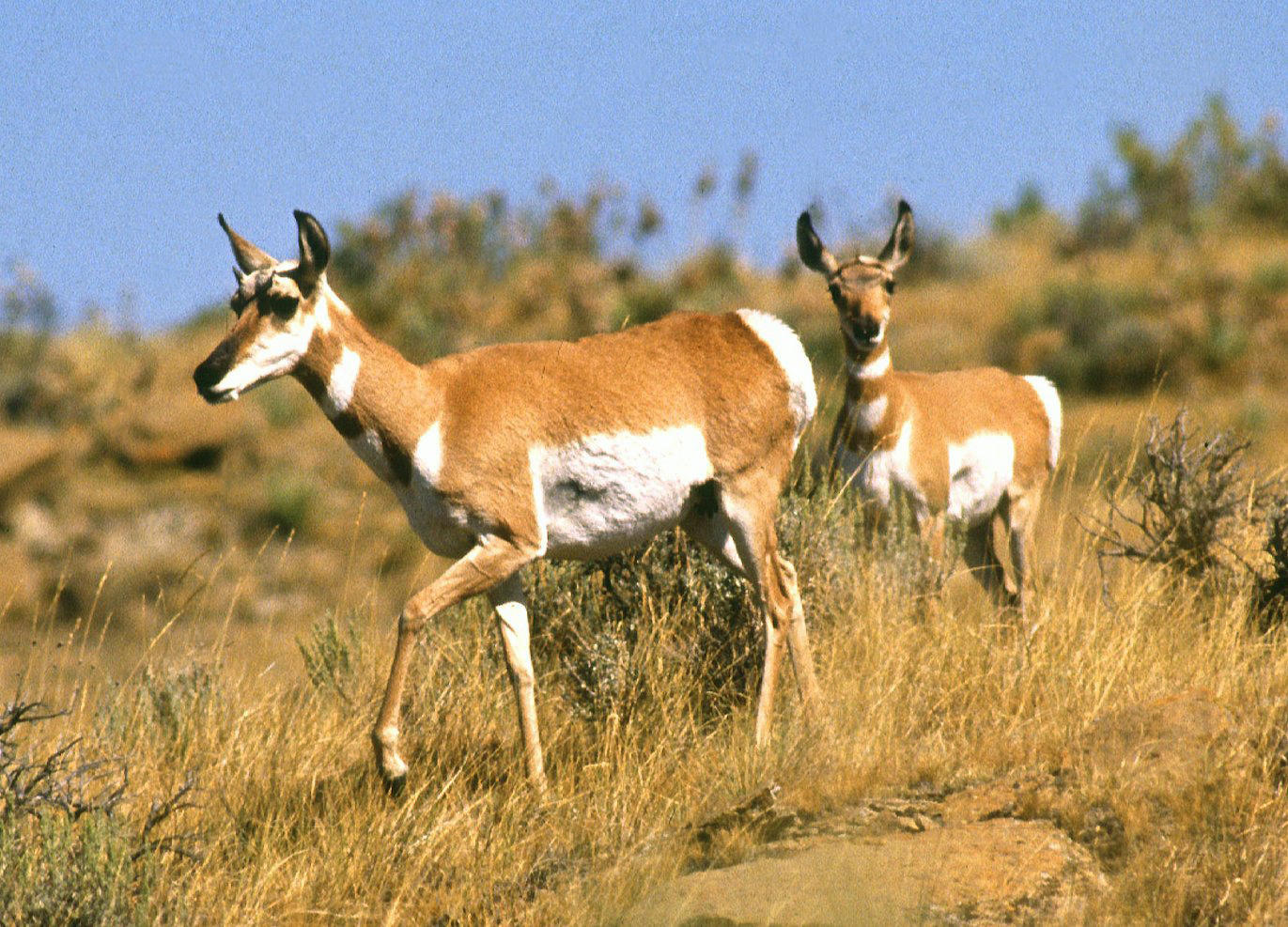
Pronghorn

The diverse habitat supports diverse wildlife: There are 239 bird species, 42 species of mammal, and at least eight species of reptile, including rattlesnake, bull snake, eastern yellowbelly racer, and various lizards.

Residents active year round include deer, bobcat, coyote, pronghorn, bighorn sheep, marmot, squirrel, and rabbit. Most birds are seasonal. Golden eagle, sandhill crane, colorful sage grouse, and numerous migratory species.

The pronghorn are North America's fastest land animal, capable of speeds up to 45 miles per hour (72 km/h), run free across the upland sagebrush at the east side. Bighorn sheep prefer the rocky cliffs of the refuge's west side. Numerous shallow lakes, grassy spring fed meadows attract the greatest variety of species.

Bighorn sheep were eliminated by disease and hunting in this area by 1915. Reintroduction began in 1954 from British Columbia stock. There are now approximately 300 bighorn sheep.

== Cattle Grazing ==
Cattle grazing in the refuge caused damage including overgrazing, eroded stream banks, trampled springs, damaged aspen groves, and destroyed wildlife habitat. In 1994, cattle grazing was banned inside the refuge. A study published in 2015 described the recovery of the landscape after cattle were removed, the return of vegetation including aspens, rushes, and willows, and the restoration of riparian areas. A Public Broadcasting System documentary, "Rewilding a Mountain", was made about that recovery.

== See also ==
- List of National Wildlife Refuges in Oregon
- Klamath Basin National Wildlife Refuges Complex, a nearby refuge
