= Northern Great Basin Experimental Range =

Livestock range operated by Oregon State University

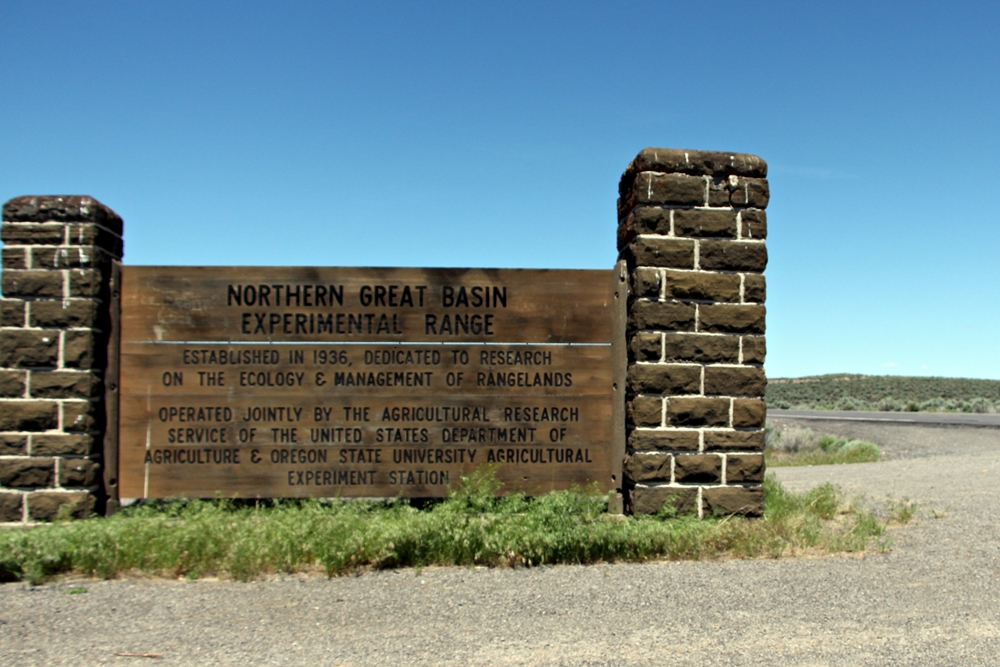
- Nearest town: Burns, Oregon, United States

The Northern Great Basin Experimental Range is a large livestock range operated by the Oregon State University's Eastern Oregon Agricultural Research Center and the United States Department of Agriculture's Agricultural Research Service. The range is located in the Oregon Outback and covers an area of 16,000 acres (6,500 ha) of land owned by the United States and a further 640 acres (260 ha) of land owned by the State of Oregon.

The Northern Great Basin Experimental Range is a testing ground for the study of fauna growth for purposes of livestock grazing in eastern Oregon's desert environment. Experimental activities are coordinated out of a research station in Burns, Oregon.

This station is not to be confused with the similarly named Great Basin Experimental Range in the Rocky Mountains.
