= Agricultural Research Service =

Research agency of the US Department of Agriculture

- Former logo of the Agricultural Research Service

Agency overview
- Formed: November 2, 1953
- Jurisdiction: United States federal government
- Headquarters: Washington, D.C.
- Employees: 7,379 employees (September 2017)
- Annual budget: $1.2 billion (FY18)
- Agency executive: Joon Park, Administrator (Acting)
- Parent agency: United States Department of Agriculture
- Website: ars.usda.gov

The Agricultural Research Service (ARS) is the principal in-house research agency of the United States Department of Agriculture (USDA). ARS is one of four agencies in USDA's Research, Education and Economics mission area. ARS is charged with extending the nation's scientific knowledge and solving agricultural problems through its four national program areas: nutrition, food safety and quality; animal production and protection; natural resources and sustainable agricultural systems; and crop production and protection. ARS research focuses on solving problems affecting Americans every day. The ARS Headquarters is located in the Jamie L. Whitten Building on Independence Avenue in Washington, D.C., and the headquarters staff is located at the George Washington Carver Center (GWCC) in Beltsville, Maryland. For 2018, its budget was $1.2 billion. For 2023, the budget grew to $1.9 billion.

== Mission ==
ARS conducts scientific research for the American public. Their main focus is on research to develop solutions to agricultural problems and provide information access and dissemination to:

- ensure high quality, safe food and other agricultural products,
- assess the nutritional needs of Americans,
- sustain a competitive agricultural economy.
- enhance the natural resource base and the environment, and
- provide economic opportunities to rural citizens, communities, and society as a whole.

ARS research complements the work of state colleges and universities, agricultural experiment stations, other federal and state agencies, and the private sector. ARS research may often focus on regional issues that have national implications, and where there is a clear federal role. ARS also provides information on its research results to USDA action and regulatory agencies and to several other federal regulatory agencies, including the Food and Drug Administration and the United States Environmental Protection Agency.

ARS disseminates much of its research results through scientific journals, technical publications, Agricultural Research magazine, and other forums. Information is also distributed through ARS's National Agricultural Library (NAL). ARS has more than 150 librarians and other information specialists who work at two NAL locations—the Abraham Lincoln Building in Beltsville, Maryland; and the DC Reference Center in Washington, D.C. NAL provides reference and information services, document delivery, interlibrary loan and interlibrary borrowing services to a variety of audiences.

== History ==
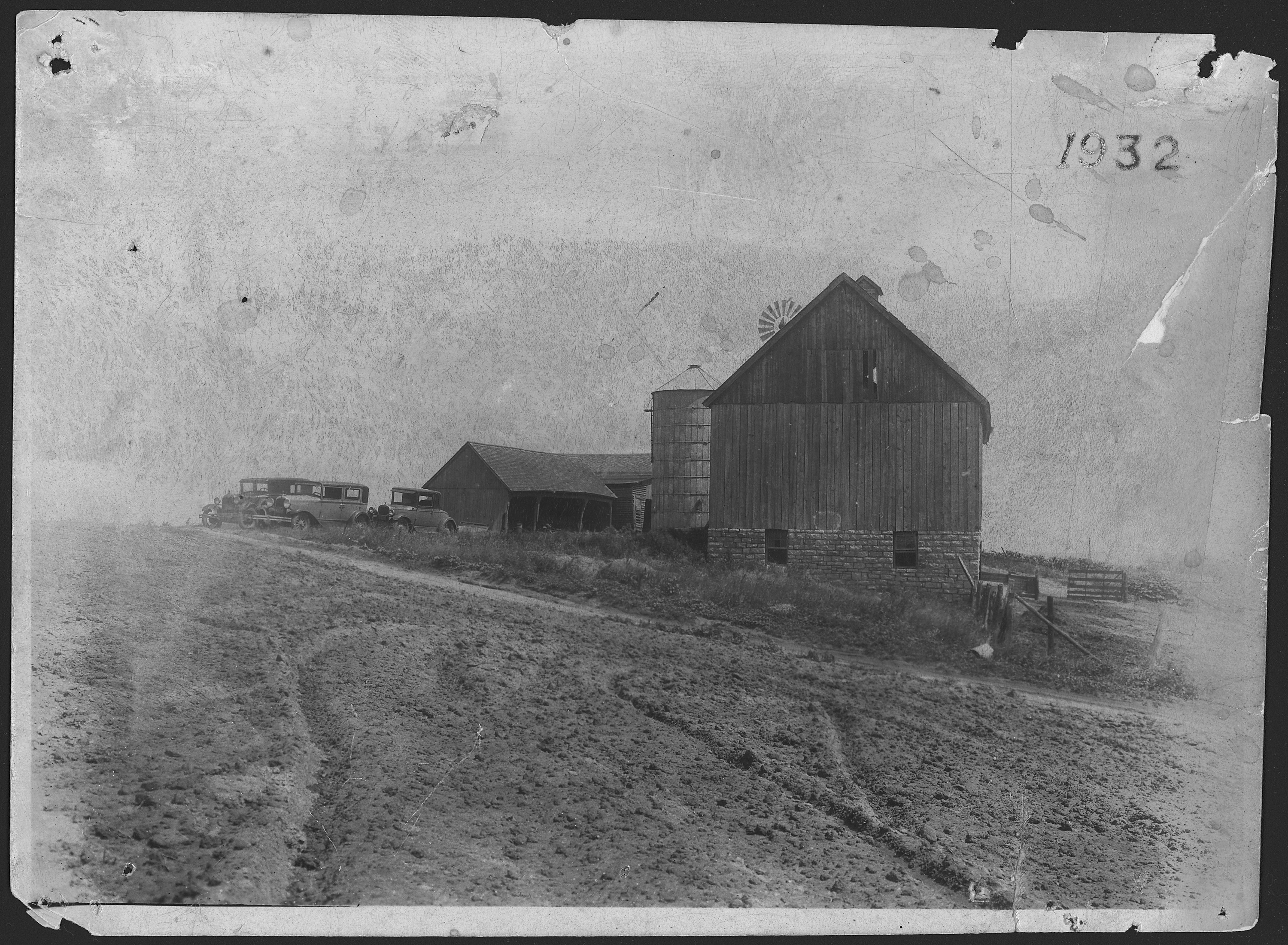
Soil erosion experimental station in LaCosse, Wisconsin, 1932

Prior to the inception of ARS, agricultural research was first conducted under the umbrella of the Agricultural Department in the U.S. Patent Office in 1839. It was created to collect statistics, distribute seeds and compile and distribute pertinent information. In 1862 the USDA was created and agricultural research was moved to its department. That same year, the department issued its first research bulletin on the sugar content of grape varietals and their suitability for wine. Six years later the USDA would begin its first research on animal diseases, specifically hog cholera, which was causing devastating losses at the time. In the early 1900s the USDA began analyzing food composition and the first studies of nutrition and the effects of cooking and processing foods were conducted. Finally, in 1953 the Agricultural Research Service was created to be the USDA's primary scientific research agency.

== Research centers ==
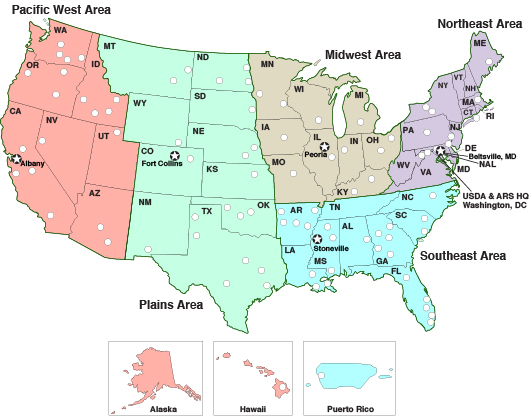
ARS Geographic Regions

ARS supports more than 2,000 scientists and post docs working on approximately 690 research projects within 15 National Programs at more than 90 research locations. The ARS is divided into 5 geographic areas: Midwest Area, Northeast Area, Pacific West Area, Plains Area, and Southeast Area. ARS has five major regional research centers:

- Western Regional Research Center in Albany, California
- Center for Agricultural Resources Research in Fort Collins, Colorado
- Southern Regional Research Center in New Orleans, Louisiana
- National Center for Agricultural Utilization Research in Peoria, Illinois
- Eastern Regional Research Center in Wyndmoor, Pennsylvania

The research centers focus on innovation in agricultural practices, pest control, health, and nutrition among other things. Work at these facilities has given life to numerous products, processes, and technologies.

ARS' Henry A. Wallace Beltsville Agricultural Research Center (BARC) in Beltsville, Maryland, is the world's largest agricultural research complex. Other D.C. area locations include the United States National Agricultural Library and the United States National Arboretum.

ARS also has six major human nutrition research centers that focus on solving a wide spectrum of human nutrition questions by providing authoritative, peer-reviewed, science-based evidence. The centers are located in Arkansas, Maryland, Texas, North Dakota, Massachusetts (the Human Nutrition Research Center on Aging), and California. ARS scientists at these centers study the role of food and dietary components in human health from conception to advanced age.

The ARS also offers the Culture Collection, which is the largest public collection of microorganisms in the world, containing approximately 93,000 strains of bacteria and fungi. The ARS Culture Collection is housed at the National Center for Agricultural Utilization Research (NCAUR). There is also a collection of entomopathogenic fungi, called ARSEF, at the Robert W. Holley Center for Agriculture and Health in Ithaca, New York. The ARS operates the U.S. Horticultural Research Laboratory in Fort Pierce, Florida, and the U.S. National Poultry Research Center in Athens, Georgia. Other notable ARS facilities include Northern Great Basin Experimental Range in Oregon, and formerly the Plum Island Animal Disease Center off Long Island.

Several ARS research units focus on pests, diseases, and management practices of horticultural crops. The Cereal Disease Laboratory is located on the campus of the University of Minnesota in Saint Paul. It primarily hosts research into rusts and Fusaria of cereals. The San Joaquin Valley Agricultural Sciences Center in Parlier, California conducts research on specialty crops including grapes, citrus, almonds, alfalfa, peaches, pomegranates, and many others. Several research locations throughout the US also house germplasm collections of plant species important for agricultural and industrial uses as part of the National Genetic Resources Program.

== Research impacts ==
From the very beginning the Department of Agriculture and in turn the Agricultural Research Service has been focused on improving not only the farming industry but also the quality of food and the health of Americans. In 1985, technology to produce lactose-free milk, yogurt, and ice cream was developed through the Agricultural Research Service. The grape breeding program, currently located in Parlier, CA which began in 1923, developed seedless grapes and continues to release new grapevine varieties with improved traits. The ARS Citrus and Subtropical Products Laboratory in Winter Haven, Florida, actively works to improve the taste of orange juice concentrate.

The Agricultural Research Service had a Toxoplasma gondii (T. gondii) research program, which experimented on cats infected with the parasite, from 1982 until 2018. The prevalence of T. gondii parasite has been reduced by 50% in the U.S. As of September 2018, which the ARS claims is a result of their research. The USDA has since discontinued the use of cats in their research amid acute accusations of animal abuse, and a lack of meaningful contribution to the field in recent years (only three of thirteen papers published about T. gondii by the ARS were published after the year 2000).

More recently, the ARS has focused research on genetics and plant and animal DNA. Their research has developed pest-resistant corn, faster growing plants and fish, and a focus on plant and animal genome research and mapping. Outside of scientific research, the ARS has worked to release databases on food components in order to assist consumers with making informed decisions about food choices.

== See also ==
- Agricultural Resource Management Survey
- Germplasm Resources Information Network
- Human Nutrition Research Center on Aging
- National Agricultural Center and Hall of Fame
- National Clonal Germplasm Repository
- National Interagency Confederation for Biological Research
- Title 7 of the Code of Federal Regulations

== Sources ==
- "Agricultural Research Service". Archived from the original on October 14, 2004.
- "Image gallery". Agricultural Research Service. Archived from the original on October 6, 2005. – An online catalog from the Agricultural Research Service Information Staff.
- "Western Regional Research Center". Archived from the original on September 1, 2009.
- "Southern Regional Research Center". Archived from the original on August 26, 2009.
- "National Center for Agricultural Utilization Research". Archived from the original on August 31, 2009.
- "Eastern Regional Research Center". Archived from the original on September 3, 2009.
- "ARS Human Nutrition Research". Archived from the original on September 2, 2009.
- "National Agricultural Library". Archived from the original on November 16, 2008.
- "White Coat Waste Project" (PDF). White Coat Waste Project.
