= Human Nutrition Research Center on Aging =

The Jean Mayer Human Nutrition Research Center on Aging (HNRCA), located in Boston, Massachusetts, is one of six human nutrition research centers in the United States supported by the United States Department of Agriculture Agricultural Research Service. The goal of the HNRCA, which is managed by Tufts University, is to explore the relationship between nutrition, physical activity, and healthy and active aging.

== History ==
In the Food and Agriculture Act of 1977, Congress directed the Secretary of Agriculture to establish a comprehensive human nutrition research program and to study the potential cost and value of regional research centers for nutrition. The Agriculture Appropriations Bill, passed later in 1977, instructed the USDA to establish an "adult" human nutrition research facility at Tufts University in Massachusetts. On August 1, 1979, the Cooperative Agreement between Tufts University and the USDA was signed, and on October 23 of the same year, the National Institute on Aging and the USDA signed a Memorandum of Understanding detailing their mutual interest in the HNRCA at Tufts University. Tufts University donated land from its Boston campus for the HNRCA. It is run by cooperative agreement between the ARS and Tufts University.

== Contributions to society ==
The HNRCA is one of the largest research centers in the world studying nutrition and physical activity in healthy and active aging and the prevention of age-related disease. It has made significant contributions to U.S. and international nutritional and physical activity recommendations, public policy, and clinical healthcare. These contributions include advancements in the knowledge of the role of dietary calcium and vitamin D in promoting nutrition and bone health, the role of nutrients in maintaining the optimal immune response and prevention of infectious diseases, role of diet in prevention of cancer, obesity research, modifications to the Food Guide Pyramid, contribution to USDA nutrient data bank, advancements in the study of sarcopenia, heart disease, vision, brain and cognitive function, front of packaging food labeling initiatives, and research of how genetic factors impact predisposition to weight gain and various health indicators.

== Center structure ==
The HNRCA employs 270 people, including 60 scientific researchers (holding degrees of Ph.D., M.D., M.P.H., D.V.M.) with faculty appointments at different schools at Tufts University, adjunct scientists, postdoctoral fellows, visiting scientists, ARS researchers, graduate students and other trainees, and administrative and scientific support staff. HNRCA scientists are trained in nutrition, biochemistry, genetics, medicine, endocrinology, gastroenterology, physiology, veterinary medicine, epidemiology, physics, and molecular biology.

== Current research ==
Research clusters within the HNRCA address four specific strategic areas: 1) Cancer, 2) Cardiovascular Disease, 3) Inflammation, Immunity, and Infectious Disease and 4) Obesity.

HNRCA scientists collectively average more than one high-impact scientific journal publication each business day of the year and are often cited in the media.

== Internal core units ==
Essential scientific core services provided within the HNRCA are Biostatistics, Comparative Biology Unit, Dietary Assessment Unit, Functional Genomics, Mass Spectrometry, Metabolic Research Unit, and Nutrition Evaluation Laboratory.

== Research and publications ==
The HNRCA scientists collectively average more than one high-impact scientific journal publication each business day of the year and receive a large amount of high-profile media exposure.

== See also ==
- USDA Agricultural Research Service
