= Agricultural Adjustment Act of 1938 =

United States federal law

- Long title: An Act to provide for the conservation of national soil resources and to provide an adequate and balanced flow of agricultural commodities in interstate and domestic commerce and for other purposes.
- Enacted by: the 75th United States Congress
- Effective: February 16, 1938

Citations
- Public law: 75-430
- Statutes at Large: 52 Stat. 31

Codification
- Titles amended: 7 U.S.C.: Agriculture
- U.S.C. sections created: Chapter 35 § 1281

Legislative history
- Introduced in the House as H.R. 8505; Reported by the joint conference committee on February 9, 1938; agreed to by the House on February 9, 1938 (264-135) and by the Senate on February 9, 1938 (passed); Signed into law by President Franklin D. Roosevelt on February 16, 1938

This is an article about the "Agricultural Adjustment Act of 1938". For the act by the same name in 1933, see Agricultural Adjustment Act.

The Agricultural Adjustment Act of 1938 (Pub. L. 75–430, 52 Stat. 31, enacted February 16, 1938) was legislation in the United States that was enacted as an alternative and replacement for the farm subsidy policies, in previous New Deal farm legislation (Agricultural Adjustment Act of 1933), that had been found unconstitutional. The act revived the provisions in the previous Agriculture Adjustment Act, with the exception that the financing of the law's programs would be provided by the Federal Government and not a processor's tax, and was also enforced as a response to the success of the Soil Conservation and Domestic Allotment Act of 1936.

== Provisions and history ==
The act was the first to make price support mandatory for corn, cotton, and wheat to help maintain a sufficient supply in low production periods along with marketing quotas to keep supply in line with market demand. It established permissive supports for butter, dates, figs, hops, turpentine, rosin, pecans, prunes, raisins, barley, rye, grain sorghum, wool, winter cover-crop seeds, mohair, peanuts, and tobacco for the 1938-40 period. The agriculture industry changed during the 1930s due to improvements in technology and exposed the south to more modern farming methods, as well as diversifying land. Many acres normally devoted to cotton were now being used to raise cattle or used more efficiently which increased production per acre. Also, title V of the Act established the Federal Crop Insurance Corporation.

=== Legal challenge ===
The constitutionality of the act was challenged in the case of Wickard v. Filburn, which reached the United States Supreme Court in 1942. The law was upheld as constitutional under the Commerce Clause of the United States Constitution. Wickard is considered a landmark Supreme Court case because of the Court's broad interpretation of the Commerce Clause.

=== Permanent law ===
The 1940 Act is considered part of permanent law for commodity programs and farm income support (along with the Commodity Credit Corporation Charter Act and the Agricultural Act of 1949).

== Sources ==
- Dictionary of American History, ed. Jamie Trustislow Adams, New York: Charles Scribner's Sons, 1940
