= List of presidents of the University of Texas at Austin =

President of the University of Texas at Austin
- Incumbent; Jim Davis since February 19, 2025
- University of Texas at Austin
- Inaugural holder: Leslie Waggener
- Formation: 1895
- Website: president.utexas.edu

The University of Texas at Austin (UT Austin) is a public university in Austin, Texas, and the flagship university of the University of Texas System. The university has been led by 31 presidents since the office of the president was founded in 1895. The current officeholder is Jim Davis, who has served as president since 2025.

The position did not exist when UT Austin was established in 1883. Its founders followed the system established at the University of Virginia and gave control to the faculty, under a board of regents, through a chairman of their choosing. John William Mallet served as the first chairman of the faculty for most of the 1883–1884 academic year, with William Leroy Broun serving briefly at the end of the year. Leslie Waggener received the position in 1884 and served for ten years; Thomas Scott Miller took the role in 1894. By 1895, due to the need for a full-time executive, Waggener became the university's first president on an interim basis.

Many presidents early in the university's history had relatively short tenures. Tensions with the Board of Regents led to the removals of Homer P. Rainey in 1944 and Stephen H. Spurr in 1974; Rainey's firing over academic freedom and interference from regents particularly harmed the university's reputation for several years after and earned censure from the American Association of University Professors. In 1950, a separate chancellor position for the University of Texas System was established; that office assumed the responsibilities of the UT Austin president from 1963 to 1967.

Harry Yandell Benedict is the longest-serving president, as well as the first UT Austin alumnus to become president. Lorene Rogers became the university's first female president and has been called the first woman to lead a major state university. Peter T. Flawn served two separate terms as president, the only individual to do so. Several buildings on the UT Austin campus are named for past presidents, including Battle, Benedict, Calhoun, Mezes, Rainey, Painter, and Waggener Halls; the Larry R. Faulkner Nano Science and Technology Building; the Peter T. Flawn Academic Center; the Norman Hackerman Building; the William C. Powers Student Activity Center; and the Harry Ransom Center.

== Presidents ==
Presidents of the University of Texas at Austin
| No. | Name | Term start (Note: Start and end dates and interim/acting titles are based on the list from the University of Texas System. The dates and titles listed on the UT Austin website differ slightly.) | Term end | Notes (Note: Positions are within UT Austin unless stated.) | Ref. |
|---|---|---|---|---|---|
| 1 | Leslie Waggener | September 7, 1895 | June 30, 1896 | Interim president; president of Bethel College (1877–1883); chairman of the faculty (1884–1894) | |
| 2 | George Tayloe Winston | July 1, 1896 | September 15, 1899 | President of the University of North Carolina (1891–1896); president of North Carolina College of Agriculture and Mechanic Arts (1899–1908) | |
| 3 | William Lambdin Prather | November 4, 1899 | July 24, 1905 | President of the Texas Bar Association (1895–1896); chairman of the Board of Regents (1899–1900) | |
| 4 | David Franklin Houston | September 1, 1905 | September 1, 1908 | President of the Agricultural and Mechanical College of Texas (1902–1905); chancellor of Washington University in St. Louis (1908–1913); United States Secretary of Agriculture (1913–1920); United States Secretary of the Treasury (1920–1921) | |
| 5 | Sidney Edward Mezes | September 1, 1908 | December 15, 1914 | Dean of the College of Arts and Sciences (1902–1908); president of the College of the City of New York (1914–1927) | |
| 6 | William James Battle | November 16, 1914 | June 30, 1916 | Acting president; dean of the College of Arts and Sciences (1908–1911); dean of the faculty (1911–1917) | |
| 7 | Robert Ernest Vinson | July 1, 1916 | June 30, 1923 | President of Austin Presbyterian Theological Seminary (1908–1916); president of Western Reserve University (1923–1933) | |
| 8 | William Seneca Sutton | July 1, 1923 | July 31, 1924 | Interim president; dean of the School of Education (1909–1926) | |
| 9 | Walter Marshall William Splawn | August 1, 1924 | September 1, 1927 | Dean of the American University Graduate School (1929–1934); member of the Interstate Commerce Commission (1934–1953) | |
| 10 | Harry Yandell Benedict | September 1, 1927 | May 10, 1937 | Earned BS and MA from the university (1892, 1893); dean of the College of Arts and Sciences (1911–1927) | |
| 11 | John William Calhoun | June 1, 1937 | May 31, 1939 | Interim president; earned BA from the university (1905); comptroller (1925–1940) | |
| 12 | Homer Price Rainey | June 1, 1939 | November 1, 1944 | President of Franklin College (1927–1931); president of Bucknell University (1931–1935); president of Stephens College (1947–1952); fired by the Board of Regents | |
| 13 | Theophilus Shickel Painter | November 2, 1944 | August 31, 1952 | Acting president from November 1944 to May 1946; acting chancellor of the University of Texas System (1950) | |
| 14 | James Clay Dolley | September 1, 1952 | January 31, 1953 | Acting president; vice president (1945–1953); vice chancellor for fiscal affairs of the University of Texas System (1955–1966) | |
| 15 | Logan Wilson | February 1, 1953 | August 31, 1960 | Earned MA from the university (1927); dean of Newcomb College at Tulane University (1944–1951); vice president and provost of the Consolidated University of North Carolina (1951–1953); chancellor of the University of Texas System (1954, 1960–1961); president of the American Council on Education (1961–1971) | |
| 16 | Harry Huntt Ransom | September 1, 1960 | May 31, 1961 | Interim president; dean of the College of Arts and Sciences (1954–1957); vice president and provost (1957–1960); chancellor of the University of Texas System (1961–1971) | |
| 17 | Joseph Royall Smiley | June 1, 1961 | June 30, 1963 | Dean of the University of Illinois College of Liberal Arts and Sciences (1954–1958); president of Texas Western College / the University of Texas at El Paso (1958–1960, 1969–1972); vice president and provost (1960–1961); president of the University of Colorado (1963–1969) | |
| – | — | July 1, 1963 | November 1, 1967 | Office abolished; duties assumed by chancellor Harry Ransom | |
| 18 | Norman Hackerman | November 1, 1967 | September 1, 1970 | Acting president; vice president and provost (1961–1963); vice chancellor for academic affairs (1963–1967); president of Rice University (1970–1985) | |
| 19 | Bryce Jordan | July 1, 1970 | July 1, 1971 | Interim president; earned BM and MM from the university (1948, 1949); vice president for student affairs (1968–1970); president of the University of Texas at Dallas (1971–1981); president of Pennsylvania State University (1983–1990) | |
| 20 | Stephen Hopkins Spurr | July 9, 1971 | September 24, 1974 | Dean of the University of Michigan School of Natural Resources (1962–1964); dean of the University of Michigan Rackham Graduate School (1964–1971); fired by the Board of Regents and chancellor Charles LeMaistre | |
| 21 | Lorene Lane Rogers | September 25, 1974 | August 31, 1979 | Interim president from September 1974 to September 1975; earned MA and PhD from the university (1946, 1948); vice president (1971–1974) | |
| 22 | Peter Tyrrell Flawn | September 1, 1979 | August 31, 1985 | Vice president for academic affairs (1970–1972); executive vice president (1972); president of the University of Texas at San Antonio (1973–1977) | |
| 23 | William H. Cunningham | September 1, 1985 | August 31, 1992 | Dean of the College and Graduate School of Business (1983–1985); chancellor of the University of Texas System (1992–2000) | |
| 24 | William S. Livingston | September 1, 1992 | December 31, 1992 | Acting president; vice president and dean of Graduate Studies (1979–1995); senior vice president (1995–2007) | |
| 25 | Robert M. Berdahl | January 1, 1993 | June 30, 1997 | Dean of the University of Oregon College of Arts and Sciences (1981–1986); chancellor of the University of California, Berkeley (1997–2004); president of the Association of American Universities (2006–2011); interim president of the University of Oregon (2011–2012) | |
| 26 | Peter Tyrrell Flawn | July 1, 1997 | April 12, 1998 | Interim president; second term as president | |
| 27 | Larry R. Faulkner | April 13, 1998 | January 31, 2006 | Earned PhD from the university (1969); dean of the University of Illinois College of Liberal Arts and Sciences (1989–1994); interim chancellor of the University of Texas System (2018) | |
| 28 | William C. Powers Jr. | February 1, 2006 | June 2, 2015 | Dean of the School of Law (2000–2006); chair of the Association of American Universities (2013–2014) | |
| 29 | Gregory L. Fenves | June 3, 2015 | May 31, 2020 | Dean of the Cockrell School of Engineering (2008–2013); executive vice president and provost (2013–2015); president of Emory University (2020–2025) | |
| 30 | Jay Hartzell | June 1, 2020 | February 18, 2025 | Interim president from June to September 2020; earned PhD from the university (1998); dean of the McCombs School of Business (2016–2020); president of Southern Methodist University (2025–present) | |
| 31 | James E. Davis | February 19, 2025 | – | Interim president from February to August 2025; earned BA from the university (1996); vice president of legal affairs (2018–2023); senior vice president and chief operating officer (2023–2025) | |

=== Gallery ===
Leslie Waggener

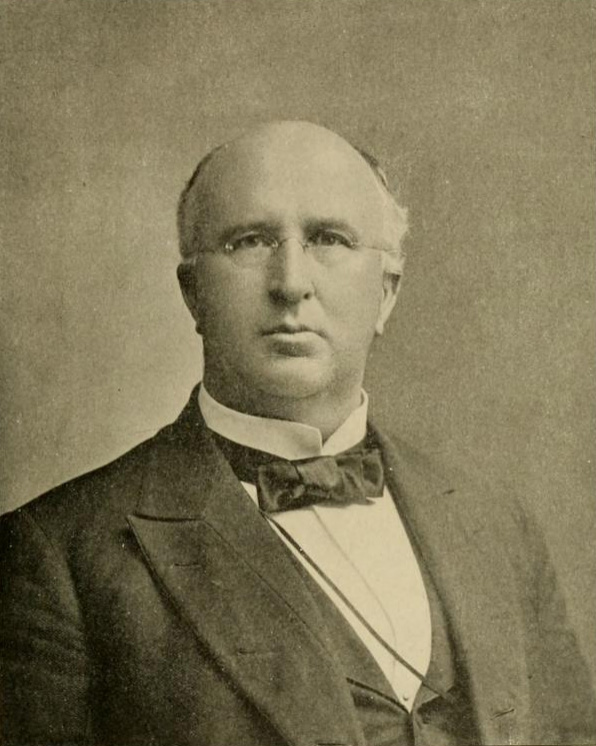
George Tayloe Winston

William Lambdin Prather

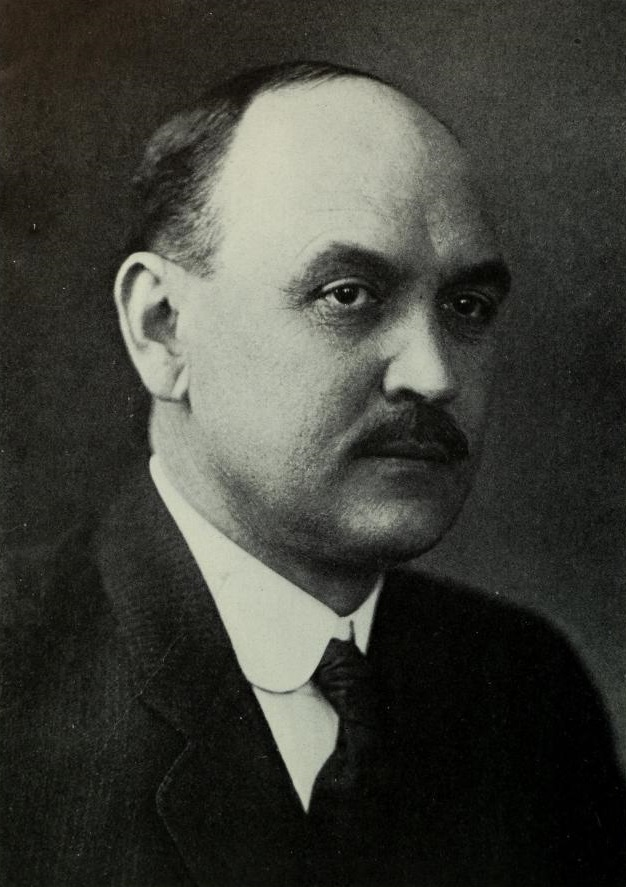
David Franklin Houston

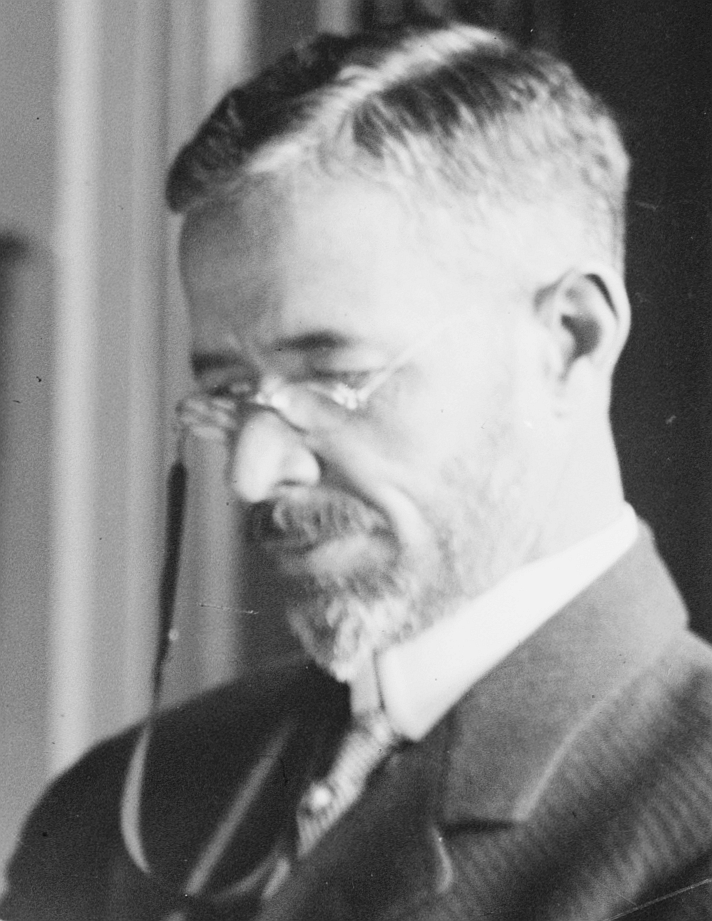
Sidney Edward Mezes

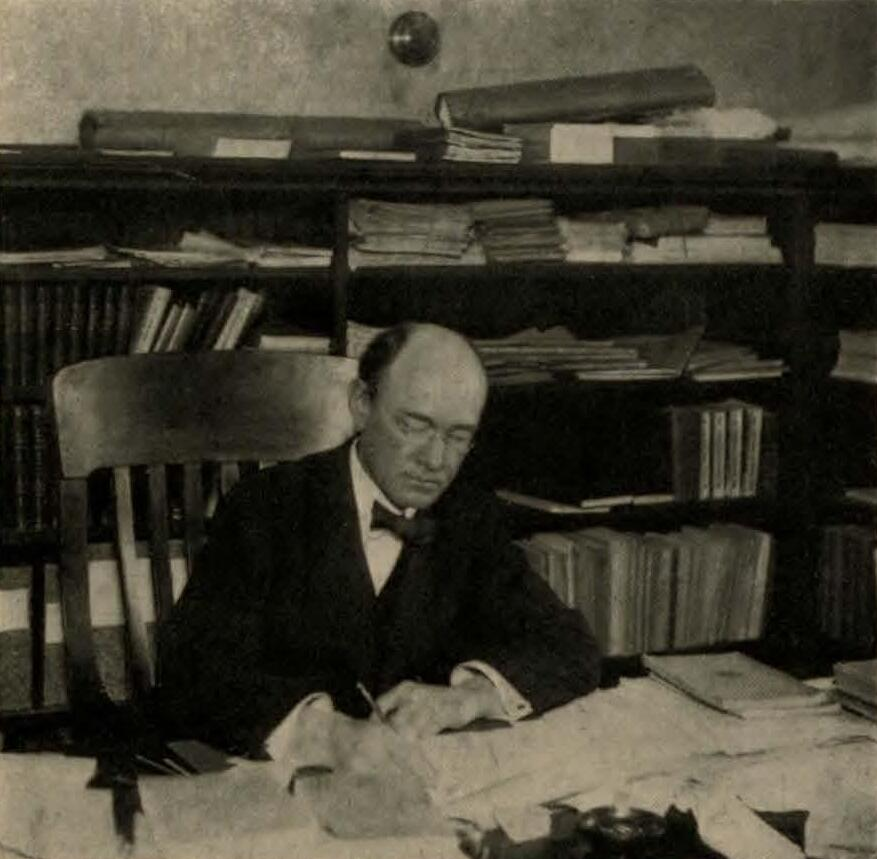
William James Battle

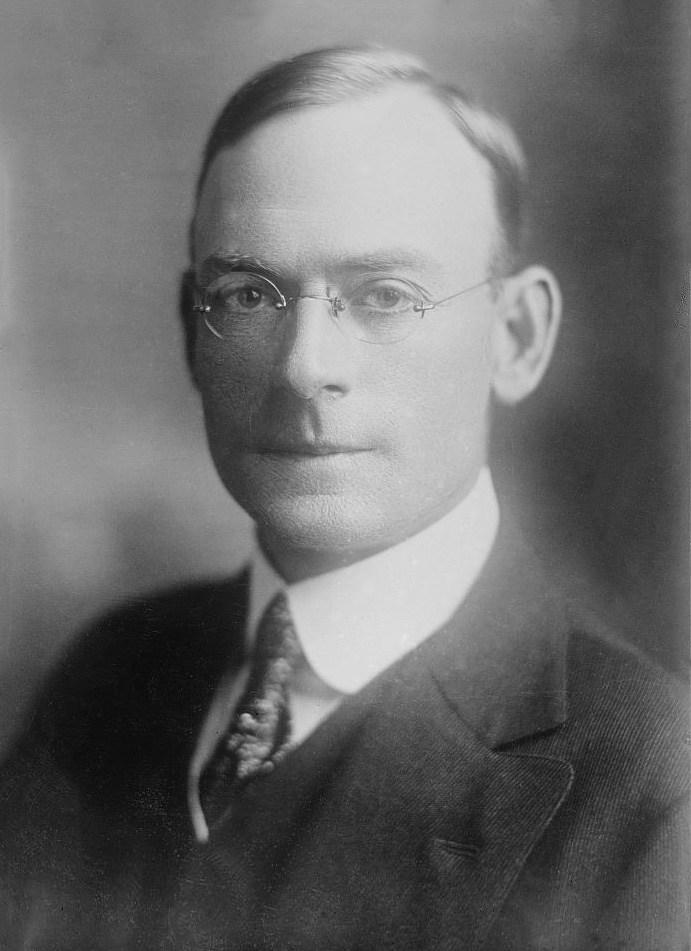
Robert Ernest Vinson

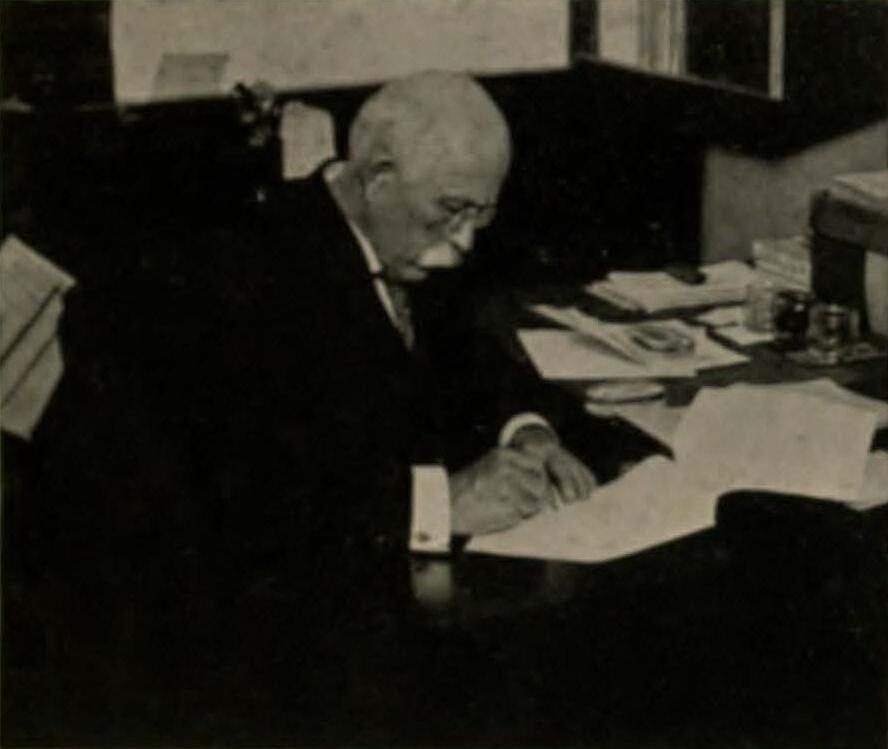
William Seneca Sutton

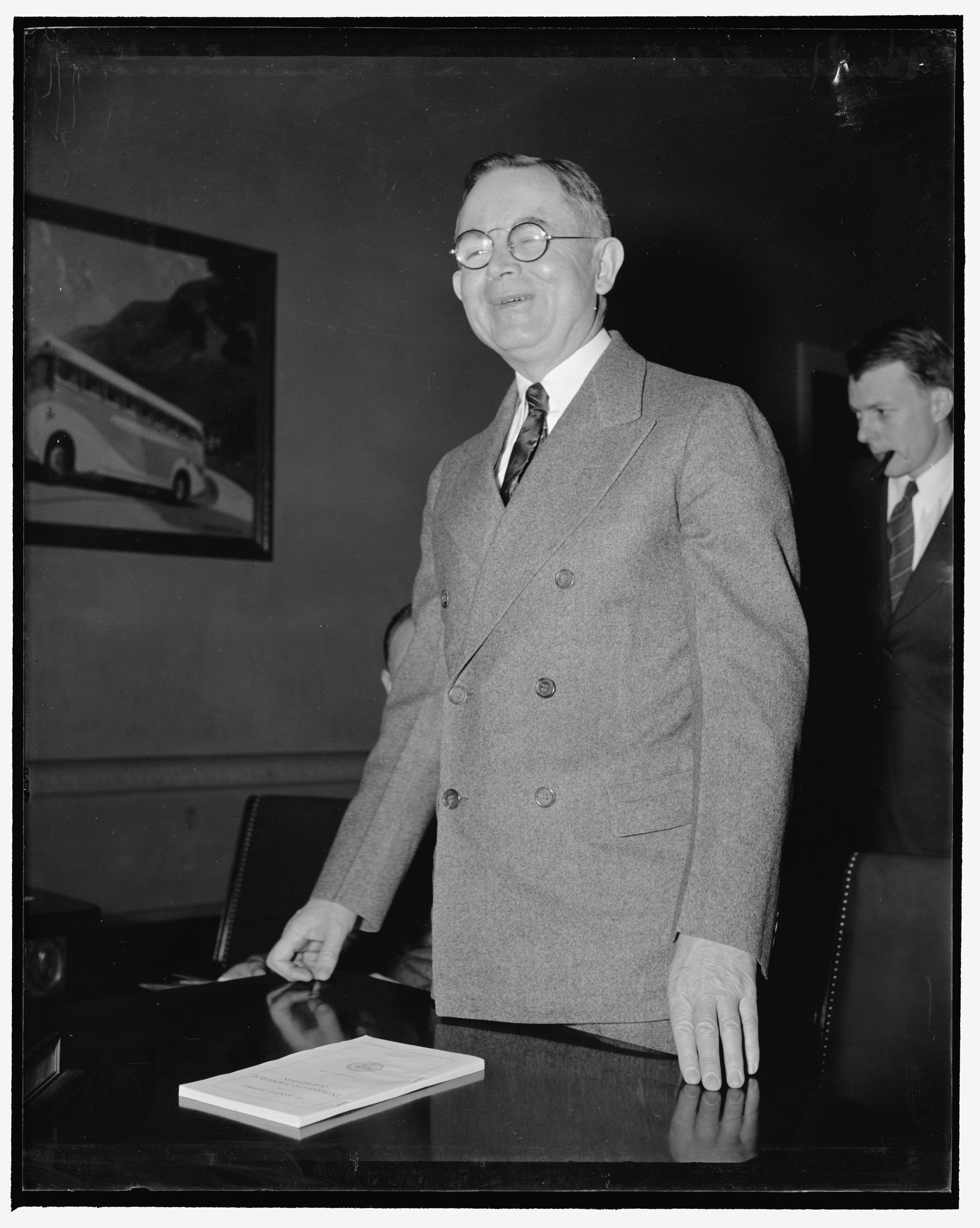
Walter Marshall William Splawn

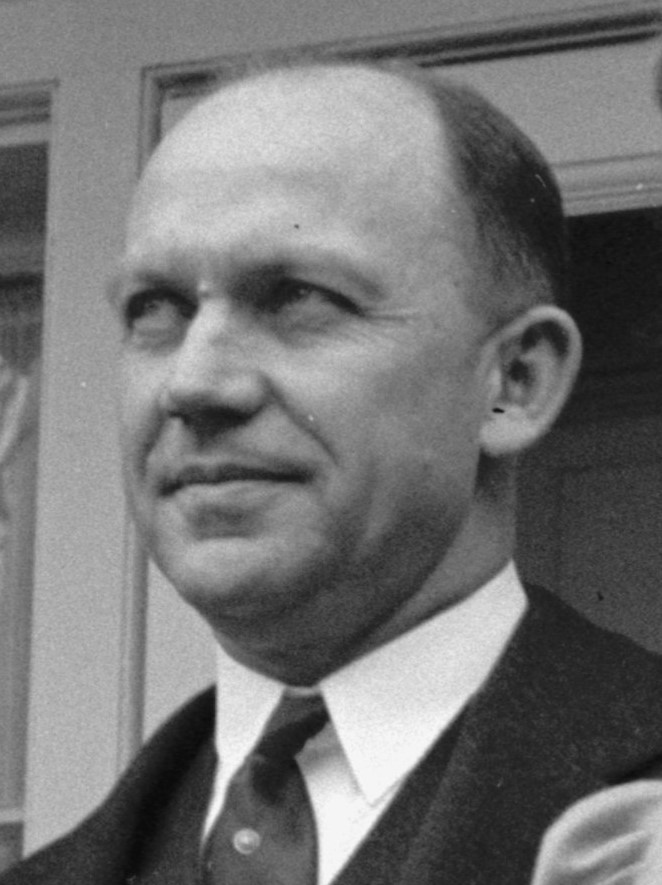
Homer Price Rainey

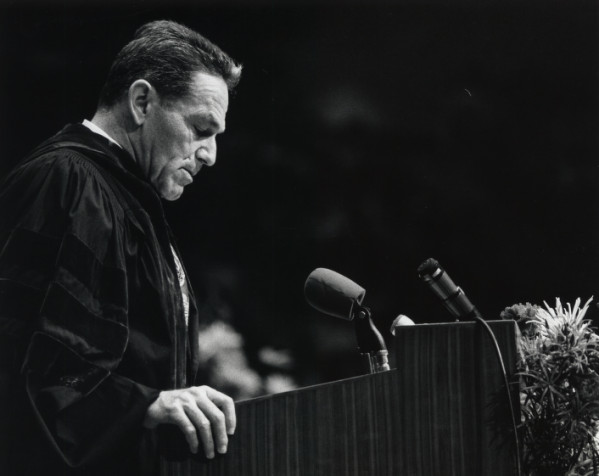
Norman Hackerman

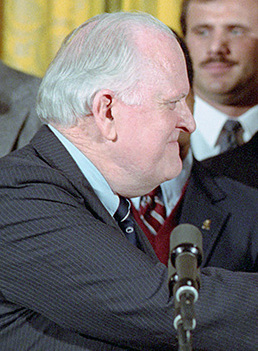
Bryce Jordan

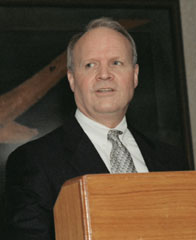
Larry R. Faulkner

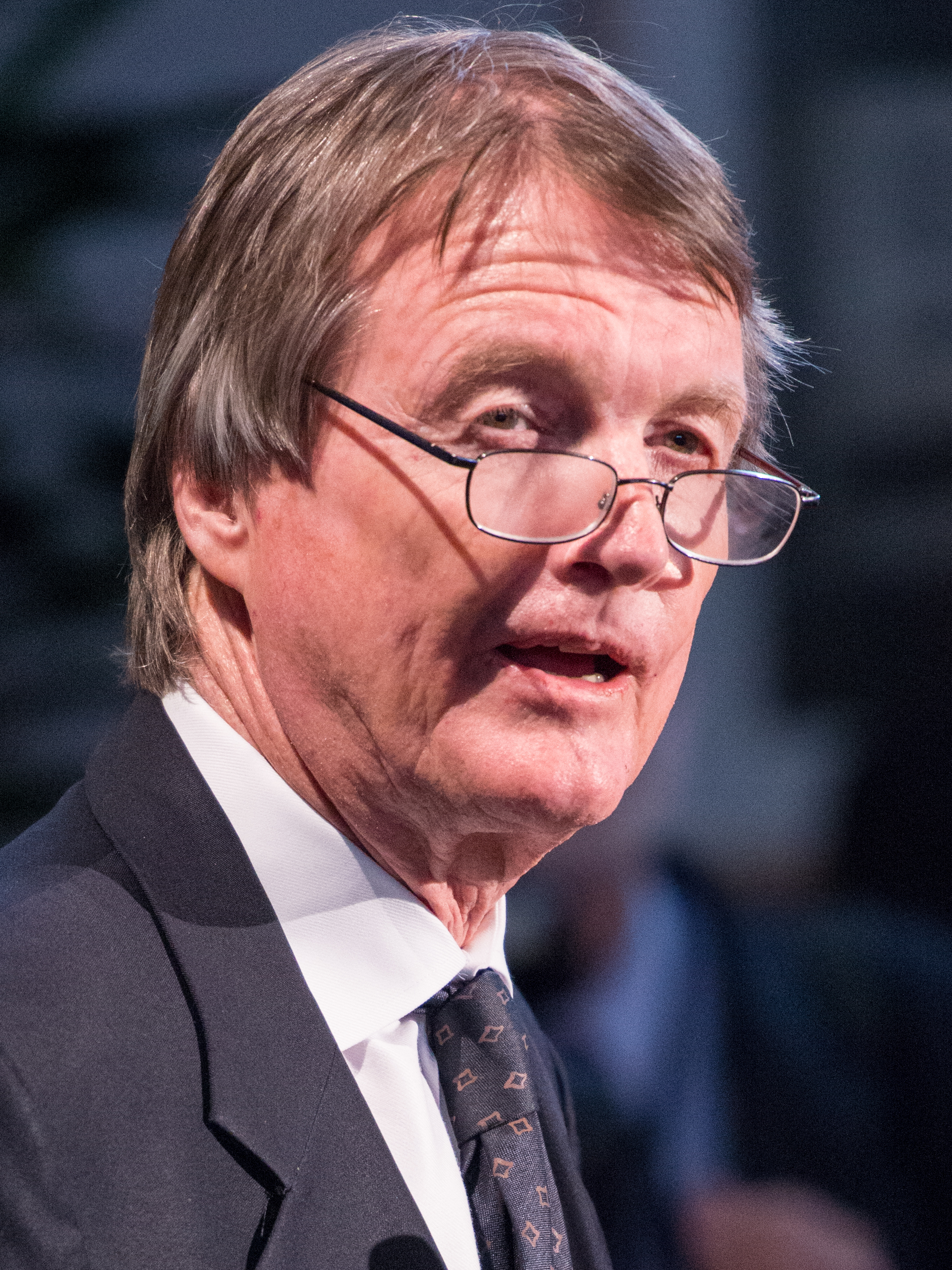
William C. Powers Jr.

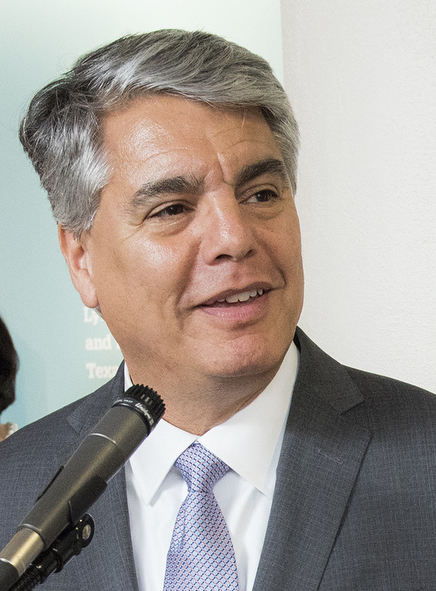
Gregory L. Fenves

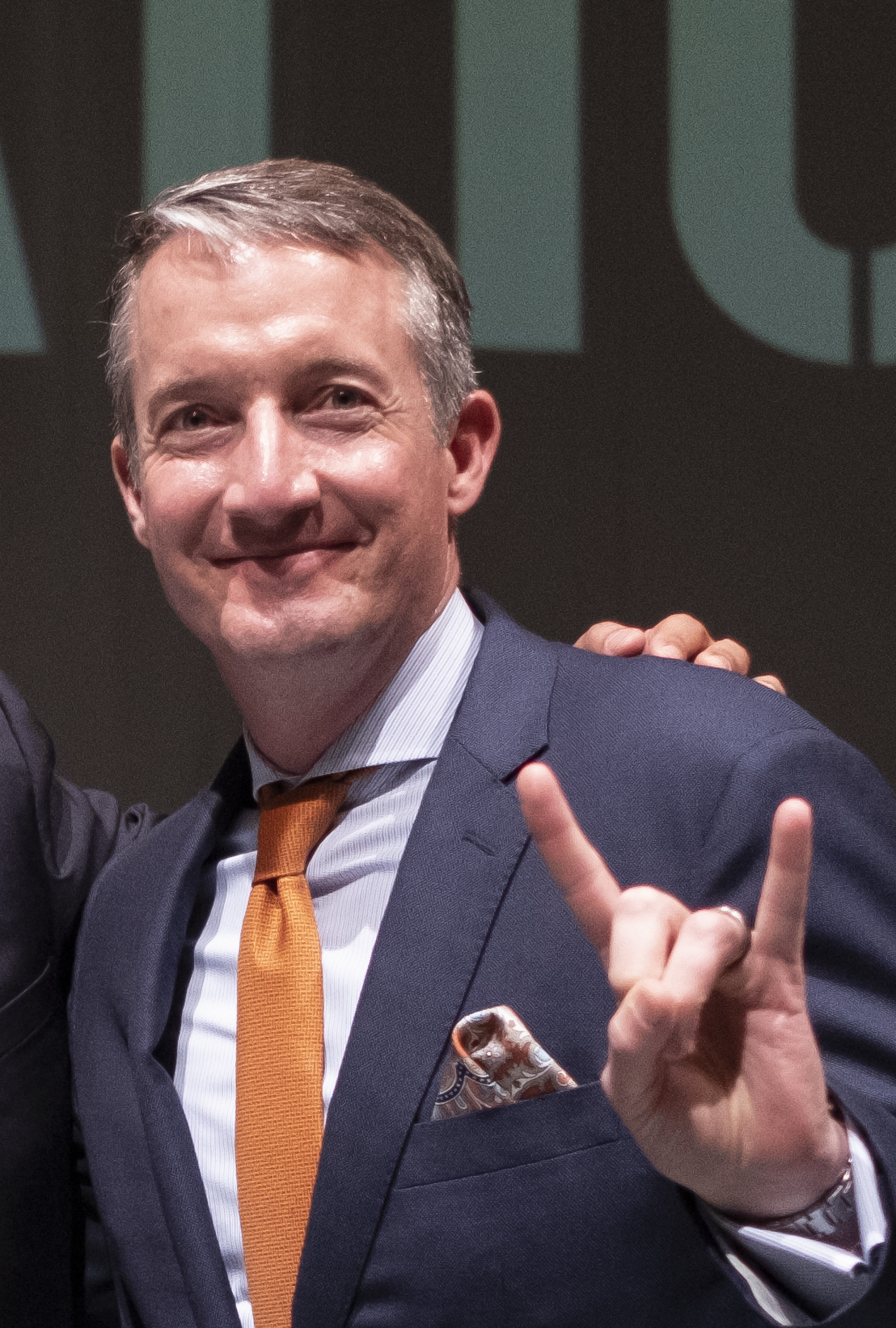
Jay Hartzell
