= Burton V. Barnes =

North American botanist (1930 – 2014)

Burton 'Burt' Verne Barnes
- Born: 4 November 1930; Bloomington, Illinois
- Died: 3 July 2014 (aged 83)
- Education: Eastern Illinois University & University of Michigan B.S.F., 1952; University of Michigan, M.F., 1953; University of Göttingen, Ph.D., 1959
- Scientific career
- Institutions: University of Michigan
- Doctoral advisor: Stephen H. Spurr

Burton 'Burt' Verne Barnes (1930 – 2014) was a botanist known best for his forestry instruction at the University of Michigan. Barnes authored and coauthored many influential books, with the most prominent being Michigan Trees, a field guide completed in collaboration with Warren H. Wagner. Much of his work focused on the Northern areas of the Lower Peninsula of Michigan and the Kirtland's warbler. Barnes is also well-known for being the first scientist to recognize the largest known individual tree, the Populus tremuloides colony known as "Pando".

== Early life and education ==
Barnes was the son of band director Frances Ruby Grafton Barnes and Verne Hart Barnes, who worked at Camp Mishawaka in Minnesota where Barnes began collecting and pressing plants in his youth. Barnes married Lenora Barnes, a physical therapist by trade, in 1957. The two had three children: Brooks, Therese, and Virginia.

In 1948, Barnes began his higher education at Eastern Illinois University. Barnes transferred to the University of Michigan to study forestry at the then-called School of Natural Resources (now known as University of Michigan School for Environment and Sustainability). Upon graduating in 1952, Barnes promptly earned a master's in forestry in 1953, also from the University of Michigan. Barnes graduated from the U.S. Naval School of Music in August 1954, and earned the Schoen-René Fellowship, which facilitated his education at the University of Göttingen, from which he received his Ph.D. in 1959.

Barnes was a trombone player and he played trombone for the University of Michigan's orchestra and marching band under William Revelli. In the army, Barnes was a trombonist in the 158 Army Band, and he completed education with the U.S. Naval School of Music. Barnes' credentials in both music and forestry earned him the Schoen-René Fellowship, which allotted him funding for his Ph.D. Barnes' passion for music was shared with his wife, Lorena, who was an avid pianist.

== Career ==
During the summers of his undergraduate, Barnes worked for the United States Forest Service studying pines. After a period of time as a trombonist with the army, Barnes completed his Ph.D. and for a period traveled broadly, from Idaho to Germany, studying and developing various aspects of forest ecology.

Barnes returned to the University of Michigan in 1964, where he taught for 64 years. Barnes is distinguished for his creation and instruction of the "Woody Plants" course, a course which has strongly influenced many University of Michigan-educated botanists. As the botanist Anton Reznicek said in 2013 while presenting the Lifetime Achievement Award for the Michigan Botanical Society, "It sometimes seems like all the people at the Michigan Natural Features Inventory (MNFI) are Burt Barnes’ students! ... Burt is one of the giants of Michigan botany, and it is hard to think of anyone more deserving of this recognition." While Barnes made many contributions in terms of research and literature — such as the acclaimed Michigan Trees — he is consistently recognized for the impact of his instruction.

Barnes received many awards and honors throughout his career. Awards he received include the Schoen-René Fellowship, the Barrington Moore Memorial Award, the Calvin A. Schenck Award, and the status of National Science Foundation Research Scholar for scholarly communications with China. Additionally, the Sierra Club has an award in his honor, the Burton V. Barnes Award, which was established in 2004 to recognize academic excellence.
