= Louis Charles Karpinski =

American mathematician (1878–1956)

- Born: August 5, 1878; Rochester, New York, US
- Died: January 25, 1956 (aged 77)
- Occupation: Mathematician

Louis Charles Karpinski (5 August 1878 – 25 January 1956) was an American mathematician.

== Background ==
Louis Charles Karpinski was born on August 5, 1878, in Rochester, New York. His parents were Henry Hermanagle Karpinski of Warsaw, Poland and Mary Louise Engesser of Guebwiller, France. He earned his Bachelor of Arts at Cornell University in 1901 and his Ph.D. at Universität Straßburg in 1903.

== Career ==
At Columbia University, Karpinski became a fellow and a university extension lecturer. He taught at Berea College and at the Normal School in Oswego, New York, now SUNY Oswego. He then accepted a position at the University of Michigan, where he became a full professor of mathematics by 1919. He devoted his attention chiefly to the history and pedagogy of mathematics.

Karpinski served as the president of the History of Science Society from 1943 to 1944.

== Books ==
An authority on the history of science, Karpinski was collaborator on the Archivo di Storia della Scienza and author of The Hindu-Arabic Numerals with David Eugene Smith (1911), Robert of Chester's Latin Translation of the Algebra of Al-Khowarizmi (1915), and Unified Mathematics with Harry Yandell Benedict and John William Calhoun (1913).

- The Hindu-Arabic Numerals (with David Eugene Smith). Boston: Ginn and Company, 1911.
- Robert of Chester's Latin Translation of the Algebra of Al-Khowarizmi, with an Introduction, Critical Notes and an English Version. New York: Macmillan Co., 1915.
- Mathematical Pamphlets (n.p.): (n.p.), 1915.
- Unified Mathematics (with Harry Y. Benedict and John W. Calhoun). Boston: D.C. Heath and Company, 1918 and 1922.
- The History of Arithmetic Chicago: Rand McNally and Co., 1925.
- Bibliography of the Printed Maps of Michigan, 1804–1880. Lansing: Michigan Historical Commission, 1931.
- Historical Atlas of the Great Lakes and Michigan. Lansing: Michigan Historical Commission, 1931.
- Bibliography of Mathematical Works Printed in America through 1850. Ann Arbor: University of Michigan Press, 1940.

== See also ==
- Robert of Chester
- al-Khwārizmī
