= William C. Powers, Jr. Student Activity Center =

- Interactive map of the William C. Powers, Jr. Student Activity Center area

General information
- Location: Austin, Texas, United States
- Coordinates: 30.28479°N 97.73632°W

The William C. Powers, Jr. Student Activity Center (WCP) is a building on the University of Texas at Austin campus. Containing three floors, the WCP began being built in 2009 and became open in January 2011. Currently, it features a dining area on the ground floor. The building sits across from the Jackson Geological Sciences Building (JGB). The building is named after William Powers Jr., who served as the president of the university.
