= Lorene Rogers =

American biochemist

21st President of the University of Texas at Austin
- In office 1974–1979
- Preceded by: Stephen Hopkins Spurr
- Succeeded by: Peter T. Flawn

Personal details
- Born: April 3, 1914 Prosper, Texas
- Died: January 11, 2009 (aged 94) Dallas, Texas
- Education: University of North Texas; University of Texas at Austin
- Profession: Biochemistry

Lorene Lane Rogers (April 3, 1914 – January 11, 2009) was an American biochemist and educator who served as the 21st President of the University of Texas at Austin. She has been described as the first woman in the United States to lead a major research university.

== Early life and education ==
Born on April 3, 1914, in Prosper, Texas, as Lorene Lane, she was awarded a bachelor's degree from North Texas State Teachers College (now the University of North Texas), majoring in English. She met her husband, Burl Gordon Rogers, while an undergraduate. After graduating from North Texas, Rogers became a school teacher. Her husband, Burl Rogers, was a chemist. He had graduated from the University of North Texas in 1935 with a Bachelor of Science degree in chemistry and taught at the University of Texas until about 1940. Around that time, he accepted a job from a chemical company, General Aniline Works, in Linden, New Jersey, where, in 1941, he died from injuries of a laboratory explosion.

At a time when biochemistry was a "field dominated by men", Rogers decided to follow in her husband's footsteps, figuring that "if he liked chemistry so well, that she wanted to pursue it also." She earned a master's degree and a doctoral degree in biochemistry from the University of Texas at Austin and taught at Sam Houston State College (now Sam Houston State University) before returning to Austin, Texas.

== University career ==
Rogers had been a researcher at the University of Texas at Austin, but her application in 1962 for a teaching position was rejected, despite the fact that she had already taught courses in the chemistry department. She ultimately was given a position as a professor of nutrition in the university's home economics department, before becoming a full professor, assistant director of a biochemical institute, associate dean of graduate studies and vice president.

Rogers was named as interim president of the university in September 1974, succeeding Dr. Stephen H. Spurr, who had just been dismissed after becoming the school's fifth president in a six-year period. She became president in 1975, and was variously described as the first woman to be president of a major state university or was believed to be the first. Faculty members were critical of the appointment, claiming that they should have been involved in the selection process, and protest rallies were conducted by faculty and students demanding that she resign. President Rogers and the Board of Regents were the target of a 1975 lawsuit filed by Philip L. White and seven other UT Austin professors, who claimed that they had been denied raises as part of an effort to stifle their dissent, in violation of the First Amendment rights. She served as president of the university until 1979.

In a 1975 profile, Rogers described how she had "never been one who pushed ahead and scratched the walls trying to climb my way up". She stated that "I had no plans or ambitions to become a career woman. If my husband had lived, I probably would have been a housewife."

William C. Powers, president of The University of Texas at Austin at the time of her death, described how Rogers was "the first and only woman to serve as president of the university, a position she accepted under difficult circumstances. She was not afraid to make tough decisions."

Rogers served as a director of Texaco starting in 1976, serving until 1989.

Rogers died at age 94 on January 11, 2009, of natural causes in Dallas.

Academic offices
Preceded by Stephen H. Spurr	President of University of Texas at Austin; 1974-1979	Succeeded by Peter T. Flawn
