= Wallace L. Hall Jr. =

Board of Regent for the University of Texas System
- In office February 2011 – February 2017

Personal details
- Education: The University of Texas at Austin (1984)

Wallace L. Hall Jr. is an American investor who served a controversial six-year term as a member of the University of Texas System Board of Regents. Hall was appointed in February 2011 by Governor Rick Perry, and was replaced in February 2017.

Hall's appointment came in the midst of a struggle over the shape of higher education in Texas. Three years earlier, Governor Rick Perry had championed a plan to remake university education along business lines; this was the so-called "Seven Solutions" of Austin entrepreneur Jeff Sandefer. Hall's early days as a regent would witness this effort's failure, largely as a result of resistance spearheaded by supporters of UT Austin and Texas A&M University. In the wake of this failure, and although regents' duties call for attention to 15 separate institutions which make up the University of Texas System, Hall would spend much of his energy attempting to identify and unearth malpractice at the UT Austin flagship. He was the first regent to publicly raise concerns about external influence on the admissions process at the school. A state legislative committee subsequently initiated impeachment proceedings against him. The proceedings were eventually dropped but led to a censure by the committee for "misconduct, incompetency in the performance of official duties, or behavior unbefitting a nominee for and holder of a state office." In response Hall claimed "The committee's findings are based on distortions, untruths and intentional misrepresentations."

On February 12, 2015, an investigation ordered by UT System found that Bill Powers, the president of UT Austin, had repeatedly helped applicants, including some with questionable academic credentials, gain admission if they had been recommended by legislators and influential people. This was widely described as vindication of Hall and a validation of his concerns.

== Early life and career ==
In 1980, Hall graduated from the St. Mark's School of Texas. He has served as President of the school's alumni association and was a long time member on the school's board of trustees. He earned a bachelor's degree in Economics from the University of Texas at Austin in 1984.

He is the founder and President of Wetland Partners, LP, which operates Trinity River Mitigation Bank. Trinity River Mitigation is a wetlands bank created to mitigate U.S. Army Corps of Engineers (USACE) approved environmental impacts to the aquatic system as per the Clean Water Act. Environmentalists object that Hall's bank allows hydraulic fracking in environmentally sensitive areas. Hall had a 15-year career in the financial services industry, as a securities analyst, financial futures trader and as financial principal of a NASD broker-dealer. Hall's other business include oil and gas investments.

== Appointed to UT System Board of Regents ==
In August 2009, Hall was appointed by Governor Perry to the Texas Higher Education Coordinating Board.

In 2011 Governor Perry appointed Hall to the University of Texas System Board of Regents. In February 2011, Hall was unanimously confirmed as a Regent by the Texas Senate. The UT System Board of Regents oversees nine universities, including the flagship University of Texas at Austin, and six hospitals or medical institutions. The University of Texas System is one of the largest higher education organizations in the United States, its enrollment is more than 213,000 students and it has an annual operating budget of more than $14.6 billion. The System's nine regents are in charge of appointing the universities' presidents, approving budgets, creating new schools, and creating policies and procedures for the students and faculties. He is now Chairman of the Technology Transfer and Research Committee and is a member of the Audit, Compliance, and Management Review Committee and the Finance and Planning Committee. He is the Board's Liaison to the Governor's Office on Technology Transfer and Commercialization Issues.

== University of Texas at Austin investigations ==
After he was appointed in 2011, Hall began looking into what he believed to be administrative and management issues at The University of Texas at Austin. The investigations made three major findings:

- Undisclosed and unauthorized forgivable loans programs at UT School of Law
- Improper methods of reporting donations to UT Austin's capital fundraising campaign
- Legislative influence over admissions processes

Hall filed four open records requests with The University of Texas at Austin after his inquiries via his role as a Regent were delayed.

=== Forgivable Loans ===
Early in Hall's tenure on the board, an open records request filed by three law professors revealed details concerning a large private endowment used to provide off-the-books six-figure forgivable loans to certain faculty members. This had not been reported to the board and was out of sight of the university's formal compensation system. Hall wanted to know how large the forgivable loans were and who had decided who received them.

In March 2013, the Board of Regents voted to re-open the forgivable loans investigation rejecting and abandoning a previously prepared report by then UT System General Counsel Barry Burgdorf.

=== Legislative influence over admissions ===
Hall used Open Records requests to investigate whether the legislature had improperly used political influence in admissions, specifically at the law school. According to Texas Monthly, "The allegations set off an uproar, and most of the fury was directed at Hall himself. Politicians, fiercely loyal UT alumni, and some of Hall's fellow regents came to (University of Texas President) Powers's defense, claiming that Hall was carrying out what many of them described as a "witch hunt."

Ultimately, the System investigated the allegations. In a report, UT System Chancellor Francisco G. Cigarroa concluded, "A disproportionately high number of applicants were admitted notwithstanding the fact that most of the legislator letters did not contain any significant substantive information about the applicant," and "in more than one-half of them, there is no evidence that the author of the letter even knows the student, much less knows him or her well."

== Impeachment proceedings ==
A legislative effort was begun in June 2013 to impeach Hall from his position as regent for "misconduct, incompetency in the performance of official duties, or behavior unbefitting" a regent. Some legislators initially explained the impeachment on grounds that Hall did not disclose several lawsuits that he was involved in when he originally completed his Regent background check. Hall updated Governor Rick Perry's office in April 2013 with the full list. No unelected official in Texas has ever been successfully impeached or removed from office. Governor of Texas Rick Perry's spokesperson said the investigations send a "chilling message" to gubernatorial appointees. The Select Committee on Transparency in State Agency Operations began a yearlong, $500,000+ investigation into Wallace Hall. The most the select committee could do would be to recommend to the full House that articles of impeachment be drafted. If that had happened, then the House would follow procedures regarding calling a special session specifically for the process of impeachment.

The committee hired lawyer Rusty Hardin to serve as legal counsel for the committee. In July 2013, University of Texas Chancellor Francisco G. Cigarroa and Regent Eugene Powell responded to the ongoing investigation and negative remarks against Hall from some elected officials and University of Texas staff. Cigarroa said Hall was not allowed to access anything that was not reviewed by University lawyers to ensure they met federal privacy standards. During a September 2013 panel conversation with state senator Kirk Watson, Hall defended his investigations and criticized the impeachment proceedings.

=== Committee report ===
On April 7, 2014, the San Antonio Express-News and Houston Chronicle viewed an advance copy of Hardin's 176-page report. The report alleged that Hall broke state and federal law. The report referred to Hall's "burdensome" requests for records as one of the critiques laid out against the regent.

=== Reactions ===
The Wall Street Journal opined against Hall's impeachment in a May 11, 2014, op-ed. Although the committee left open the possibility of revisiting impeachment, an August 11, 2014, vote passed 6–1 to recommend that Hall be censured, bringing a close to the more than year-long process. In response to the censure vote, Governor of Texas Rick Perry issued a statement defending Hall's actions, saying that he believed his appointee acted in the best interest of Texas.

Meanwhile, UT System chancellor Francisco Cigarroa asked UT Austin President Bill Powers to resign or face termination at the July 10, 2014, The University of Texas System Board of Regents meeting. Cigarroa attributed the request to a "breakdown of communication, collegiality, trust and a willingness to work together for the good of the university." Powers at first indicated he would not resign, saying it would "cast the university and our state in a highly unfavorable light." However, on July 9, 2014, Cigarroa released a statement that Powers nevertheless agreed to resign effective June 2015. The Board meeting agenda indicated regents would discuss Powers in an executive session. Some legislators on the transparency committee sent a letter requesting that the Board of Regents delay any personnel decisions regarding Powers or other witnesses from the impeachment hearings.

In a July 2014 op-ed, the Wall Street Journal commented that Powers' resignation would bring more attention and scrutiny to the political favoritism scandals at The University of Texas at Austin. The editorial board wrote: "The voters seem to understand, even if some legislators don't, that college admissions are supposed to be based on merit, not political connections." Although the committee left open the possibility of revisiting impeachment, an August 11, 2014 vote passed 6–1 to recommend that Hall be censured, bringing a close to the more than year-long process. In response to the censure vote, Governor of Texas Rick Perry issued a statement defending Hall's actions, saying the regent acted in the best interest of Texas "in the face of withering personal attacks." Hall responded to the committee's recommendation by saying the committee had covered up its "improper interference in System operations" and had intimidated non-paid public servants.

== Investigation conclusion and response ==
On February 12, 2015 an investigation ordered by The University of Texas System found that Bill Powers, president of The University of Texas at Austin, had repeatedly helped applicants, including some with lesser academic credentials, gain admission if they had been recommended by legislators and influential people. According to the report, from 2009 to 2014, well connected students flagged by university officials were admitted 74 percent of the time compared to an overall admission rate of 40 percent. President Powers and his Chief of Staff "each failed to speak with candor and forthrightness expected of people in their positions of trust and leadership," the report stated.

This report was widely described as vindication of Hall, and a validation of the concerns he raised. Others have pointed out that such admissions procedures are widespread, even desirable, in American higher education.

== Recognition ==
Hall was named in December 2014 to the Chronicle of Higher Education's 2014 Influencers List. The same week as being named to the Chronicle Influencers List, Hall was named one of the nine finalists for "Texan of the Year" by The Dallas Morning News Hall was also awarded the Torch of Freedom Award in December 2014 by conservative lobbying group Empower Texans. Texas Monthly suggested that Hall was "Most Dangerous Man in Texas". On October 18, 2019, Hall received the Jerry L. Martin Prize for Excellence in College Trusteeship from the American Council of Trustees and Alumni.

== See also ==
- Notable alumni of St. Mark's School of Texas
