= University of Texas at Austin admissions controversy =

The University of Texas admissions controversy grew out of the investigations and public statements of a member of the University of Texas System Board of Regents. Wallace L. Hall Jr. was appointed to a six-year term in February 2011 by then Governor Rick Perry. Following his appointment, and in the wake of the failure of a campaign to remodel the University of Texas at Austin along business lines, Hall began broadly investigating the administrative dealings of President Bill Powers.

Hall was the first to publicly raise concerns about legislative influence on admissions at UT-Austin under President Powers' tenure. Following up on these concerns, the UT system launched a limited probe to determine whether legislators' application recommendations made directly to Powers were given special treatment. On February 12, 2015, this investigation found that Powers had helped certain applicants gain admission, including those with questionable academic credentials, if he felt that doing so was in the university's best interests. This was described by some as vindication of UT Regent Hall. Others have pointed out that such admissions procedures are widespread, even desirable, in American higher education.

According to the report, from 2009 to 2014, students flagged by university officials were admitted 74% of the time compared to an overall admission rate of 40%. President Powers and his Chief of Staff "each failed to speak with candor and forthrightness expected of people in their positions of trust and leadership," the report stated. Powers agreed to step down in June 2013, partly in response to the probe. He told The Wall Street Journal that he had "intervened on behalf of a relatively small number of students" but denied that it was "undue influence".
