= Norman Hackerman =

American chemist, professor, and university president (1912–2007)

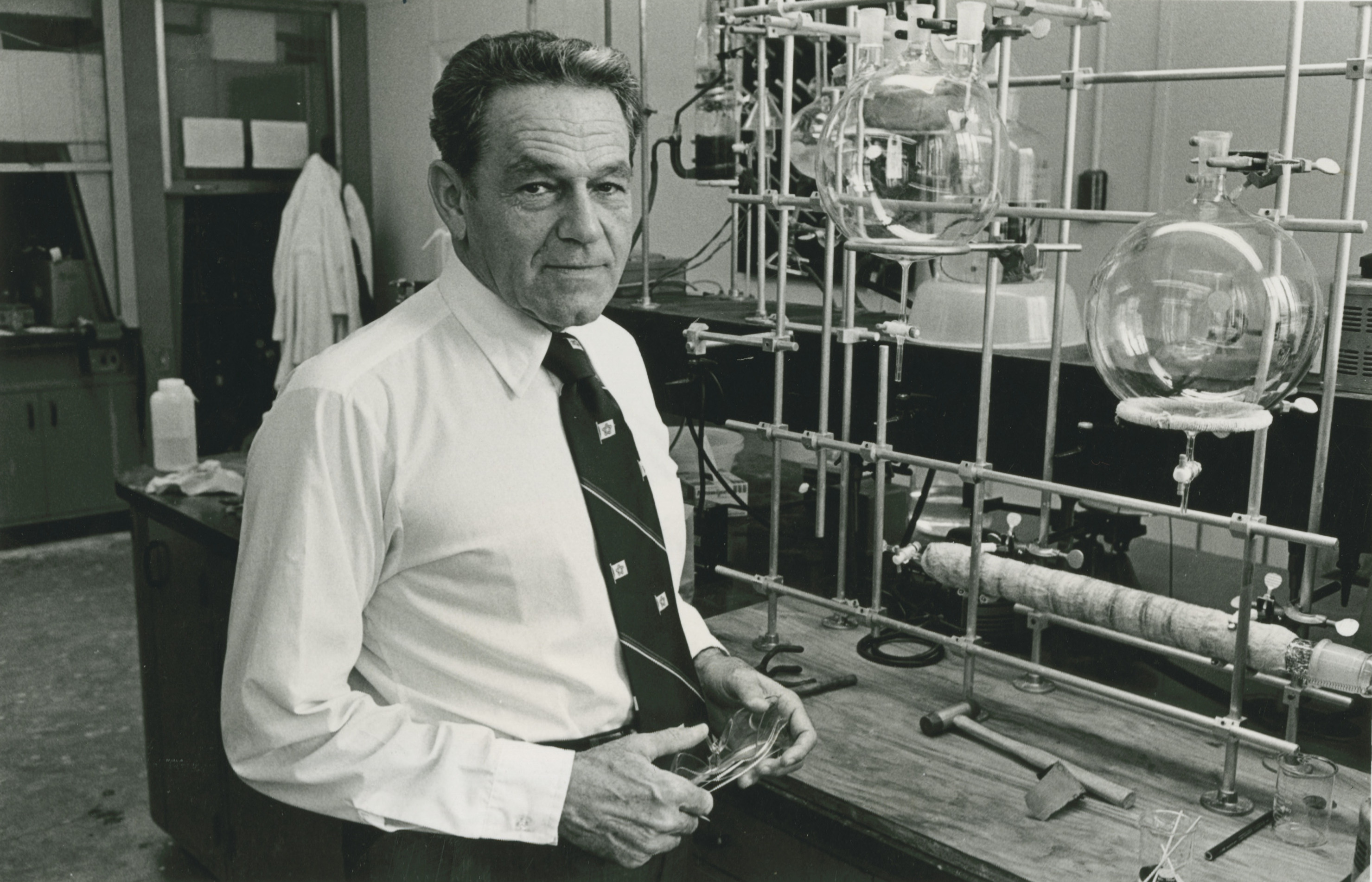
- Hackerman in 1985

18th President of the University of Texas at Austin
- In office 1967–1970
- Preceded by: Harry Ransom
- Succeeded by: Bryce Jordan

4th President of Rice University
- In office 1970–1985
- Preceded by: Kenneth Pitzer
- Succeeded by: George Rupp

Personal details
- Born: March 2, 1912 Baltimore, Maryland, U.S.
- Died: June 16, 2007 (aged 95) Temple, Texas, U.S.
- Spouse: Gene Coulbourn (died 2002)
- Children: 4
- Occupation: Chemist; teacher; researcher; university president
- Known for: Electrochemistry of oxidation
- Awards: Vannevar Bush Award (1993); National Medal of Science (1993)
- Scientific career
- Education: Johns Hopkins University (BS, PhD)
- Fields: Chemistry
- Workplaces: Johns Hopkins University; Loyola College; Virginia Polytechnic Institute and State University; University of Texas at Austin; Rice University
- Thesis: A study of the effect of solvent and concentration on the molecular weight of sulfur monochloride (1935)
- Doctoral advisor: Walter Albert Patrick

Norman Hackerman (March 2, 1912 – June 16, 2007) was an American chemist, professor, and academic administrator who served as the 18th President of the University of Texas at Austin (1967–1970) and later as the 4th President of Rice University (1970–1985). He was an internationally known expert in metals corrosion.

== Biography ==
Born in Baltimore, Maryland, he was the only son of Jacob Hackerman and Anna Raffel, immigrants from the Baltic regions of the Russian Empire that later became Estonia and Latvia, respectively.

Hackerman earned his bachelor's degree in 1932 and his doctor's degree in chemistry in 1935 from Johns Hopkins University. He taught at Johns Hopkins, Loyola College in Baltimore and the Virginia Polytechnic Institute and State University in Blacksburg, Virginia, before working on the Manhattan Project in World War II.

He joined the University of Texas in 1945 as an assistant professor of chemistry, became an associate professor in 1946, a full professor in 1950, a department chair in 1952, dean of research in 1960, vice president and provost in 1961, and vice chancellor for academic affairs for the University of Texas System in 1963. Hackerman left the University of Texas in 1970 for Rice, where he retired 15 years later. He was named professor emeritus of chemistry at the University of Texas in 1985 and taught classes until the end of his life.

He was a member of the National Academy of Sciences, the American Philosophical Society, and the American Academy of Arts and Sciences. Among his many honors are the Olin Palladium Award of the Electrochemical Society, the Gold Medal of the American Institute of Chemists (1978), the Charles Lathrop Parsons Award, the Vannevar Bush Award and the National Medal of Science. He was awarded the Acheson Award by the Electrochemical Society in 1984.

Hackerman served on advisory committees and boards of several technical societies and government agencies, including the National Science Board, the Texas Governor's Task Force on Higher Education and the Scientific Advisory Board of the Welch Foundation. He also served as editor of the Journal of the Electrochemical Society and as president of the Electrochemical Society.

== Family ==
Hackerman's wife of 61 years, Gene Coulbourn, died in 2002; they had three daughters and one son.

== Legacy ==
In 1982 The Electrochemical Society created the Norman Hackerman Young Author Award to honor the best paper published in the Journal of the Electrochemical Society for a topic in the field of electrochemical science and technology by a young author or authors. In 2000 the Welch Foundation created the Norman Hackerman Award in Chemical Research to recognize the work of young researchers in Texas. The Rice Board of Trustees established the Norman Hackerman Fellowship in Chemistry in honor of Hackerman's 90th birthday in 2002. In 2008, the original Experimental Science Building at the University of Texas at Austin campus was demolished and rebuilt as the Norman Hackerman Experimental Science Building in his name and honor. The building was completed in late 2010, with the opening and dedication ceremony on March 2, 2011, which was both Hackerman's 99th Birthday and the 175th Anniversary of Texas Independence. The main building at the J. Erik Jonsson Center of the National Academy of Sciences is Hackerman House, named in his honor. Hackerman House overlooks Quissett Harbor in Woods Hole MA, on Cape Cod.

== See also ==
- History of the Jews in Houston

Academic offices
Preceded by Harry Ransom	President of University of Texas at Austin; 1967–1970	Succeeded by Bryce Jordan
Preceded by Kenneth Sanborn Pitzer	President of Rice University; 1970–1985	Succeeded by George Erik Rupp
