= William H. Cunningham =

American academic administrator (born 1944)

23rd President of the University of Texas at Austin
- In office September 1, 1985 – August 31, 1992
- Preceded by: Peter T. Flawn
- Succeeded by: William S. Livingston

Personal details
- Born: 1944 (age 81–82)

William H. Cunningham (born 1944) is an American academic administrator, a university faculty member and a business executive. He served as the 23rd president of the University of Texas at Austin from 1985 to 1992. He served as the seventh chancellor of the 15-campus University of Texas System from 1992 to 2000. He holds the James L. Bayless Chair for Free Enterprise at UT Austin's McCombs School of Business, and he is a director of Southwest Airlines. and other companies.
