= Larry Faulkner =

American electrochemist and academic

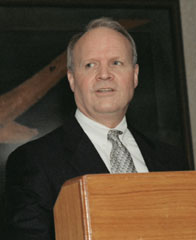
- Larry Faulkner presenting at the May 10, 2004 Fulbright Foreign Scholarship Board meeting

27th President of the University of Texas at Austin
- In office April 13, 1998 – February 1, 2006
- Preceded by: Peter T. Flawn (ad interim)
- Succeeded by: William C. Powers

Personal details
- Born: November 26, 1944 (age 81) Shreveport, Louisiana
- Education: Southern Methodist University (BS); University of Texas at Austin (PhD)

Academic work
- Discipline: Chemistry
- Institutions: Harvard University; University of Illinois at Urbana–Champaign; University of Texas at Austin

Larry Ray Faulkner (born November 26, 1944) is an American academic and businessman. He served as the twenty-seventh president of The University of Texas at Austin from 1998 to 2006, and as the president of the Houston Endowment Inc. from 2006 to 2012.

== Biography ==
=== Early life ===
Originally from Shreveport, Louisiana, Faulkner obtained his Bachelor of Science degree in chemistry at Southern Methodist University in 1966 and his Ph.D. in chemistry from the University of Texas at Austin.

=== Career ===
He taught chemistry at the University of Texas, the University of Illinois, and Harvard University. He served as provost and vice chancellor for academic affairs at the University of Illinois. He served as president of the University of Texas at Austin from 1998 to 2006. On June 30, 2005, he announced that he would step down from his post in the spring of 2006. In December 2005, William C. Powers was officially named his successor and took office in February 2006. On February 9, 2006, The University of Texas System Board of Regents named Faulkner president emeritus, one of the system's highest distinctions. From 2006 to 2008, he chaired the National Mathematics Advisory Panel, a panel appointed by President George W. Bush to advise the President and the United States Secretary of Education on the best use of scientifically based research to advance the teaching and learning of mathematics. The final report of this panel, Foundations for Success, was released on March 13, 2008. The impact of this report on the writing of the Common Core State Standards for Mathematics can be seen in the latter's treatment of algebra. On August 13, 2010, the University of Texas at Austin's nanoscience building was named the Larry R. Faulkner Nano Science and Technology Building by the UT System Board of Regents in recognition of former president Faulkner's leadership in bringing the university's nanotechnology program to national prominence.

He sat on the board of directors of Guaranty Bank from December 2007 to August 2009, and of Temple-Inland from August 2005 to February 2012. He serves on the board of ExxonMobil.

== Honors and awards ==
- 2000 Acheson Award by the Electrochemical Society
- 1993 Elected Fellow of The Electrochemical Society

== Notes ==
1. Young, Meghan (February 10, 2005). "Regents focus on grad rates". The Daily Texan.

== Bibliography ==
- Bard, Allen J.; Faulkner, Larry R.; White, Henry S. (2022). Electrochemical Methods: Fundamentals and Applications, 3rd Edition. Wiley. p. 864. ISBN 978-1-119-33406-4.

Academic offices
Preceded by Peter Tyrrell Flawn	President of University of Texas at Austin; 1998-2006	Succeeded by William C. Powers
