= Walter Marshall William Splawn =

American lawyer

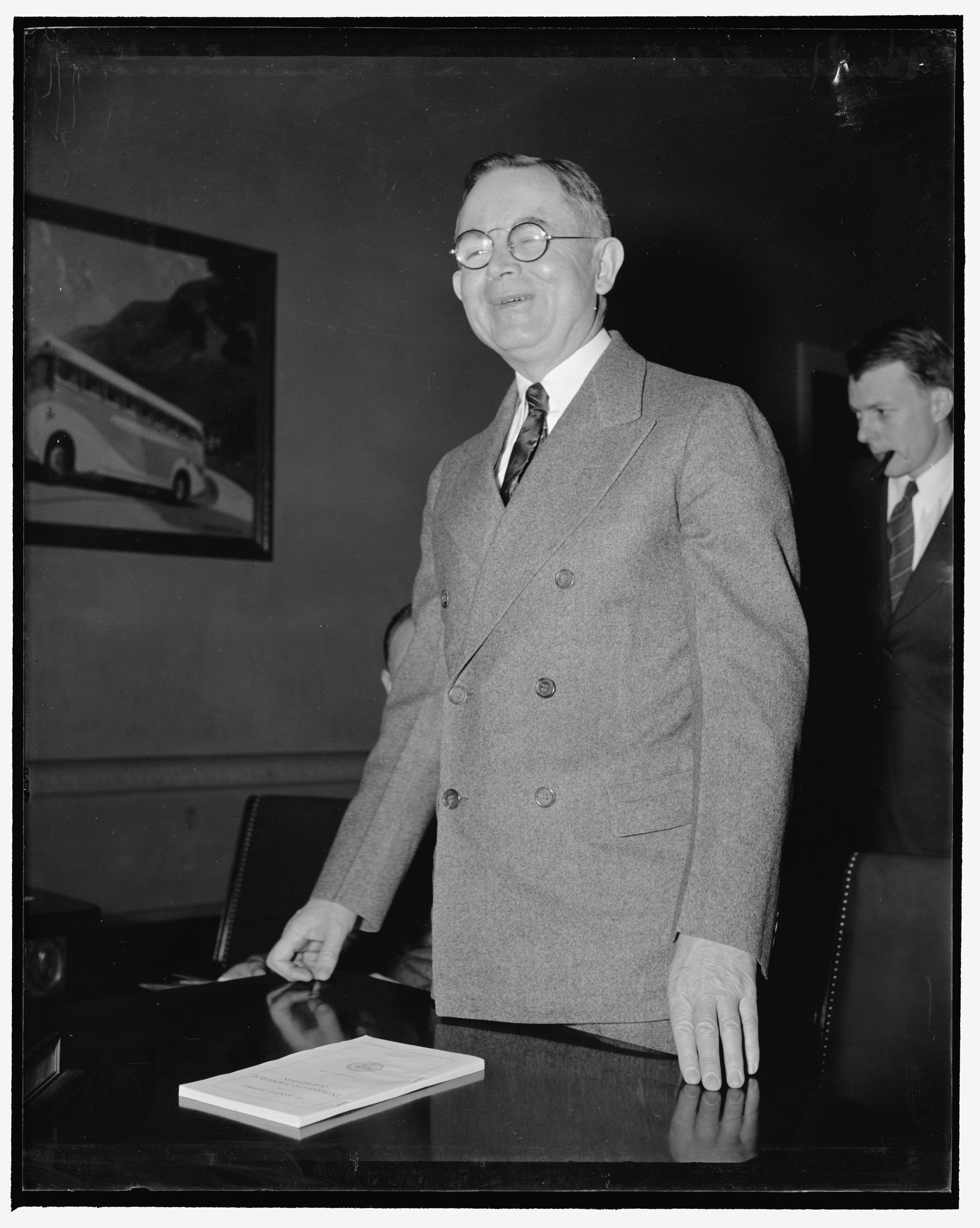

9th President of the University of Texas at Austin
- In office August 1, 1924 – September 1, 1927
- Preceded by: William Seneca Sutton
- Succeeded by: Harry Yandell Benedict

Railroad Commissioner of Texas
- In office March 1, 1923 – August 1, 1924
- Governor: Pat Morris Neff
- Preceded by: Earle B. Mayfield
- Succeeded by: C. V. Terrell

Personal details
- Born: June 16, 1883 Arlington, Texas, U.S.
- Died: January 17, 1963 (aged 79) Washington, D.C., U.S.
- Education: Baylor University (BA); Yale University (MA)

Walter Marshall William Splawn (June 16, 1883 – January 17, 1963) was an American lawyer and economist.

== Early life and education ==
Splawn was an Arlington, Texas, native, born to William Butler and Mary Marshall (Collins) Splawn on June 16, 1883. He graduated from Baylor University in 1906 with a bachelor's of arts degree. Splawn taught at his alma mater from 1910 to 1912, then began the practice of law in Fort Worth, Texas. He earned a master's of arts degree at Yale University in 1914, and returned to teach at Baylor in 1916.

== Career ==
In 1919, Splawn joined the University of Texas at Austin faculty. While teaching economics in Austin, Splawn completed a doctorate at the University of Chicago in 1921. In 1923, Splawn was appointed to the Railroad Commission of Texas by Pat Morris Neff. The next year, Splawn was selected to succeed interim William Seneca Sutton as president of the University of Texas at Austin, though he was the second choice of the University of Texas Board of Regents. After leaving Austin in 1928, Splawn served as dean of the graduate school of American University, in Washington, D.C., between 1929 and 1934.

Splawn served on the federal War Claims Commission as referee in 1927, and concurrently led the Board of Arbitration of Western Railroads and Group of Employees as chairman. Between 1928 and 1930, Splawn mediated disputes heard within the purview of the War Claims Act. In the 1930s, Splawn served as counsel to the United States House of Representatives' Committee on Interstate and Foreign Commerce. Splawn grew close to representative Sam Rayburn, and was subsequently appointed to the Interstate Commerce Commission between 1934 and 1953. Splawn died in Washington, D.C., on January 17, 1963, aged 79, and was buried in Lincoln, Virginia.
