= Richard W. Lariviere =

American academic

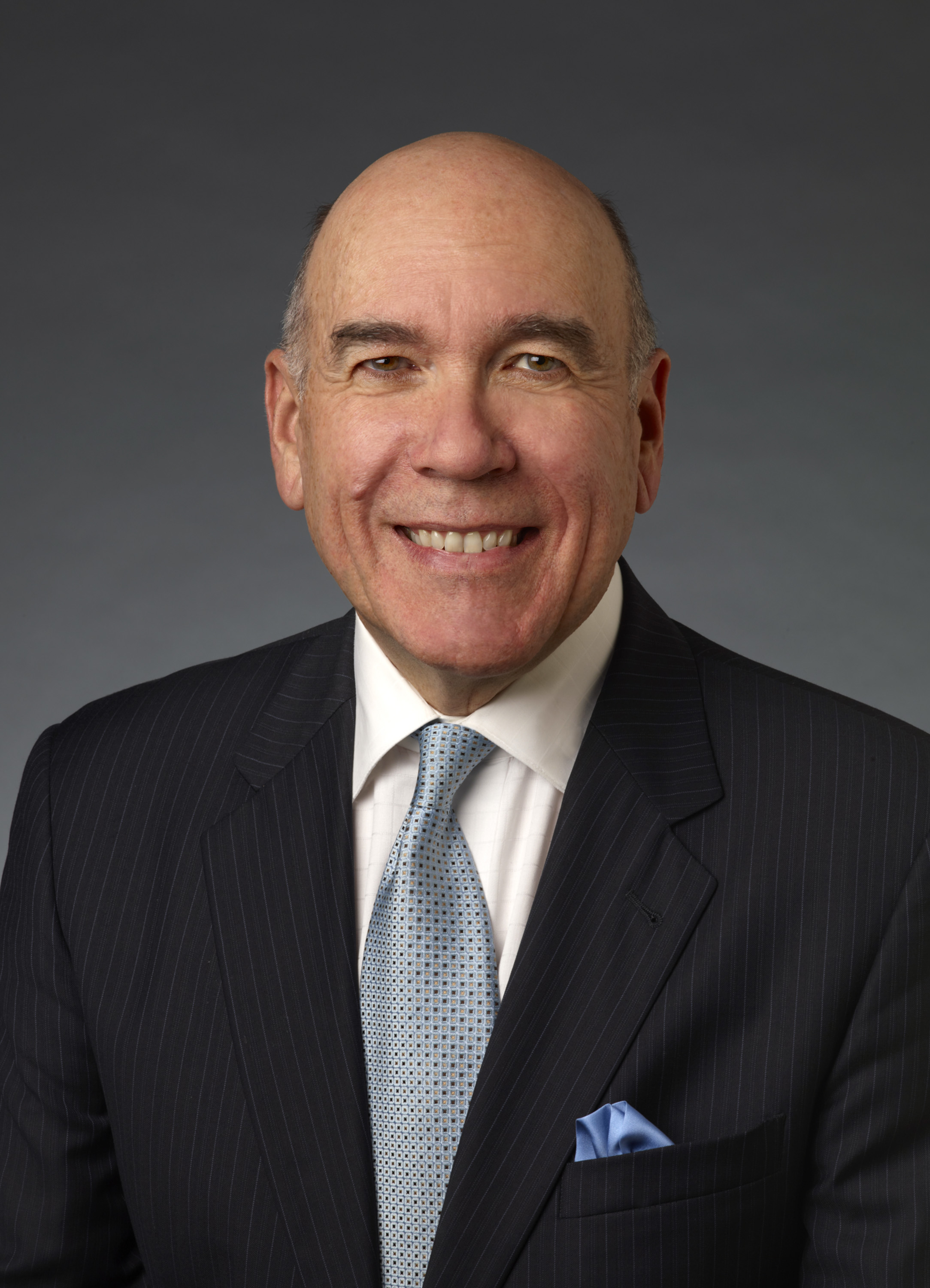
- Born: Chicago, Illinois, US
- Spouse: Janis Worcester (1971–present)

Academic background
- Education: University of Iowa (BA) (1972); University of Pennsylvania (PhD) (1978)

Richard W. Lariviere is a Sanskrit scholar and academic administrator. He served as the president of the University of Oregon from July 2009 until November 2011. From October 2012 until August 2020 he was the president of the Field Museum in Chicago, Illinois.

== Early life and education ==
Lariviere was born in Chicago and grew up in Marshalltown, Iowa. He earned a B.A. in History of Religion from the University of Iowa in 1972, where he was a member of Phi Beta Kappa. In 1978, he earned his Doctorate in Sanskrit from the University of Pennsylvania. After spending time in India, Lariviere built an academic career around the country’s languages, histories, religions, and culture. He has published articles and books on Indian culture and legal history. He reads eight languages and speaks French and Hindi. He has conducted research in London, Oxford, Calcutta, Poona, Kathmandu, Paris, Tokyo, Beijing, Lahore, Munich, Colombo and Madras, and other cities.

== Career ==
Lariviere was the president of the University of Oregon (UO) from July 1, 2009 through November 2011. During his tenure there, he advocated for the reform of Oregon's higher education system. His termination by the Board resulted in significant reform of higher education governance in Oregon.

Before arriving at Oregon, Lariviere was executive vice chancellor and provost at the University of Kansas from 2006 to 2009, and dean of the College of Liberal Arts at the University of Texas at Austin from 1999 to 2006. Lariviere also served as the inaugural associate vice president for international programs at UT Austin.

Additionally, Lariviere has had a successful career as a consultant for American and Indian companies in information technology and business process outsourcing. He also served on corporate boards in the IT industry in Europe and India.

On October 1, 2012 he became president and CEO of the Field Museum, where he served until his retirement in August 2020.

== Recognitions and awards ==
Lariviere is a life Member of the Council on Foreign Relations, a Fellow of the Royal Asiatic Society of Great Britain, a life Member of the American Oriental Society, life member of the Philosophical Society of Texas, a life member of NAACP, and a Founding Member of the Society for Design and Process Science. He has earned several awards for outstanding contributions, including the Margaret C. Berry Award in 2004 and the Eyes of Texas Award in 2004 and 1993. He was selected by the Royal Dutch Academy to give the annual Gonda Lecture in 1994, and the Collège de France honored him with the status of Professeur Etranger in 1996. In 1989, his book on Indian legal procedure was selected as the best book of the year on South Asia by the CESMEO Institute in Torino, Italy. In Chicago he was a member of the Economic Club of Chicago, the Commercial Club of Chicago, and the Chicago Club. He was given the NAACP Community Service award in 2011 and the Chancellor's Award from the University of Illinois at Chicago in 2015. In 2019 he was elected to the American Academy of Arts and Sciences.

Academic offices
Preceded by Dave Frohnmayer	President of the University of Oregon; 2009–2011	Succeeded by Robert M. Berdahl; Interim
