= William S. Livingston =

Acting President of the University of Texas at Austin
- In office September 1992 – January 1993
- Preceded by: William H. Cunningham
- Succeeded by: Robert M. Berdahl

Personal details
- Born: July 1, 1920 Ironton, Ohio, United States
- Died: August 15, 2013 (aged 93) Austin, Texas, United States
- Spouse: Lana Sanor
- Children: Stephen and David Livingston
- Education: Ohio State University; Yale University
- Website: Office of the Senior Vice President

William Samuel Livingston (July 1, 1920 – August 15, 2013) was a political science professor who was the acting president of the University of Texas at Austin, a position he held from 1992 until 1993. Born in Ironton, Ohio, Livingston fought in World War II as a first lieutenant and was awarded the Bronze Star and the Purple Heart. In 1943 he obtained bachelor's and master's degrees from Ohio State University before transferring to Yale University, where he was awarded a PhD in 1950.

Livingston joined the University of Texas at Austin in 1949 and stayed with the political science faculty until his retirement in 2007. During his tenure, he received Ford and Guggenheim Fellowships, chaired two departments, developed numerous programs and served as Dean of the Graduate School and acting president of the University of Texas at Austin. In 1995 he was made senior vice president of the university.

Livingston was the editor-in-chief of The Journal of Politics and president of Pi Sigma Alpha. Among his numerous awards was the American Political Science Association's Daniel Elazar Award, an organization on whose council he had served twice. Since 2004, the William S. Livingston Outstanding Graduate Student Academic Employee Award has recognized exemplary graduate student employees.

== Early life ==
William Livingston was born on July 1, 1920, in Ironton, Ohio. He graduated from Ohio State University with a bachelor's degree and Phi Beta Kappa honors in 1943, before getting his master's degree at the university in the same year. After his service in World War II he studied at Yale University, where he obtained a Ph.D. in political science in 1950.

He served as a field artillery officer, in the capacity of First Lieutenant, during World War II. Fighting in Europe, he earned both the Bronze Star and the Purple Heart. After the war, he married Lana Sanor and had two sons with her, Stephen and David.

== Academic and administrative career ==
In 1949, Livingston joined the faculty of the political science department at the University of Texas at Austin. He began by teaching courses in American and British government, as well as comparative politics. He received a one-year Ford Foundation Fellowship in 1952 and a Guggenheim Fellowship in 1959, the same year he won the University of Texas Student Association's "Teaching Excellence Award." He lectured at Yale University in the 1955–56 academic year and at Duke University in the 1960–61 academic year. In 1982 he was named to the Jo Anne Christian Professorship in British Studies, a seat that, as of 2008, he continues to hold. During his tenure at the University of Texas at Austin, he wrote or edited six books and at least twenty-five articles on political science topics. He was also the voice of "TEX", the university's telephonic registration system (Telephone Enrollment eXchange).

In 1954 he was made assistant dean of the graduate school at the University of Texas, a position that he held until 1958. He later became the vice president and dean of graduate students in 1979, an appointment that lasted until 1995. He was the graduate adviser for the Government Department from 1958 until 1967 and its chair from 1966 through 1969. He became the vice chancellor for academic programs of the University of Texas System for the 1969–70 academic year. He chaired the comparative studies program from 1978 to 1979 and spent six years as the chairman for the Faculty Senate.

In the 1960s he chaired the committee that helped establish the Lyndon B. Johnson School of Public Affairs. In addition, he helped develop the James A. Michener Center for Writers, the Normandy Scholars Program, the Edward A. Clark Center for Australian and New Zealand Studies, and the Faculty Seminar on British Studies. He also was instrumental in forming the Graduate Assembly for faculty members. From September 1992 through January 1993, while still the dean of graduate studies, he was named the acting president of University of Texas at Austin. After his retirement from the former position, he was made senior vice president of the university.

== Later life ==
Livingston has been the president of both the Southern Political Science Association and the Southwestern Social Science Association, and for four years he was the chief editor for The Journal of Politics. From 1980 until 1982 he was the National President of the political science honor society, Pi Sigma Alpha. Livingston has won several university-based awards, including the Pro Bene Meritis Award from the College of Liberal Arts (1992) and the Award of Distinction from the Parent's Association (1994), and was recognized as a University Distinguished Educator by the Ex-Students' Association, followed by the second "Distinguish Service Award" in the organization's history. The Conference of Southern Graduate Schools honored his "Distinguished Service to Graduate Education" in 1995, which was followed a year later by the Texas Association of Graduate Schools' President's Award for Distinguished Service. In 2005 he received a Presidential Citation for "extraordinary contributions to The University of Texas at Austin." On September 2, 2006, he received the American Political Science Association's Daniel Elazar Award for his work on federalism and intergovernmental relations, an organization on whose council he had served twice.

Livingston's successor, Robert M. Berdahl, referred to him as "the conscience, the soul, the memory, the wit, and the wise elder statesman" of the University of Texas. Since 2004, the William S. Livingston Outstanding Graduate Student Academic Employee Award has recognized "outstanding performance by graduate student academic employees." Livingston retired from the University of Texas on August 31, 2007, at the age of 87, and died at a retirement home in Austin on August 15, 2013.

Academic offices
Preceded by William H. Cunningham	President of University of Texas at Austin (Acting); 1992 – 1993	Succeeded by Robert M. Berdahl
