= William Powers Jr. =

American attorney, 28th president of the University of Texas at Austin

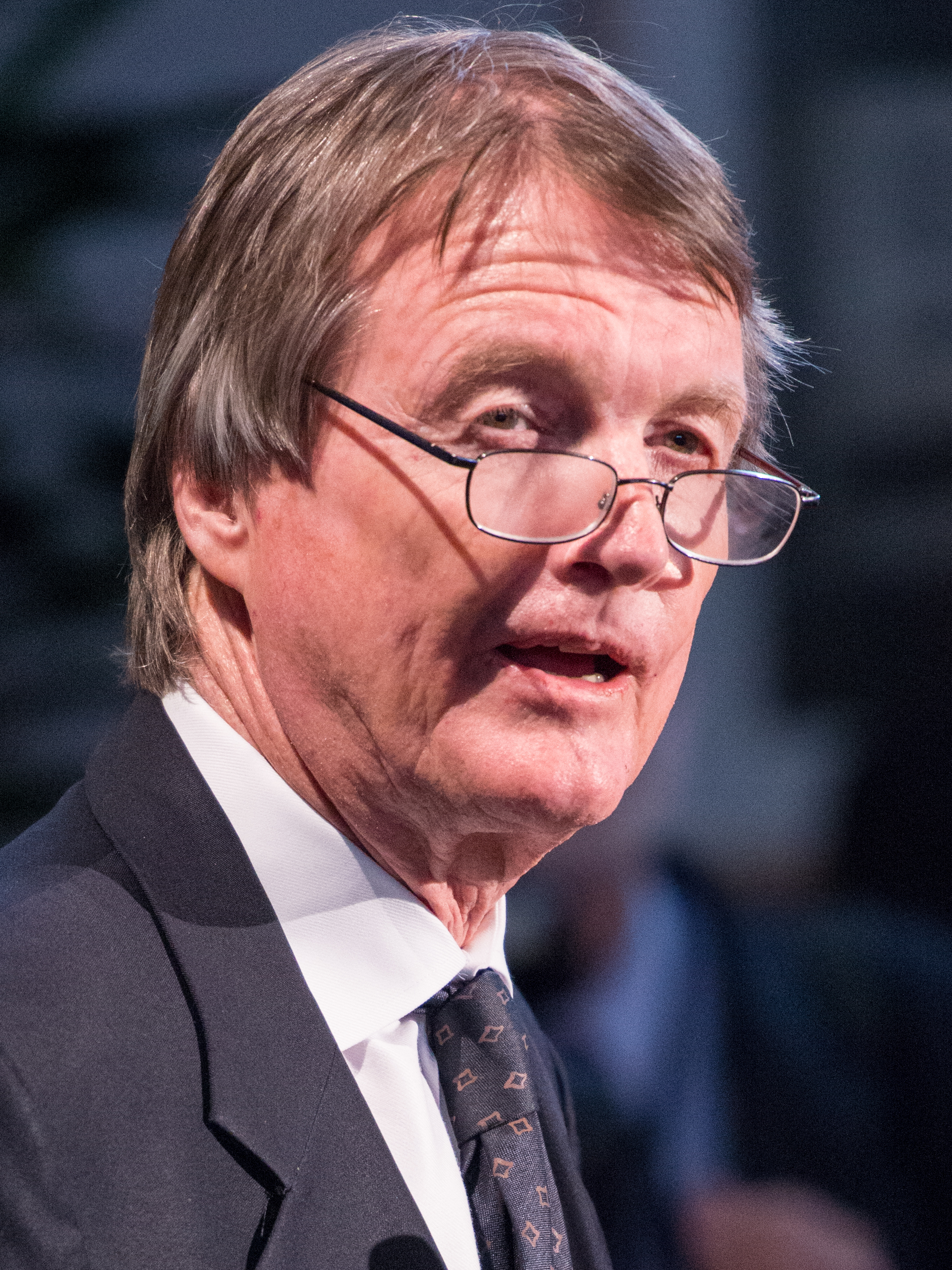
- Powers in 2014

28th President of the University of Texas at Austin
- In office February 1, 2006 – July 2, 2015
- Preceded by: Larry Faulkner
- Succeeded by: Gregory L. Fenves

Personal details
- Born: William Charles Powers Jr. May 30, 1946 Los Angeles, California, U.S.
- Died: March 10, 2019 (aged 72) Austin, Texas, U.S.
- Education: University of California, Berkeley (BA); Harvard University (JD)
- Profession: Lawyer, academic

William Charles Powers Jr. (May 30, 1946 – March 10, 2019) was an American attorney, academic, and university administrator who served as the 28th president of the University of Texas at Austin, becoming the second-longest serving president in the university's history. He held the position from February 1, 2006, to July 2, 2015, when he was succeeded by Gregory L. Fenves. Before his death, Powers held the Hines H. Baker and Thelma Kelley Baker Chair at the University of Texas School of Law.

Powers was selected in November 2005 as the sole finalist for the position of president of the University of Texas at Austin. In December 2005, he was officially named president of the university and succeeded Larry Faulkner when he left office in February 2006. Prior to his appointment, he had served as dean of the University of Texas School of Law since 2000. Powers resigned the presidency in June 2015, partly as the result of external pressures regarding admissions practices at the university.

== Education ==
Powers obtained his B.A. in chemistry at the University of California, Berkeley, and his J.D. from Harvard Law School. During his undergraduate years at Berkeley, he became a member of the Sigma Chi fraternity, and at Harvard he was managing editor of the Harvard Law Review.

== Employment ==
Powers also worked at Southern Methodist University, the University of Michigan, and the University of Washington. Powers was a former member of the Enron Corporation board of directors and chaired the Special Investigative Committee to investigate the causes of Enron's bankruptcy. He was also a member of the board of trustees of Austin Presbyterian Theological Seminary from 2004 to 2010.

Powers has authored several law texts, including:

- Cases and Materials in Products Liability
- Cases and Materials in Torts
- Texas Products Liability Law

Powers was a member of the American Law Institute and served as the Reporter on several of the Restatements of the Law, Torts:

- Restatement of the Law Third, Torts: Apportionment of Liability
- Restatement of the Law Third, Torts: Liability for Physical Harm
- Restatement of the Law Third, Torts: Concluding Provisions

In 2008, Powers was appointed to the rank of Chevalier de la Légion d'honneur in France's orders of chivalry. In 2012, he became vice chair of the Association of American Universities and became chair of the organization on October 22, 2013. He was a member of Westminster Presbyterian Church in Austin.

== University of Texas at Austin ==
While president, Powers oversaw the reform of the undergraduate curriculum and the founding of both the school of undergraduate studies and the Dell Medical School. An eight-year fundraising project he spearheaded called the Campaign for Texas raised $3.12 billion for the university. During his tenure the university also completed or began construction on 13 new buildings.

Despite his successes, Powers's final four years were marked by growing opposition to the status quo in higher education in Austin. A group of regents appointed by then-Governor Rick Perry attempted to instantiate the "Seven Breakthrough Solutions" of Austin entrepreneur Jeff Sandefer. Sandefer's ideas for the restructuring of the university were thought by many to be inimical to its research mission. Perry had endorsed the "seven solutions" at a private meeting attended by two of his appointed regents at the Texas Public Policy Foundation in 2008. In the face of mounting pressure from the board of regents to implement Sandefer's program, Powers remained steadfast in his support for the university's traditional role and shape. Such actions made him a target of various reformers, and at the same time an admired figure within the higher education community: Powers was elected to chair the Association of American Universities in 2013.

Soon after the 2011 appointment of regent Wallace L. Hall Jr., a college friend of Sandefer's, Powers became the focus of multiple investigations by Hall. Hall's interests as a regent centered largely on Powers's role as leader of its flagship campus in Austin, even though the University of Texas System includes fourteen institutions. Having probed accounting procedures in its capital campaign and a forgivable loan program administered by a private foundation in support of its law school faculty, Hall turned his attention to external influence on admissions at the university. A series of document requests revealed that powerful individuals often sought to obtain favoritism toward various applicants, and sometimes succeeded. In May 2014, a blog post reported that various regents had asked then UT System Chancellor Francisco Cigarroa to fire Powers. Almost immediately, a grassroots campaign arose in his support. A Facebook group named "I Stand With Bill Powers" attracted nearly 10,000 members.

=== Resignation ===
On July 4, 2014, an anonymous source reported that UT System Chancellor Francisco Cigarroa had asked Powers to resign, prior to the impending meeting of the board of regents, or face termination. The Board meeting agenda indicated regents would discuss Powers in an executive session. Cigarroa attributed the request to a "breakdown of communication, collegiality, trust and a willingness to work together for the good of the university." Powers at first indicated he would not resign, saying it would "cast the university and our state in a highly unfavorable light." However, on July 9, 2014, Cigarroa released a statement that Powers nevertheless agreed to resign effective June 2015.

On February 12, 2015, an investigation ordered by the University of Texas found that Powers had helped certain applicants, including those with lesser academic credentials, gain admission if they had been recommended by legislators and influential people. According to the report, from 2009 to 2014, well-connected students flagged by university officials were admitted 74% of the time compared to an overall admission rate of 40%. President Powers and his Chief of Staff "each failed to speak with candor and forthrightness expected of people in their positions of trust and leadership," the report stated. Powers agreed to step down in June 2014. He told the Wall Street Journal that he had "intervened on behalf of a relatively small number of students" but denied that it was "undue influence." Subsequently, the Austin American-Statesman determined that, as Chancellor, Cigarroa had participated in this selfsame aspect of the admissions process, sometimes making notes on the letters about the status of the individuals requesting special consideration in admissions.

== Personal life ==
Powers was first married to Karen Devendorf. They had two children and the marriage ended in divorce. He then married Kim Heilbrun, his wife of 36 years; they had three children together. He died on March 10, 2019, in Austin from complications from a fall several months earlier and from oculopharyngeal muscular dystrophy, a rare adult-onset muscle disorder. He is survived by all five children, as well as 6 grandchildren.

Academic offices
Preceded by Larry R. Faulkner	President of University of Texas at Austin; 2006–2015	Succeeded by Gregory L. Fenves
