= Philip L. White =

American historian

Philip Lloyd "Phil" White (July 31, 1923 – October 15, 2009) was an American history academic and civil community organizer. A tenured professor of early American history at the University of Texas at Austin (UT Austin) from the 1960s through 2000, White is acknowledged by many citizens of Austin, Texas, to have been a primary architect of "the Democratic grass-roots political activism that transformed Austin politics in the late 1960s and early 1970s".

== Early life ==
In New York City, White had been a community organizer with the West Side (Manhattan) branch of Americans for Democratic Action, while earning a PhD in colonial American history at Columbia University under the supervision of Allan Nevins. White essentially brought neighborhood civic groups to the American South.

== People's Republic ==
According to long-time Austin political consultant Peck Young, a former University of Texas student and White mentee circa 1968–71, Prof. White "made it possible for a lot of people to be elected and to do things to change this city" (Austin), from being "a Confederate capital into being something more progressive." Between 1968 and 1971, Prof. White founded the Tarrytown Democrats and the West Austin Democrats and served as Faculty Advisor to the UT Young Democrats. During this period, he also served on the Travis County Democratic Executive Committee and chaired the UT Department of History during the summer months. He was thus in a rare position to oversee both the nascent neighborhood groups and the new student movements that were then forming in the wake of widespread Civil Rights and Vietnam War protests. Even before the adoption of the 26th Amendment in 1971, a "first-ever political coalition" in Austin had been formed, joining "white liberals, minorities and students who had not been politically active before" in an amalgamation that opened up the city's formerly elitist politics.

Peck Young, who became director of the Center for Public Policy & Political Studies at Austin Community College, stated that White provided vital support within the university for his group's registration of more than 40,000 new student voters in central Austin from 1971 to 1972 (in a city of then only approximately 250,000 people, and less than 100,000 regular voters). From approximately 1970–75, local school board, city council, judicial, and state legislature offices changed, until nearly all elected offices in Travis County were in the hands of the new coalition, and other Texans started to refer to the state capital as "the People's Republic of Austin". In addition to Mr. Young, Prof. White advised a generation of Texas liberals hailing from UT Austin circa 1970, including Gonzalo Barrientos, Sarah Weddington, Ronnie Earle, Bruce Elfant, Larry Bales, and (future US Congressman) Lloyd Doggett.

== University pay dispute ==
Due to family concerns, White had largely faded out of county politics by the mid-1970s, although he continued advising student political groups and organizing the Texas Association of College Teachers (TACT). It was also during the early-to-mid-'70s that the University of Texas Board of Regents shifted from the Chairmanship of Frank Erwin to that of former Texas governor Allan Shivers. In 1975 White and a number of other politically active UT Austin professors "sued the university and President Lorene Rogers, alleging they were denied full salary increases for which they had been recommended in 1975 in retaliation for their political activities", according to White's then-attorney, David Richards, husband of future Texas governor Ann Richards.

Although a Texas district court initially ruled in favor of the university, White's appeal that he had been discriminated against, in regards to First Amendment faculty rights, was approved by the US 5th Circuit Court in 1981:

The plaintiffs alleged that this salary action was taken in retaliation against their exercise of their first amendment right to freedom of speech and association. After a bench trial, the district court ruled that the plaintiffs were not entitled to the requested injunctive, declaratory, and monetary relief. Contending that the district court's finding that the plaintiffs had failed to prove retaliatory intent was clearly erroneous, three of the plaintiffs, Professors White, Gavenda, and Shepley, now bring this appeal. We find that the district court's decision was clearly erroneous only with respect to plaintiff-appellant White.

== Nationality in world history ==
The common ground between White's scholarship on early America and his civic political activism was more fully elaborated with his founding of an upper-division course at the University of Texas in the early 1970s called "Nationality in World History." The course examined the global history of how different sovereign nations came into being throughout history. White taught this course for nearly thirty years. After withdrawing from Austin politics in the 1970s, and from university politics in the 1980s, White concentrated primarily on this course and its scholarship for the last two decades of his life. In the words of colleague Michael Hall:

"Phil devoted his last years to investigating the roots of nationalism." This research took him back into the evolution of group instincts in Homo sapiens and the burgeoning field of sociobiology. Phil plunged in relentlessly and took no easy escapes from the rigours of exacting scholarship".

Unlike most scholars of nationalism, White chose not to view the topic through ethnic-tinted lenses, but preferred an anthropological, long-term view of the subject: the overall history of the phenomenon of group formation (and maintenance) in our species.

Upon retiring, White founded and organized the "World 2000: Teaching World History & World Geography" conference, in conjunction with the World History Association. Keynote speakers included personal friend and former colleague William Hardy McNeill, fellow Columbia alumnus Immanuel Wallerstein, and slave-trade historian Philip D. Curtin.

In his final decade, White often collaborated with the renowned British global historian A.G. Hopkins. White's chapter in Hopkins' edited book [Global History: Interactions Between the Universal and the Local] pointed out that, in the words of one reviewer from London, "ethnicity has never been foundational for the development of viable states". The chapter generated high marks from others as well. Hopkins recalls when one of his former colleagues at the University of Cambridge told him that White's essay "was read by former British Prime Minister Tony Blair to prepare for a visit to Africa to address the continent's problems".

== See also ==
- Civic virtue
- Colonial history of the United States
- Student Strike of 1970
