= Stephen H. Spurr =

American academic (1918–1990)

20th President of the University of Texas at Austin
- In office 1971–1974
- Preceded by: Bryce Jordan
- Succeeded by: Lorene Rogers

Personal details
- Born: February 14, 1918 Washington, D.C., U.S.
- Died: June 20, 1990 (aged 72) Austin, Texas, U.S.
- Occupation: Professor

Stephen Hopkins Spurr (February 14, 1918 – June 20, 1990) was an American professor and ecologist. He served as the 20th president of the University of Texas at Austin from 1971 to 1974.

Spurr was born in Washington, D.C., and earned his bachelor's degree in botany from the University of Florida in 1938. He then attended Yale University, where he earned his master's degree in forestry in 1940, followed by his doctorate in 1950. He became a professor at the University of Michigan in 1952 and was named the dean of the School of Natural Resources there in 1962. From 1964 to 1971, he was the dean of Michigan's Rackham Graduate School. He was also the founding editor of the journal Forest Science and a co-founder of the Organization for Tropical Studies.

Spurr moved to the University of Texas at Austin in 1971 to become its president. However, his time as president was described as "stormy" due to disputes with chancellor Charles LeMaistre and the Board of Regents, and he was ultimately dismissed by the regents in September 1974. He remained at the University of Texas as a professor of botany and public affairs until retiring in 1983, and he received the Gifford Pinchot Medal from the Society of American Foresters in 1985. He died in Austin, Texas, in 1990 from a heart attack.
