= Peter T. Flawn =

American geologist

Peter T. Flawn (February 17, 1926 – May 7, 2017) was President of the University of Texas at Austin from 1979 to 1985. He was also a geologist and educator.

== Early life ==
Flawn was born in Miami, Florida. He earned his bachelor's degree from Oberlin College in 1947 and his PhD in geology from Yale University in 1951 and was prominent as a geologist, educator, author, and consultant. He served in the U.S. Army Air Corps during World War II.

Flawn served as Professor of Geological Sciences and Director of the Bureau of Economic Geology at the University of Texas at Austin from 1960 to 1970. He became Professor of Geological Sciences and Public Affairs in 1970 and Leonidas T. Barrow Professor of Mineral Resources in 1978. From 1970 to 1972 he served as Vice President for Academic Affairs. He was appointed Executive Vice President of the University of Texas at Austin in 1972. In 1973, he was named President of the University of Texas at San Antonio.

He became President of the University of Texas at Austin in 1979. As president he declared a "war on mediocrity". Under his administration UT Austin created a new core curriculum and higher admission standards. At one point under his administration it was claimed by the university they had a larger number of National Merit Scholars than any other university. He also headed the university as it celebrated its centennial in 1983. He stepped down as president in 1985.

Flawn served as President ad interim of the University of Texas at Austin from July 1997 to April 1998.

== Honors ==
Flawn was elected to the National Academy of Engineering in 1974. He was awarded the Condecoracion de la Orden del Sol del Peru in 1984. In 1985, he received the Wilbur Lucius Cross Medal from Yale University. The American Institute of Professional Geologists awarded him the Ben H. Parker Memorial Medal in 1989.

He was President of the Geological Society of America in 1978 and President of the American Geological Institute in 1988. The American Association of Petroleum Geologists elected him an Honorary Member in 1983. The American Geological Institute awarded him the Ian Campbell Medal in 1993. Oberlin College awarded him an Honorary Doctorate of Science in 1995. Flawn served on the National Science Board from 1980–86.

In 1987–88 he was Chairman of the Texas National Laboratory Commission. He was reappointed to the Texas National Research Laboratory Commission in 1991. He was awarded the Distinguished Service Award by the Ex-Students Association of the University of Texas at Austin in 1998. He served as Chairman of the Board of Directors of Southwest Research Institute from 1997–99.

The Board of Regents of the University of Texas System presented him with the Santa Rita Award in October 2000. He received a Presidential Citation from The University of Texas at Austin in September 2000 and the Mirabeau B. Lamar Medal presented by the Association of Texas Colleges and Universities in October 2001.

He served as Director of Hester Capital Management, LLC and as a member of the board of Managers of Signature Science.

== Family ==
Flawn was born in Miami, Florida. He and his wife, Priscilla (née Pond) Flawn had two children, Tyrrell Flawn and the late Dr. Laura Flawn (now deceased).

Academic offices
| Preceded by Arleigh B. Templeton | President of University of Texas at San Antonio; 1973–1978 | Succeeded by James W. Wagener |
| Preceded by Lorene Lane Rogers | President of University of Texas at Austin; 1979–1985 | Succeeded by William H. Cunningham |
| Preceded by Robert M. Berdahl | President of University of Texas at Austin; 1997–1998 | Succeeded by Larry R. Faulkner |
