= Robert M. Berdahl =

Retired American college and university administrator

Interim President of the University of Oregon
- In office 2011–2012
- Preceded by: Richard W. Lariviere
- Succeeded by: Michael R. Gottfredson

5th President of the Association of American Universities
- In office 2006–2011
- Preceded by: Nils Hasselmo
- Succeeded by: Hunter R. Rawlings III

8th Chancellor of the University of California, Berkeley
- In office 1997–2004
- Preceded by: Chang-Lin Tien
- Succeeded by: Robert J. Birgeneau

25th President of the University of Texas at Austin
- In office 1993–1997
- Preceded by: William S. Livingston
- Succeeded by: Peter Tyrrell Flawn

Personal details
- Born: March 15, 1937 (age 89) Sioux Falls, South Dakota, U.S.
- Education: Augustana College; University of Illinois; University of Minnesota
- Profession: Administrator

Robert Max Berdahl (born March 15, 1937) is a retired American college and university administrator.

== Biography ==
Born in Sioux Falls, South Dakota, Berdahl received a Bachelor of Arts from Augustana College in 1959. Additionally, he obtained a Master of Arts from the University of Illinois at Urbana–Champaign in 1961. He would later follow Otto Pflanze to the University of Minnesota where he received his doctorate in 1965, with a dissertation on the Prussian Conservative Party during German unification circa 1870.

Berdahl was an assistant professor of history at the University of Massachusetts from 1965 to 1967. From 1967 to 1986, Berdahl was a history professor at the University of Oregon. In addition to his duties as professor, he served as dean of the university's College of Arts and Sciences from 1981 to 1986. Later on, Berdahl would go on to serve as vice chancellor for academic affairs at the University of Illinois at Urbana-Champaign, from 1986 to 1993.

He was president of University of Texas at Austin from 1993 to 1997 and later chancellor of the University of California, Berkeley from 1997 to 2004. He served as president of the Association of American Universities from May 2006 to June 2011. In addition, he currently serves on the Board of Directors of Lam Research Corporation.

In December 2011, the Oregon State Board of Higher Education asked Berdahl to serve as the president of the University of Oregon on an interim basis. The presidency of the University of Oregon had recently been vacated by Richard Lariviere following his early termination by the state board. Three months into Berdahl's presidency the faculty voted to form a union affiliated with the American Federation of Teachers and American Association of University Professors, and a month later Berdahl agreed to end efforts to prevent certification by the Oregon Employment Relations Board. Michael R. Gottfredson succeeded Berdahl effective August 1, 2012.

== Works ==
- "New Thoughts on German Nationalism," The American Historical Review Vol. 77, No. 1, February 1972
- "Conservative Politics and Aristocratic Landholders in Bismarckian Germany," The Journal of Modern History Vol. 44, No. 1, March 1972
- "The Stände and the Origins of Conservatism in Prussia," Eighteenth-Century Studies Vol. 6, No. 3, Spring 1973
- The Politics of the Prussian Nobility: The Development of a Conservative Ideology, 1770-1848 (Princeton University Press, January 1989)

Academic offices
| Preceded by William S. Livingston | President of the University of Texas at Austin; 1993-1997 | Succeeded by Peter Tyrrell Flawn |
| Preceded by Chang-Lin Tien | Chancellor of the University of California, Berkeley; 1997-2004 | Succeeded by Robert J. Birgeneau |
| Preceded by Nils Hasselmo | President of the Association of American Universities; 2006-2011 | Succeeded by Hunter R. Rawlings III |
| Preceded by Richard W. Lariviere | President of the University of Oregon; Interim; 2011-2012 | Succeeded by Michael R. Gottfredson |
