= Leslie Waggener =

American academic (1841–1896)

1st President of the University of Texas at Austin
- In office 1895–1896
- Succeeded by: George T. Winston

President of Bethel College
- In office c. 1875–1877 – 1883
- Preceded by: Noah K. Davis
- Succeeded by: James H. Fuqua (chairman of the faculty)

Personal details
- Born: September 11, 1841 Trenton, Kentucky, U.S.
- Died: August 19, 1896 (aged 54) Manitou Springs, Colorado, U.S.
- Spouse: Fannie Pendleton (m. 1867)
- Children: 7
- Education: Bethel College (B.A., M.A.); Harvard University (B.A.); Georgetown College (LL.D.)
- Occupation: Professor

Leslie Waggener Sr. (September 11, 1841 – August 19, 1896) was an American professor who served as the first president of the University of Texas at Austin. He also served as president of Bethel College in Kentucky.

== Life and career ==
Waggener was born in Trenton, Kentucky, and earned degrees from Bethel College in 1860 and Harvard University in 1861. During the American Civil War, he fought in the Confederate Army. He then became a professor of English at Bethel and became chairman of the faculty in 1873. Sometime between 1875 and 1877, he became the college's president, a position he held until 1883. He earned a master's degree from Bethel in 1867 and a doctorate from Georgetown College in 1875.

He joined the University of Texas in 1883 as an English literature and history professor in its inaugural faculty. From 1884 to 1894, he was elected as chairman of the faculty. Waggener became the university's first president in 1895 upon the creation of the office, serving in an interim role for one year. He was also the president of the Texas State Teachers Association for one year.

== Family ==
Waggener married Fannie Pendleton in 1867; the couple had seven children. He was a deacon in the Baptist Church.

== Death ==
He died in Manitou Springs, Colorado, and was buried in Austin, Texas. Waggener Hall at the University of Texas at Austin is named after him.
