= Jonathan Overpeck =

American climate scientist (born 1957)

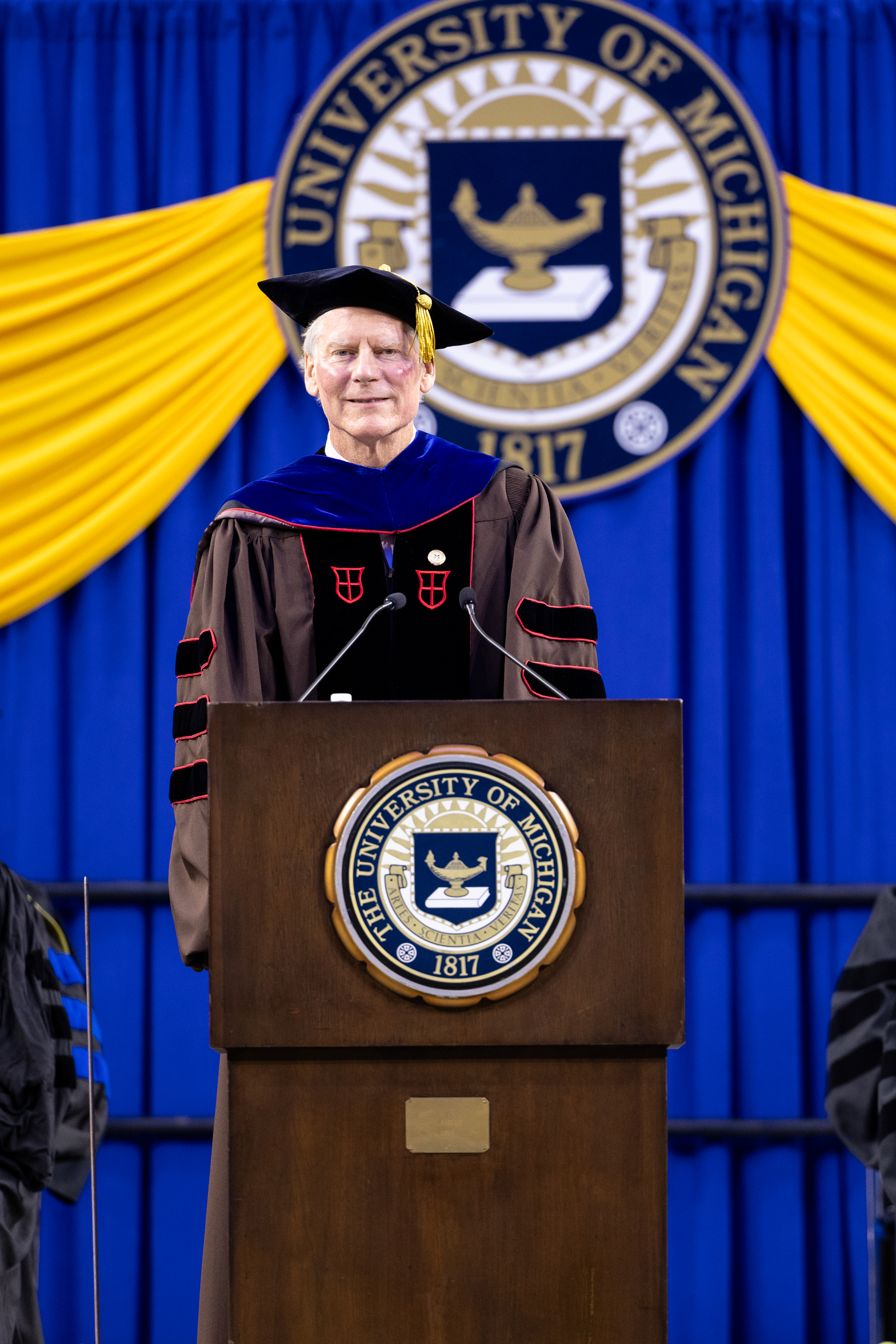
- Overpeck speaking at the Spring 2024 SEAS commencement ceremony
- Born: 1957 (age 68–69)

Academic background
- Education: Hamilton College; Brown University
- Thesis: Time series analysis of Holocene pollen data: paleoclimatological and paleoecological applications
- Doctoral advisor: Thompson Webb

Jonathan Taylor Overpeck (born 1957) is an American climate scientist. Since 2017, he has served as the Samuel A. Graham Dean of the University of Michigan School for Environment and Sustainability. Overpeck has authored more than 220 scientific publications. In 2007, he was a coordinating lead author on a report for the Intergovernmental Panel on Climate Change, which was awarded a Nobel Peace Prize.

== Early life and education ==
Overpeck obtained an undergraduate degree in geology from Hamilton College in Clinton, New York. He has an MSc and PhD in Geological Sciences (1981 and 1985) from Brown University in Rhode Island and then became a Post-doctoral Research Scientist at Columbia University jointly with the NASA Goddard Institute for Space Studies.

== Career ==
Prior to joining the University of Michigan, Overpeck was faculty at the University of Arizona, where he was the director of Institute for the Study of Planet Earth. He became the Samuel A. Graham Dean of the University of Michigan's School for Environment and Sustainability in 2017. He has been active in university, city and state efforts to mitigate climate change. In 2015, Overpeck was elected fellow of the American Geophysical Union.

== Selected publication ==
- Jansen, E., J. Overpeck, K.R. Briffa, J.-C. Duplessy, F. Joos, V. Masson-Delmotte, D. Olago, B. Otto-Bliesner, W.R. Peltier, S. Rahmstorf, R. Ramesh, D. Raynaud, D. Rind, O. Solomina, R. Villalba and D. Zhang (2007). "Paleoclimate." Climate Change 2007: The Physical Science Basis. Contribution of Working Group I to the Fourth Assessment Report of the Intergovernmental Panel on Climate Change [Solomon, S., D. Qin, M. Manning, Z. Chen, M. Marquis, K.B. Averyt, M. Tignor and H.L. Miller (eds.)]. Cambridge University Press, Cambridge, United Kingdom and New York, NY, USA.
