= University of Texas at Austin Graduate School =

Graduate School at The University of Texas at Austin

The Graduate School at The University of Texas at Austin was established in 1910. The school offers advanced degrees in nearly 100 fields of study and has more than 12,000 students. According to the school's website, "[The Graduate School] awards the second highest number of doctoral degrees in the United States." Additionally, a number of the school's programs rank among the highest in the nation. Below is a table indicating rankings awarded to various programs in The Graduate School from 2005 to 2008:
