= John William Calhoun =

11th president of the University of Texas at Austin

John William Calhoun (October 24, 1871 Manchester, Tennessee - July 7, 1947 Austin, Texas) was the 11th president of the University of Texas at Austin between 1937 and 1939. Calhoun Hall, a building constructed in 1968 and located on the University of Texas campus, is named after him.

He graduated from University of Texas at Austin and Harvard University.

== See also ==
- History of The University of Texas at Austin
- List of University of Texas at Austin presidents
