= Waggener Hall =

Coordinates: 30.2851°N 97.7376°W

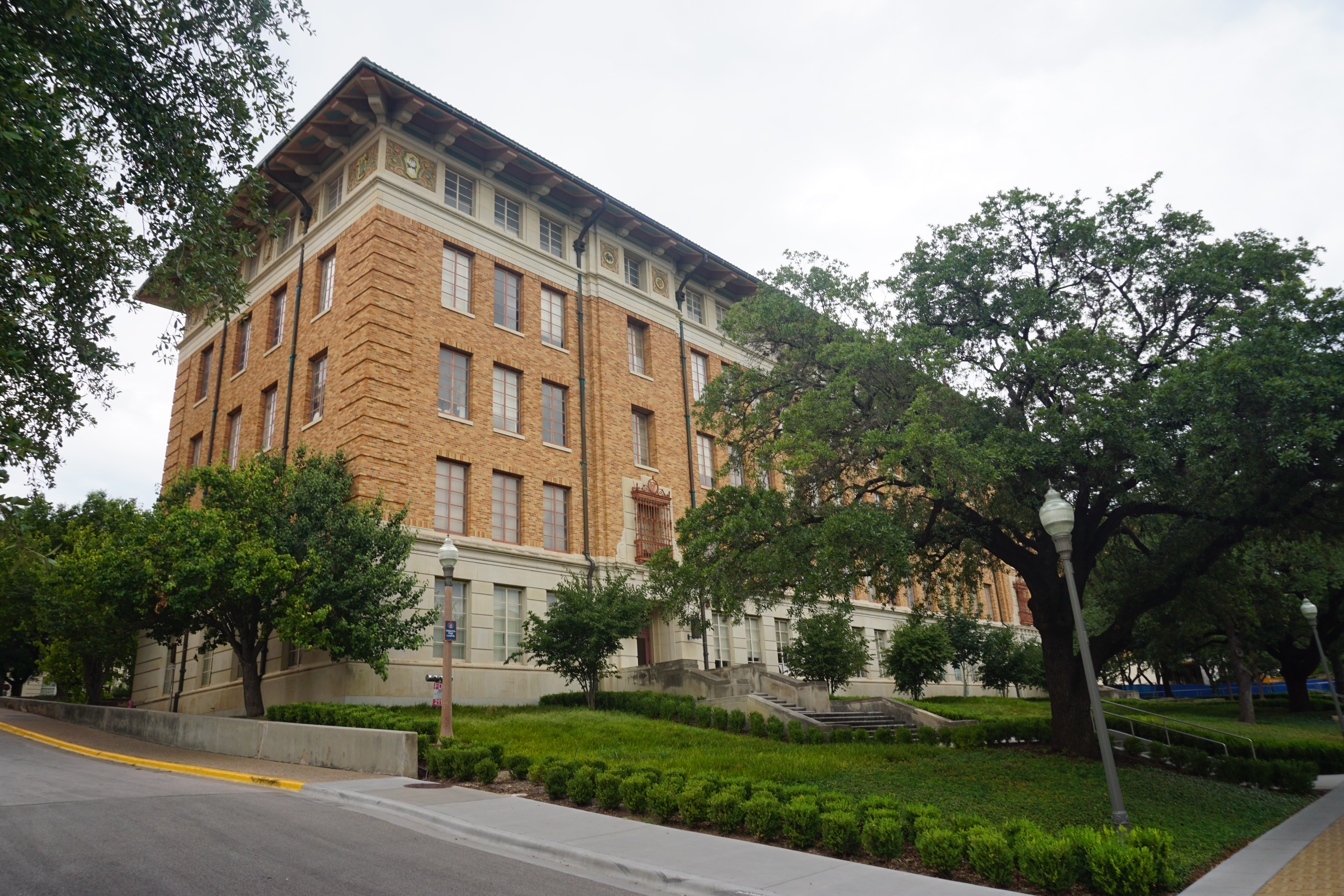
- The building's exterior in 2019
- Interactive map of the Waggener Hall area
- Alternative names: WAG

General information
- Architectural style: Mediterranean Renaissance
- Location: 2210 Speedway, Austin, Texas, United States
- Current tenants: College of Liberal Arts
- Named for: Leslie Waggener
- Completed: 1931
- Cost: US$350,000
- Owner: University of Texas at Austin

Technical details
- Floor count: 6
- Floor area: 57,538 sq ft (5,345.5 m^{2})

Design and construction
- Architect: Herbert M. Greene

Waggener Hall is an academic building located on the University of Texas at Austin campus. This building houses the Classics Library on the first floor. The Classics and Philosophy Departments are based in Waggener Hall, as well as the Jefferson Scholars Program.

It is named for Leslie Waggener, the first president of the university.
