= Jackson Geological Sciences Building =

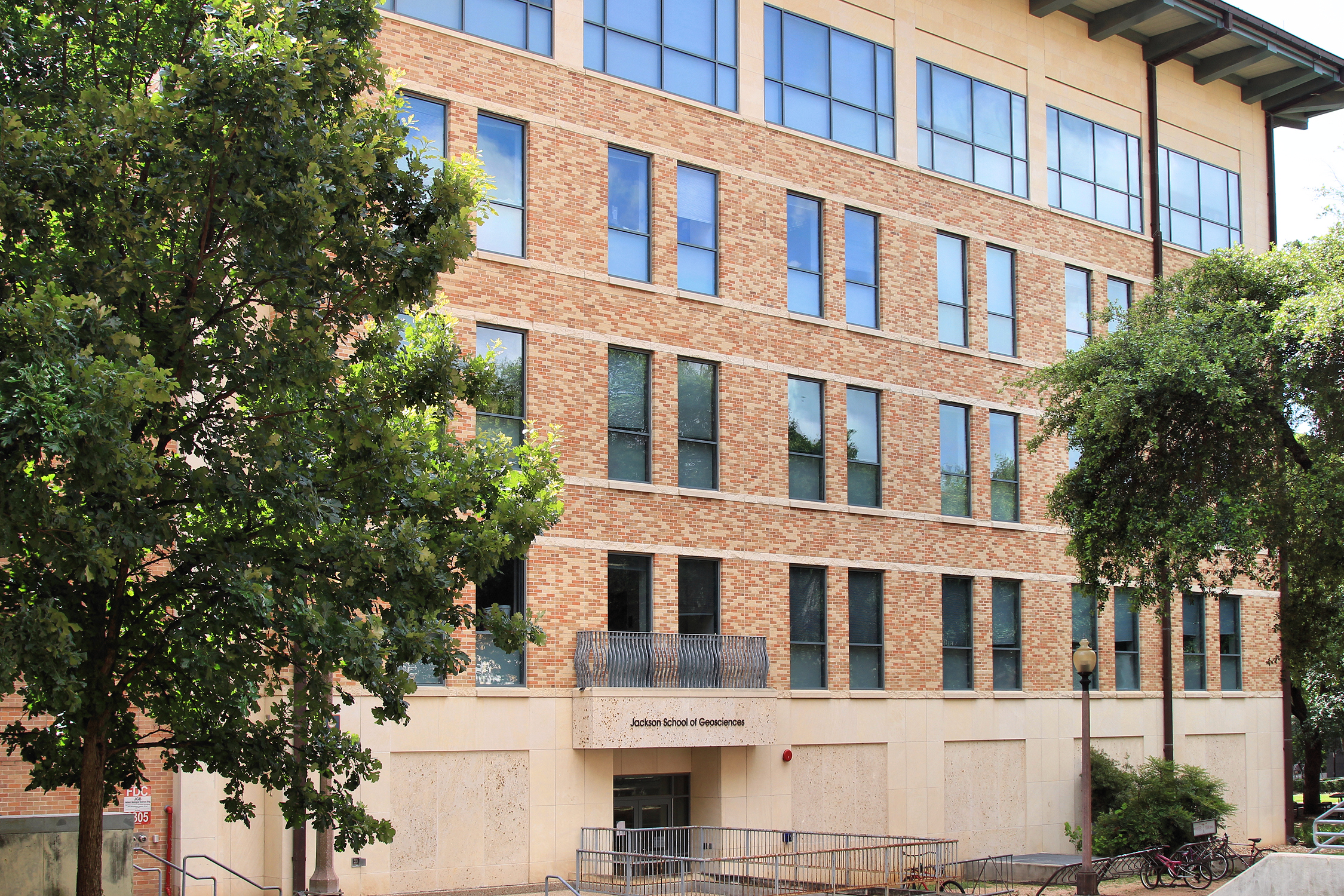
- The west entrance to the Jackson Geological Sciences Building, 2019
- Interactive map of the Jackson Geological Sciences Building area

General information
- Location: Austin, Texas, United States
- Coordinates: 30.2858°N 97.7358°W

Jackson Geological Sciences Building (JGB) is a building on the University of Texas at Austin campus, in the U.S. state of Texas. The building was completed in 1967.
