= Harry Ransom (academic administrator) =

American public official

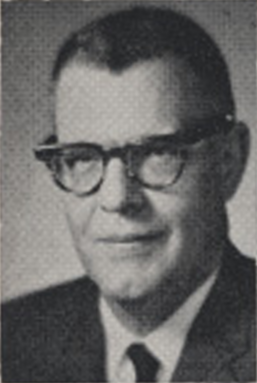
Ransom, c. 1964

Harry Huntt Ransom (November 22, 1908 – April 19, 1976) was a faculty member and administrator at the University of Texas, becoming the university's president in 1960, and ultimately served as the chancellor of the University of Texas System from 1961 to 1971.

Ransom was instrumental in founding the Humanities Research Center at the University of Texas at Austin (which became the Harry Ransom Center in 1983). In 1978, at a cost of $2.4 million, the center acquired a complete copy of the Gutenberg Bible.

Ransom served on the National Commission for Libraries appointed by President Lyndon B. Johnson.

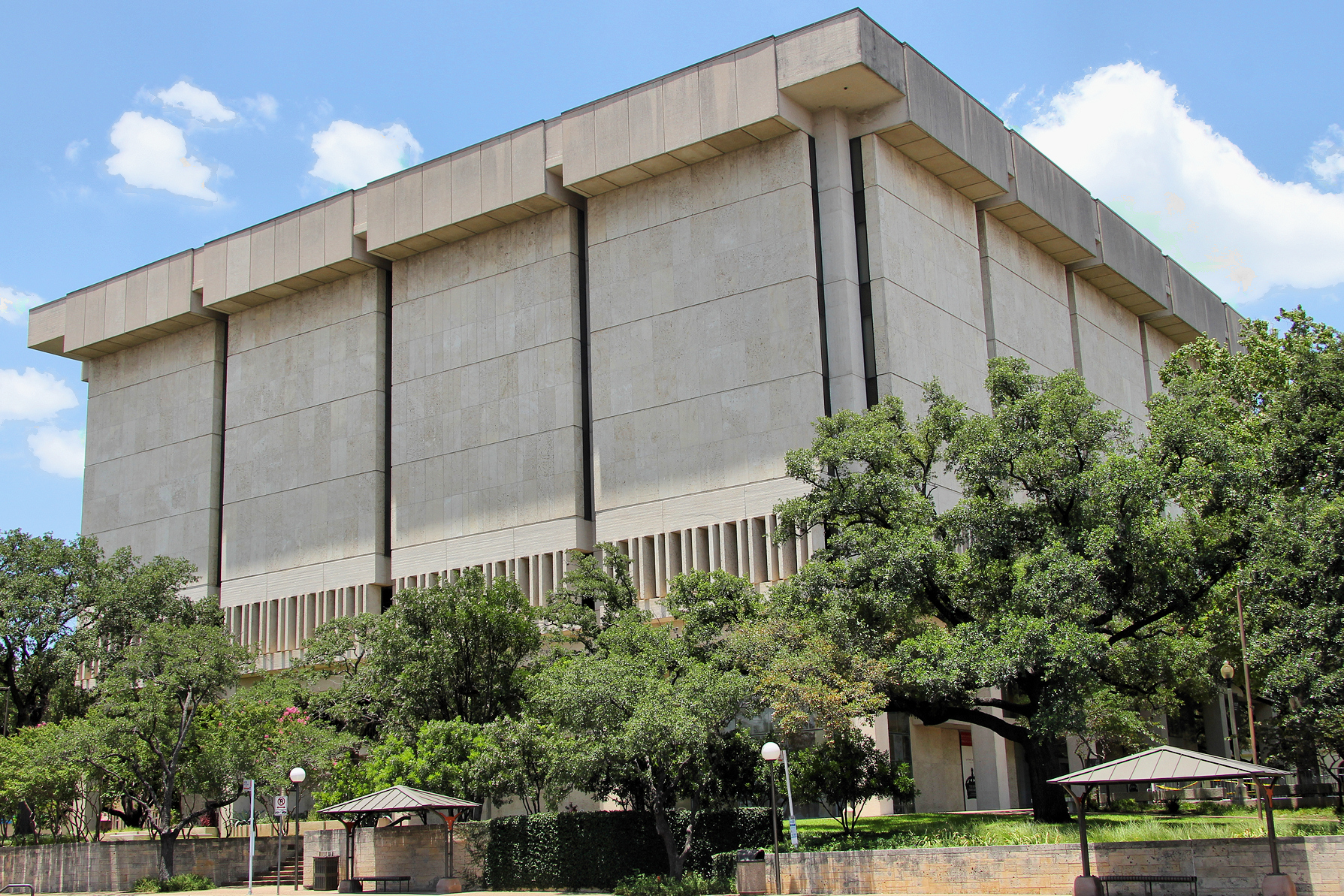
The Harry Ransom Center, on the University of Texas at Austin campus, Austin, Texas, United States.

Ransom was the only son of Harry Huntt and Marion Goodwin (Cunningham) Ransom. He was married in Galveston on August 11, 1951, to Hazel Louise Harrod. The couple had no children.
