= Calhoun Hall =

Building on the University of Texas at Austin campus

Coordinates: 30.2845°N 97.7402°W

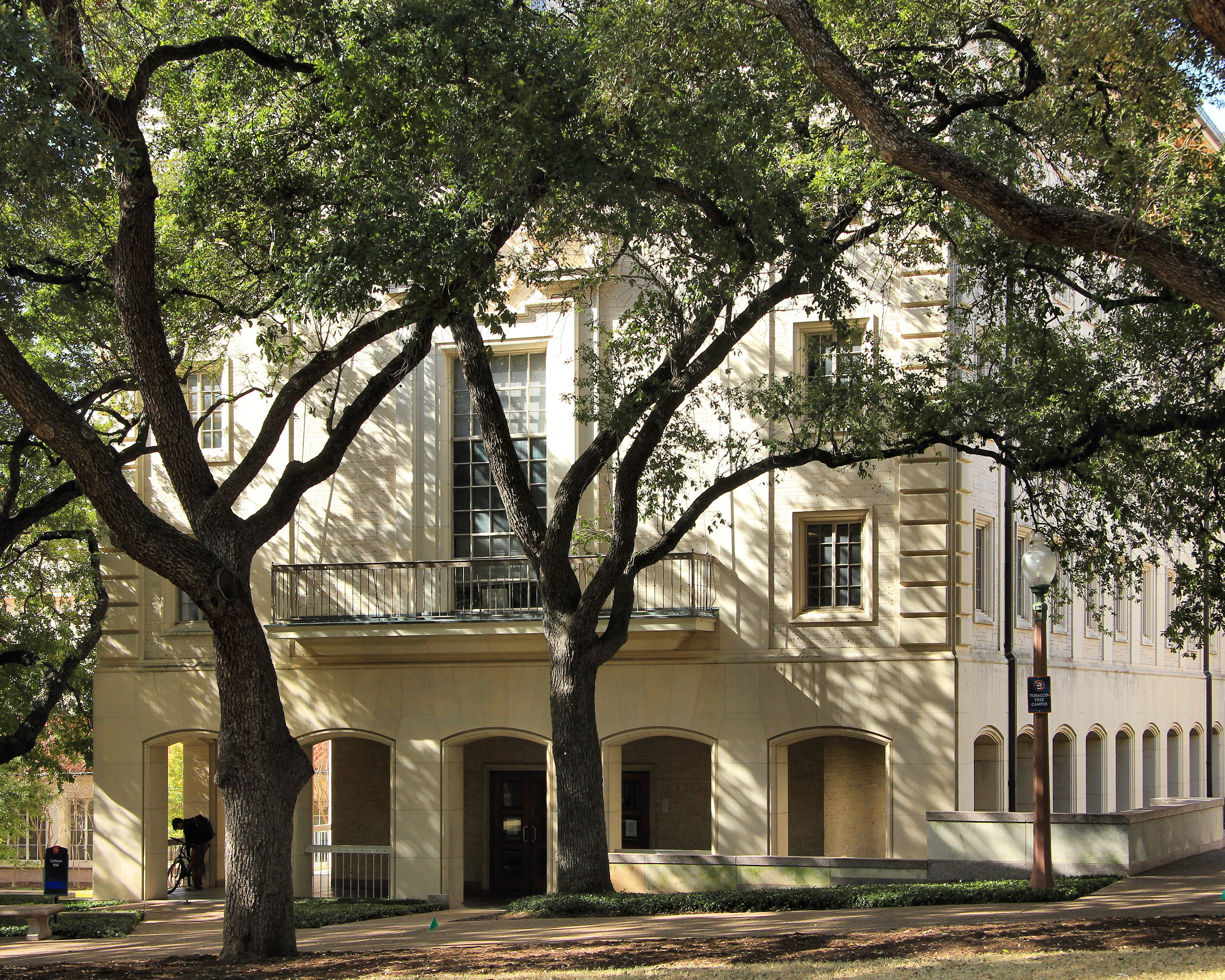
- Interactive map of the Calhoun Hall area
- Alternative names: CAL

General information
- Location: 204 West 21st Street, Austin, Texas, United States
- Named for: John William Calhoun
- Completed: 1968
- Owner: University of Texas at Austin

Technical details
- Floor count: 7
- Floor area: 55,077 sq ft (5,116.8 m^{2})

Calhoun Hall (abbreviated CAL) is a building located on the University of Texas at Austin campus, built in 1968. The building is named after John William Calhoun, a mathematics professor, university comptroller from 1925 to 1937, and university president from 1937 to 1939.
