= Francisco G. Cigarroa =

American physician and public official

Francisco Cigarroa
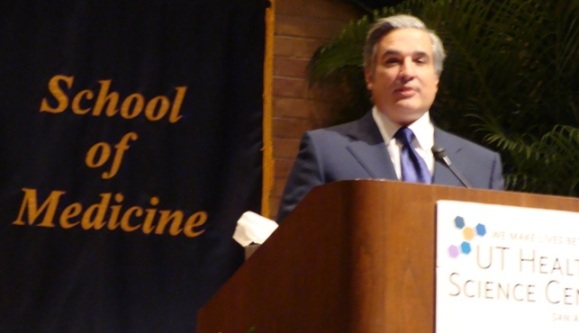

10th Chancellor of the University of Texas System
- In office February 2, 2009 – January 4, 2015
- Preceded by: Mark Yudof
- Succeeded by: William H. McRaven

Personal details
- Born: December 7, 1957 (age 68) Laredo, Texas, U.S.
- Education: Yale University (BS); University of Texas, Southwestern (MD)
- Occupation: Chairman of Ford Foundation

Francisco Gonzalez Cigarroa (born December 7, 1957) is an American physician and public official who served as chancellor of the University of Texas System. Cigarroa served as the first Hispanic to serve as president of the University of Texas Health Science Center at San Antonio (UTHSCSA). Cigarroa additionally served as the chairman of the Ford Foundation and head of pediatric transplant surgery at UTHSCSA.

== Early life and education ==
Born in the border city of Laredo in south Texas, Cigarroa graduated from J. W. Nixon High School. In 1979, he earned a bachelor's degree from Yale University in New Haven, Connecticut. He received his medical degree from the University of Texas Southwestern Medical Center at Dallas in 1983. He was elected to Alpha Omega Alpha, a national honor society for medical students, residents, scientists, and physicians in the United States and Canada.

== Career ==
During his twelve years of postgraduate training, Cigarroa was chief resident at Massachusetts General Hospital – the teaching hospital of Harvard Medical School in Boston, Massachusetts – and completed pediatric surgery and transplant surgery fellowships at Johns Hopkins Hospital in Baltimore, Maryland.

In January 2009, Cigarroa was appointed chancellor of the University of Texas System. He is the first Hispanic to ever lead a major university system in the United States. Before this appointment he had been the first Hispanic president of the University of Texas Health Science Center at San Antonio.

On July 1, 2010, Cigarroa began serving an elected six-year term as an Alumni Fellow to the Yale Corporation, the governing body of Yale University.

In August 2011, Cigarroa presented to the University Board of Regents his Framework for Advancing Excellence designed to make the University of Texas System one of the top-ranked US educational systems of higher learning. The framework was unanimously approved by the Board of Regents and has since received national acclaim. In December 2011, Cigarroa was invited to the White House to share his program with US President Barack Obama and US Secretary of Education Arne Duncan.

On February 10, 2014, Cigarroa announced his resignation from the UT System. His office forwarded third party letters of recommendations to the president's office at UT Austin, but he was not involved in overturning decisions made by the admissions committee. He played a leadership role in uncovering admission wrongdoings at UT Austin by commissioning the Kroll Report. He currently works as Director of Transplantation Services at the University of Texas Health Science Center San Antonio.
