= Forgivable loan =

A forgivable loan, also called a soft second, is a form of loan in which part or all of the loan will not have to be repaid if certain conditions are met. It is more like a grant with conditions rather than a loan, because in most cases the loan is forgiven if all the conditions are met. However, if the conditions are not met the loan has to be repaid, usually with interest. It can be seen as an incentive for the borrower to perform or achieve a goal set by the lender.

Forgivable loans are sometimes used in the financial services industry to lure a financial advisor from one firm to another. For example, an advisor may be offered an incentive, structured as a four-year loan, if he moves his book of business to the firm. The loan is made up of four equal annual payments, each of which is forgiven as they become due if the advisor continues to work for the firm.

== See also ==
- Golden handcuffs
- Golden handshake
