= Harry Yandell Benedict =

American astronomer and mathematician

Harry Yandell Benedict (November 14, 1869 – May 10, 1937) was an American academic administrator, astronomer, and mathematician. He was president of the University of Texas at Austin.

== Early life ==
Benedict was born in Louisville, Kentucky, to Joseph and Adele (Peters) Benedict on November 14, 1869. In 1877, His brother, Carl, mother, and maternal grandfather, H. J. Peters, moved to Texas, onto land acquired by his great-grandfather, S. W. Peters. The family library contained one thousand books. Other than eight months of formal schooling in the cities of Graham and Weatherford, H. Y. Benedict was homeschooled by his mother. Benedict studied civil engineering at the University of Texas at Austin from 1889 to 1892, and completed a master's degree in 1893. He then worked at the McCormick Observatory at the University of Virginia until 1895, when he began working toward a doctorate in mathematical astronomy at Harvard University.

== Career ==
Upon completion of his studies in 1898, Benedict served as interim instructor of mathematics and astronomy at Vanderbilt University in 1899. Later that year, he began teaching mathematics at the University of Texas at Austin. In 1907, Benedict was named professor of applied mathematics and astronomy. He served as director of extension between 1909 and 1911, when he became dean of the College of Arts and Sciences. Benedict yielded the deanship in 1927 to succeed Walter Marshall William Splawn as university president. Benedict remained president until his death in 1937. He was the first alumnus of the university to serve as its president and the institution's longest-serving leader, as well as the first president to have headed the school's alumni association.

Over the course of his career, Benedict was elected a fellow of the American Association for the Advancement of Science, and as a member of the American Mathematical Society, the American Astronomical Society, the American Statistical Association, among other academic organizations.

== Personal life ==
Benedict died from a cerebral hemorrhage on May 10, 1937.
