= School for Environment and Sustainability =

School of the University of Michigan

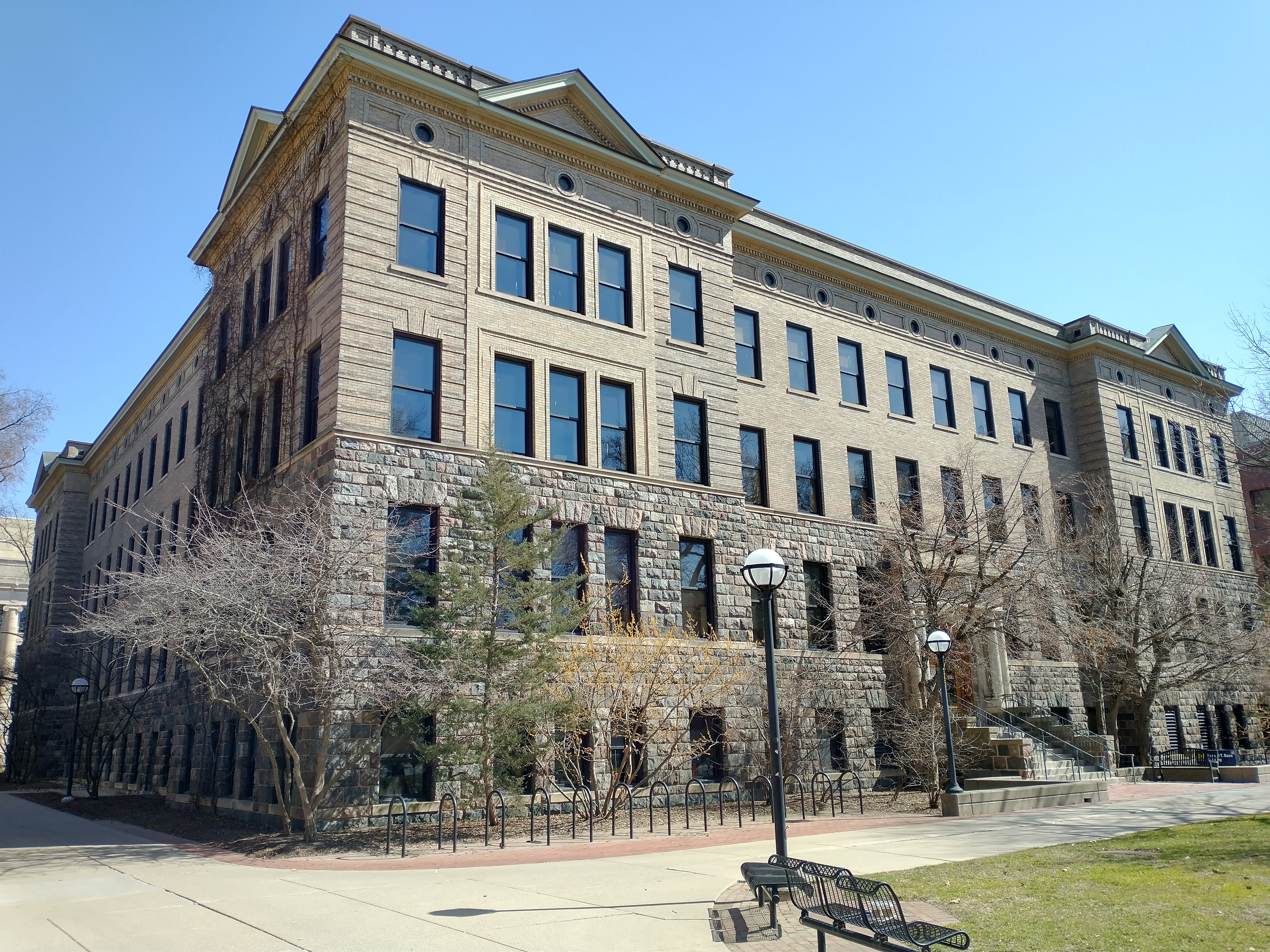
- Established: 1927; 99 years ago
- Parent institution: University of Michigan
- Dean: Jonathan Overpeck
- Faculty: 78
- Students: 980 (FA 2024)
- Location: Ann Arbor, MI, USA
- Nickname: SEAS
- Website: seas.umich.edu
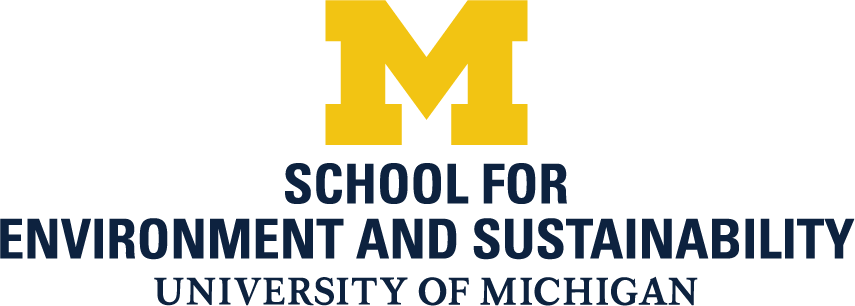

The School for Environment and Sustainability (SEAS) is the school of environmental science and sustainability studies at the University of Michigan, a public research university in Ann Arbor, Michigan.

== History ==
The School for Environment and Sustainability was founded as the School of Forestry in 1927 in the Kraus Building, it is now housed in the S.T. Dana Building. SEAS provides graduate-level degrees at the doctorate and master's levels. Prior to 2004, the School of Natural Resources and Environment offered undergraduate degrees in Environmental Science and Environmental Policy, before restructuring as a graduate-level degree program.

The school houses several research centers, works with experts in other fields at the University of Michigan, and works towards the goals of protecting the earth's resources and pursuing the achievement of a sustainable society.

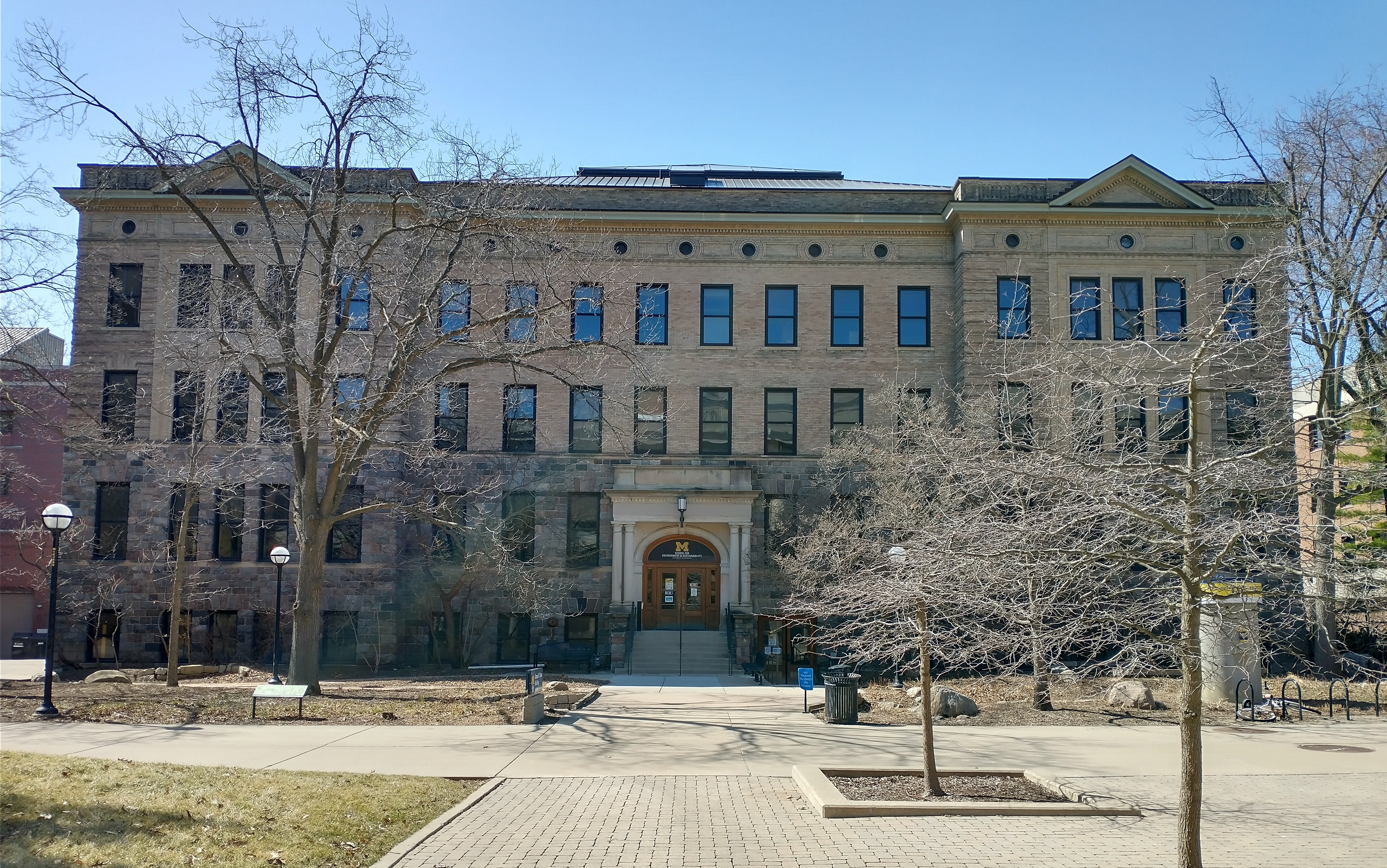
Opposite face of the Dana Building

== Degree programs ==
The school offers two master's degrees: an M.S. (Master of Science) in Natural Resources and Environment and an M.L.A. (Master of Landscape Architecture) in Landscape Architecture.

Students in the M.S. program specialize in one of seven fields of study:

- Behavior, Education and Communication
- Ecosystem Science and Management - Conservation Ecology
- Geospatial Data Sciences - Environmental Informatics
- Environmental Justice
- Environmental Policy and Planning
- Sustainable Systems
- Sustainability & Development

Students pursuing an M.L.A. degree choose from two tracks:

- Three-year accredited M.L.A. degree
- Two-year program for those individuals interested in obtaining a second degree in landscape architecture at the master's level, practicing landscape architects seeking advanced education, and those interested in pursuing a doctoral degree

Two doctorate-level degrees are offered by the school.

SEAS oversees a collaborative undergraduate environmental program with the College of Literature, Science, and the Arts called the Program in the Environment.

=== Dual-degree programs ===
SEAS has five formal dual-degree programs:

- Michigan Law
- Ross School of Business
- College of Engineering
- Taubman College of Architecture and Urban Planning
- Gerald R. Ford School of Public Policy

In addition to the formal dual-degree programs, SEAS students have initiated several additional dual-degree programs, including:

- Anthropology
- Ecology and Evolutionary Biology
- Economics
- Education
- Engineering
- Public Health
- Sociology

=== Graduate certificates ===
In addition to these programs and dual-degree programs, SEAS offers the following graduate certificate programs for any graduate student concurrently enrolled at the University of Michigan:

- Sustainability
- Industrial Ecology
- Spatial Analysis
- Environmental Justice
