= Chase Headquarters Building =

Building in Waterbury, Connecticut, US

Coordinates: 41.5547°N 73.0433°W

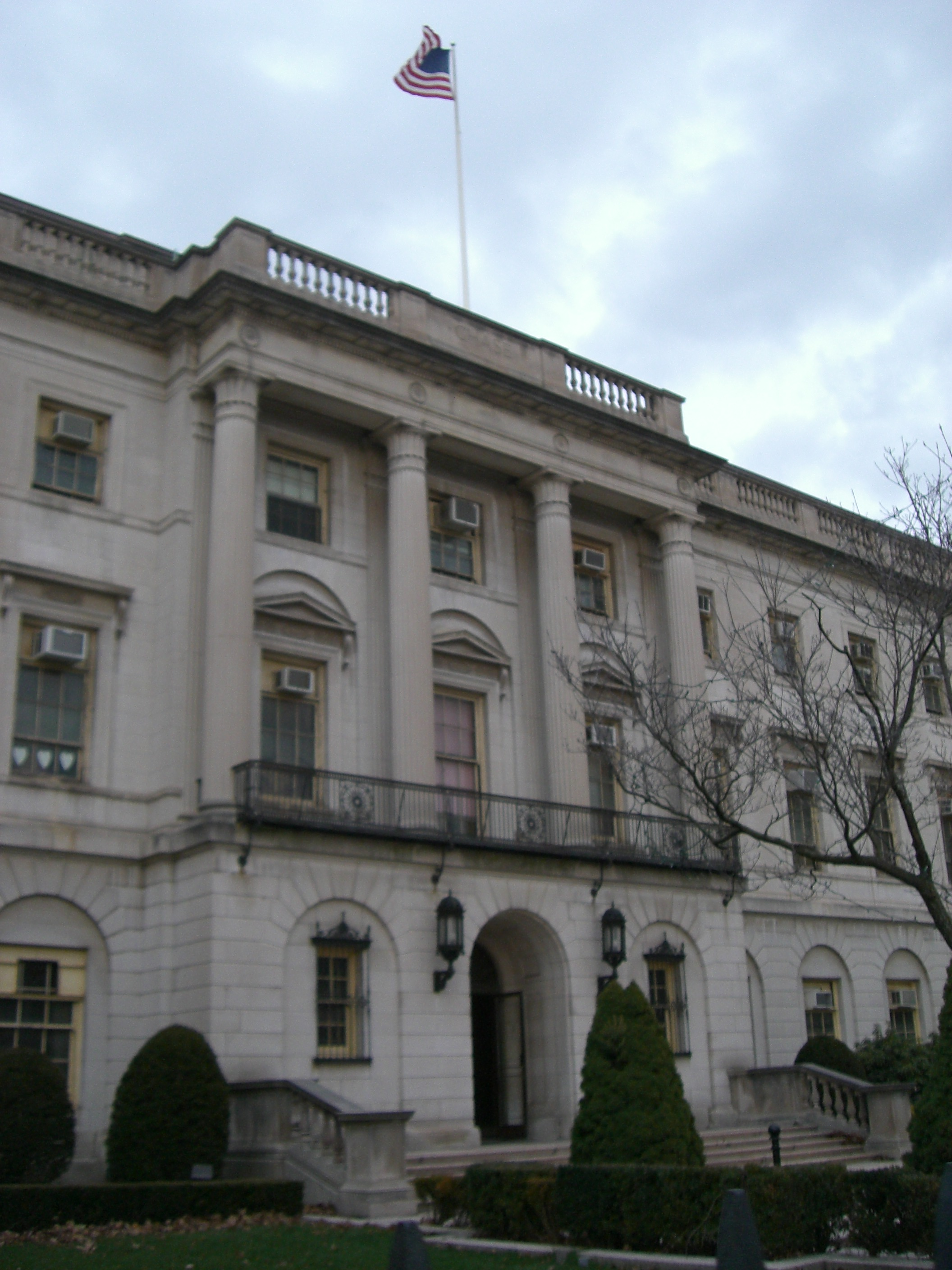
The Chase Headquarters Building

The Chase Headquarters Building is a building in Waterbury, Connecticut, on Grand Street across from the city hall. It is now occupied by the city of Waterbury's offices.

== Architecture ==
The Chase Brass and Copper Company commissioned well-known architect Cass Gilbert to design its corporate headquarters in 1916 across from his recently completed Waterbury city hall. Henry Sabin Chase, the company president, specifically requested that the headquarters be designed to contrast with the style of the city hall, resulting in a design which shunned colonial marble and brick. The Renaissance inspired building relies heavily on Adamesque designs and detailing and evokes the Tower of the Winds in the capitals on the central pavilion's columns. The excellent iron and bronze work for the building was entrusted to Philadelphian Samuel Yellin.

The building is notable for its excellent curved staircase, elaborate Adamesque plaster ceilings, careful detailing, and high quality materials. The stained-glass window in the staircase quotes Abraham Lincoln "Go forward without fear and with manly heart." Interior designer Geoffrey Webster considers the Chase Building to be one of Gilbert's finest works. Construction lasted from 1917 to 1919. The company sold its building in 1963 to preservationists for one dollar, who in turn sold it to the city of Waterbury to be used as city offices, a function it still serves today. It is now known as the Chase Municipal Building and is part of Waterbury's Cass Gilbert Historical District.

== Images ==
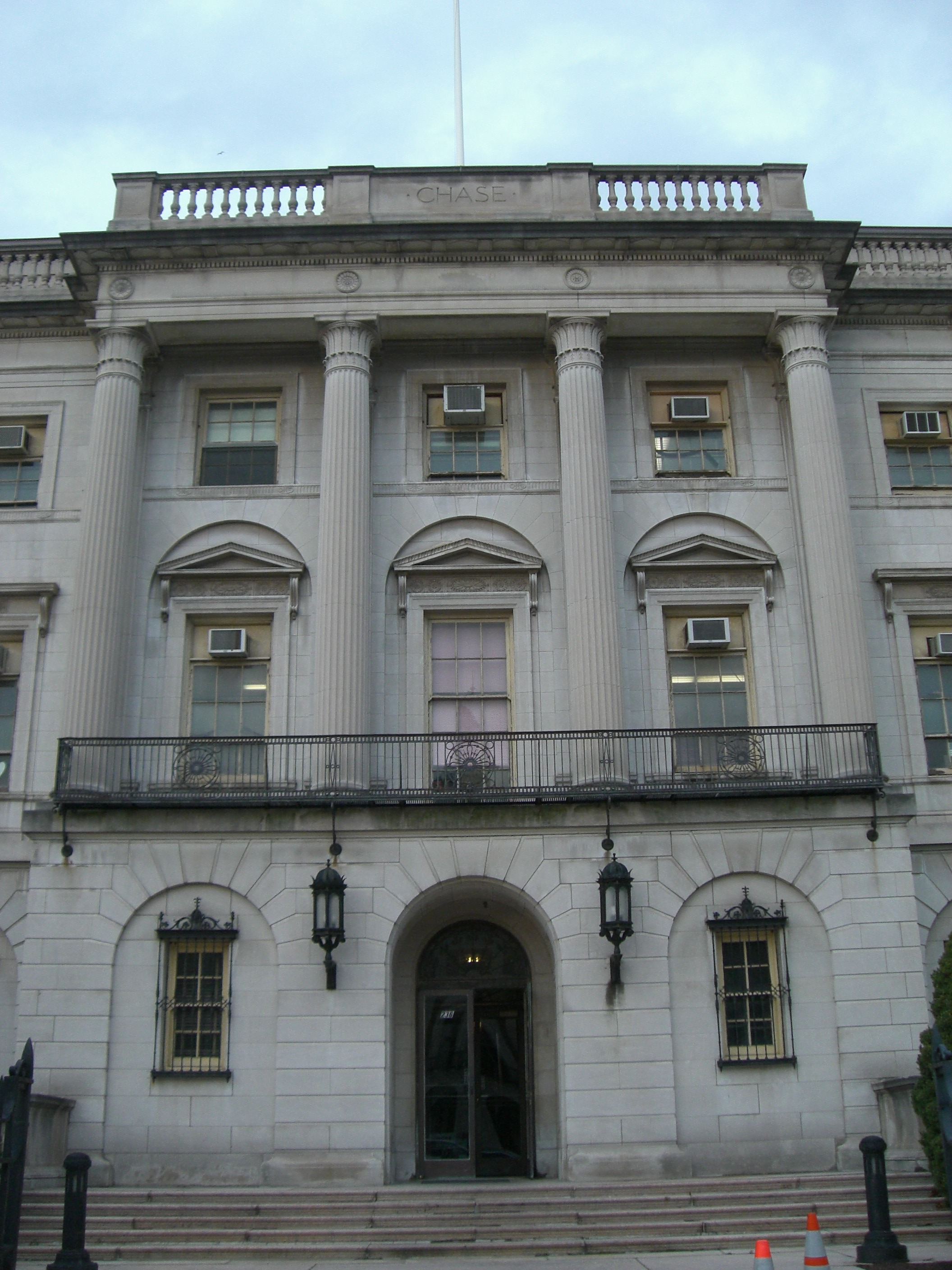
The Chase Headquarters Building showing the capitals based on those of the Tower of the Winds

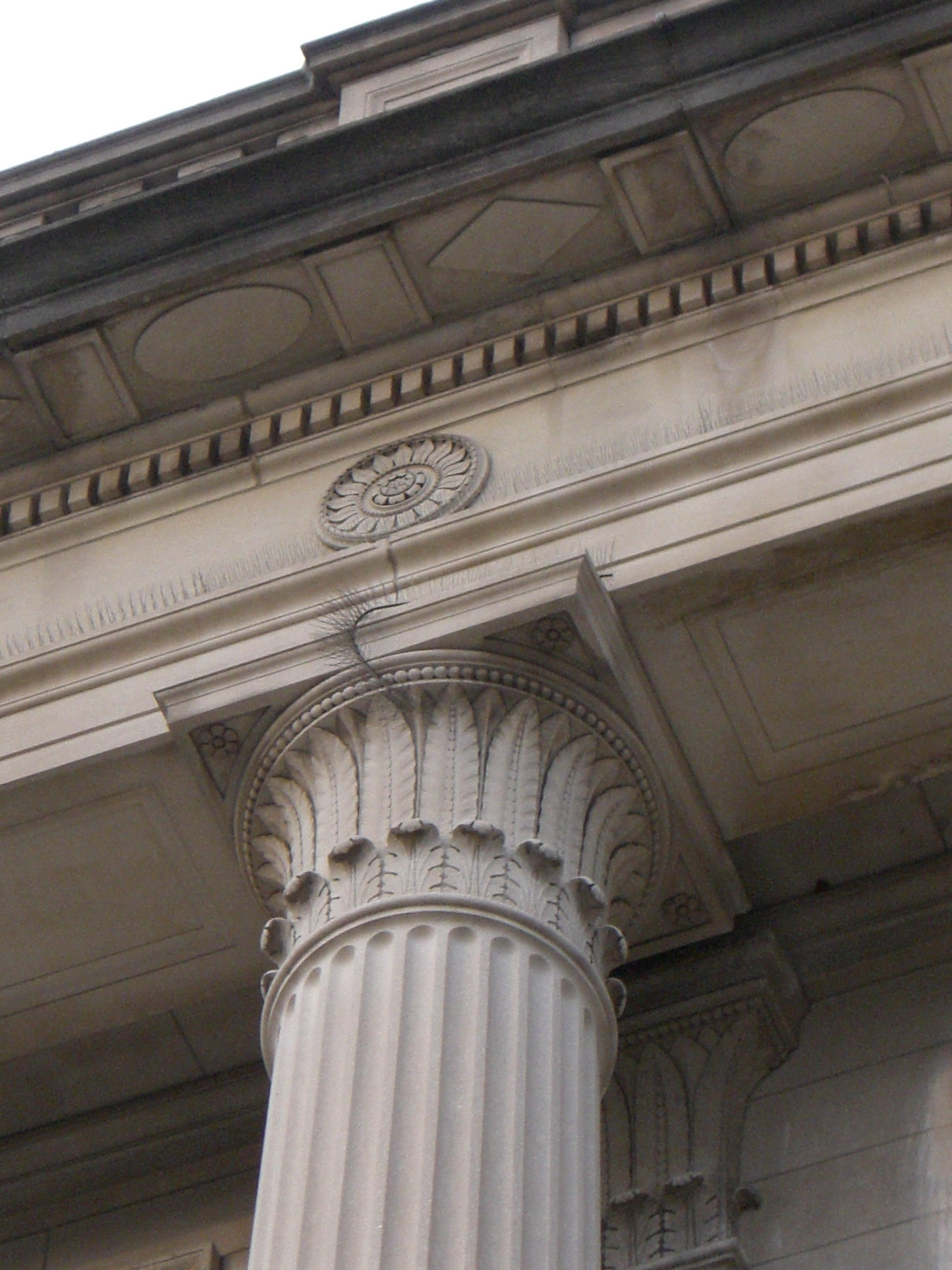
The capitals up close

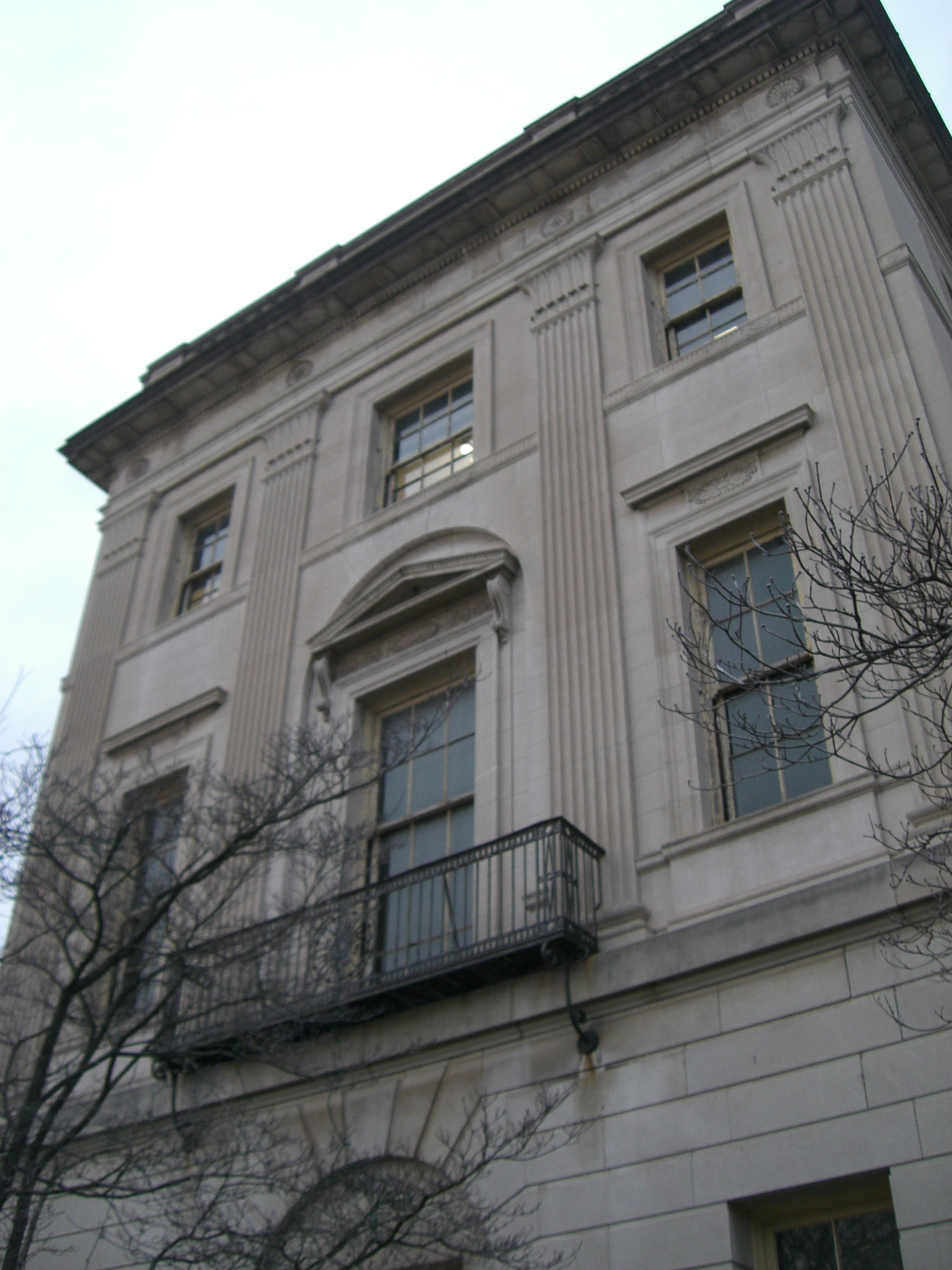
An end pavilion

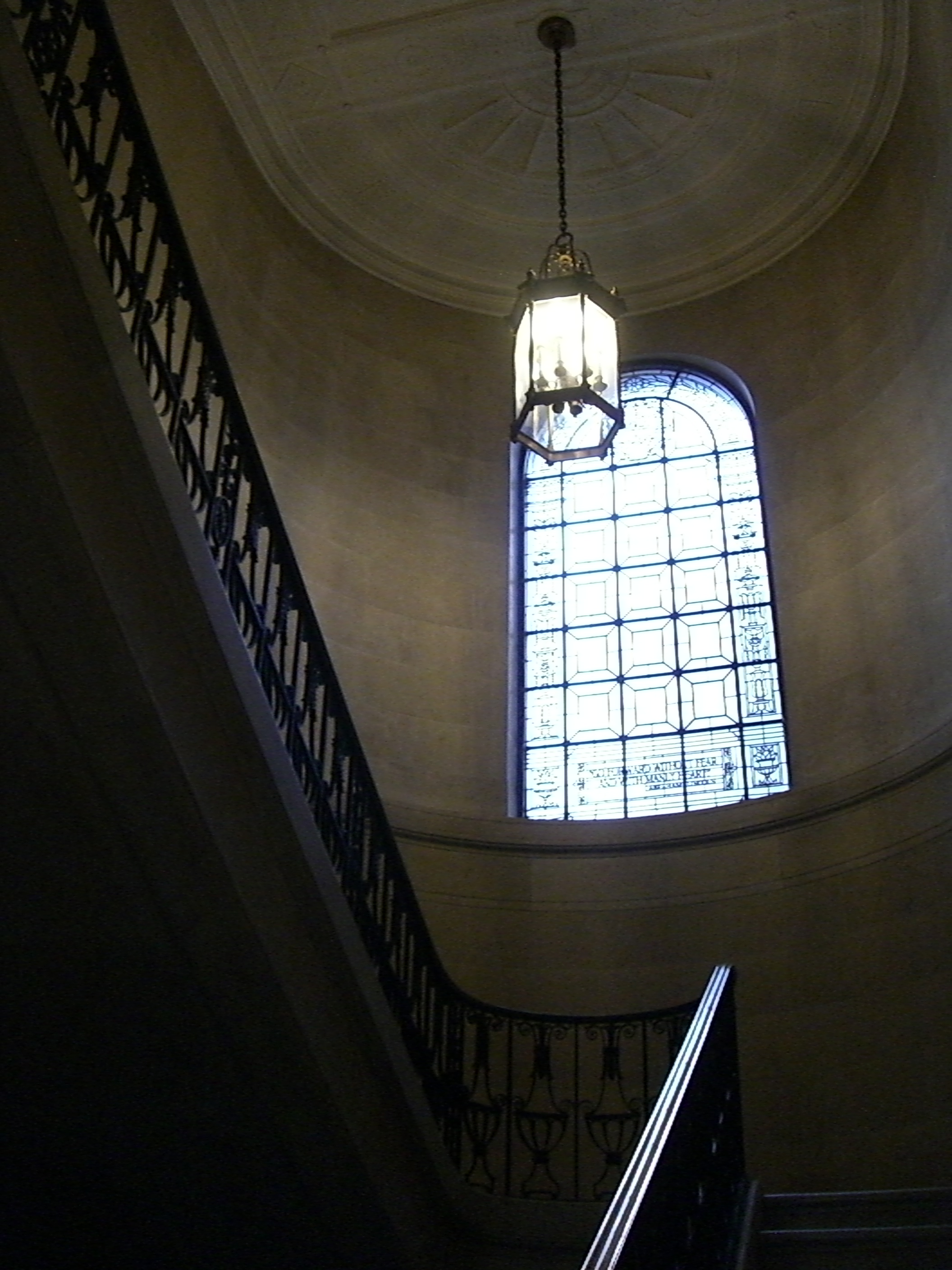
The staircase

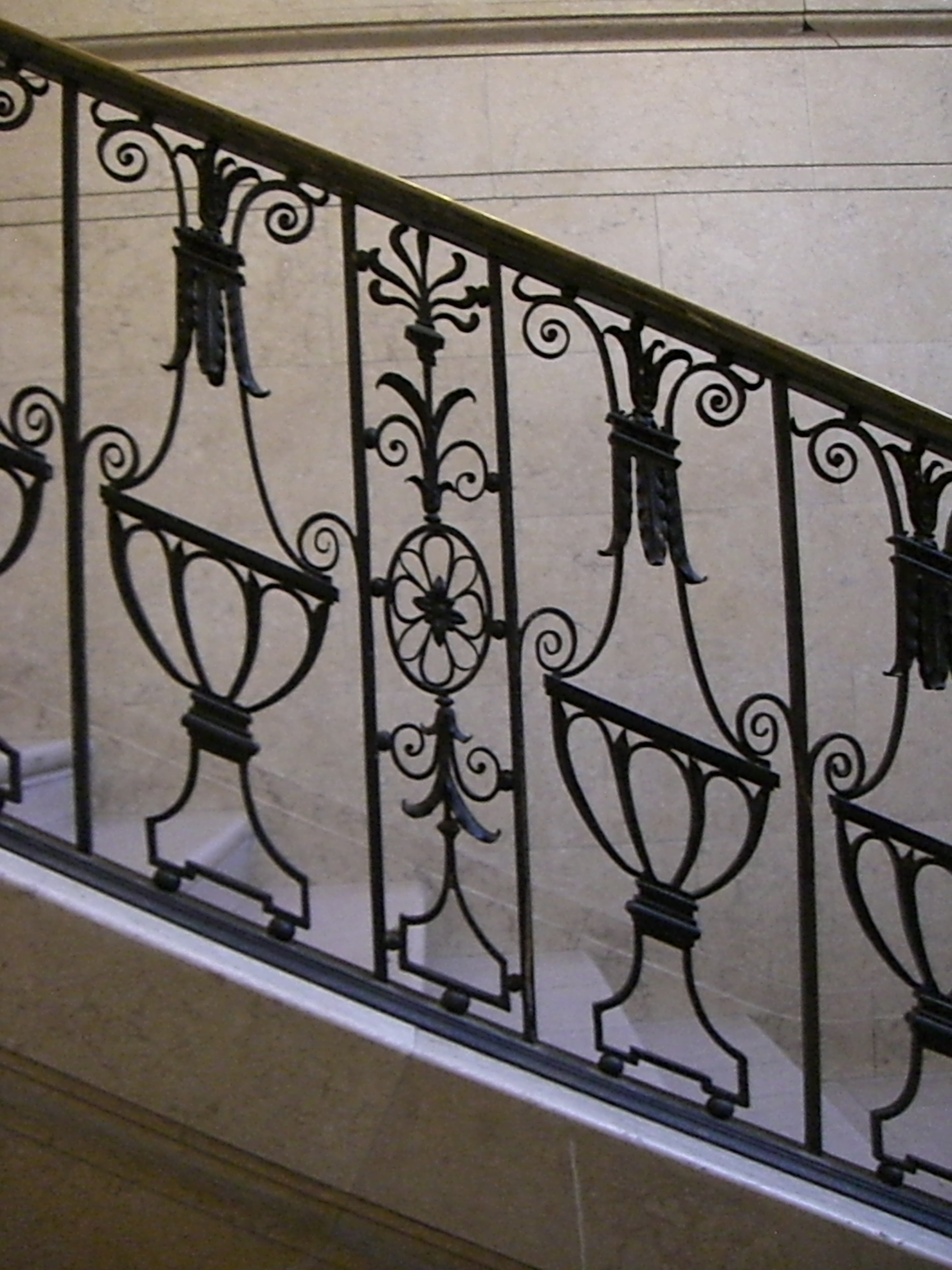
Ironwork on the staircase

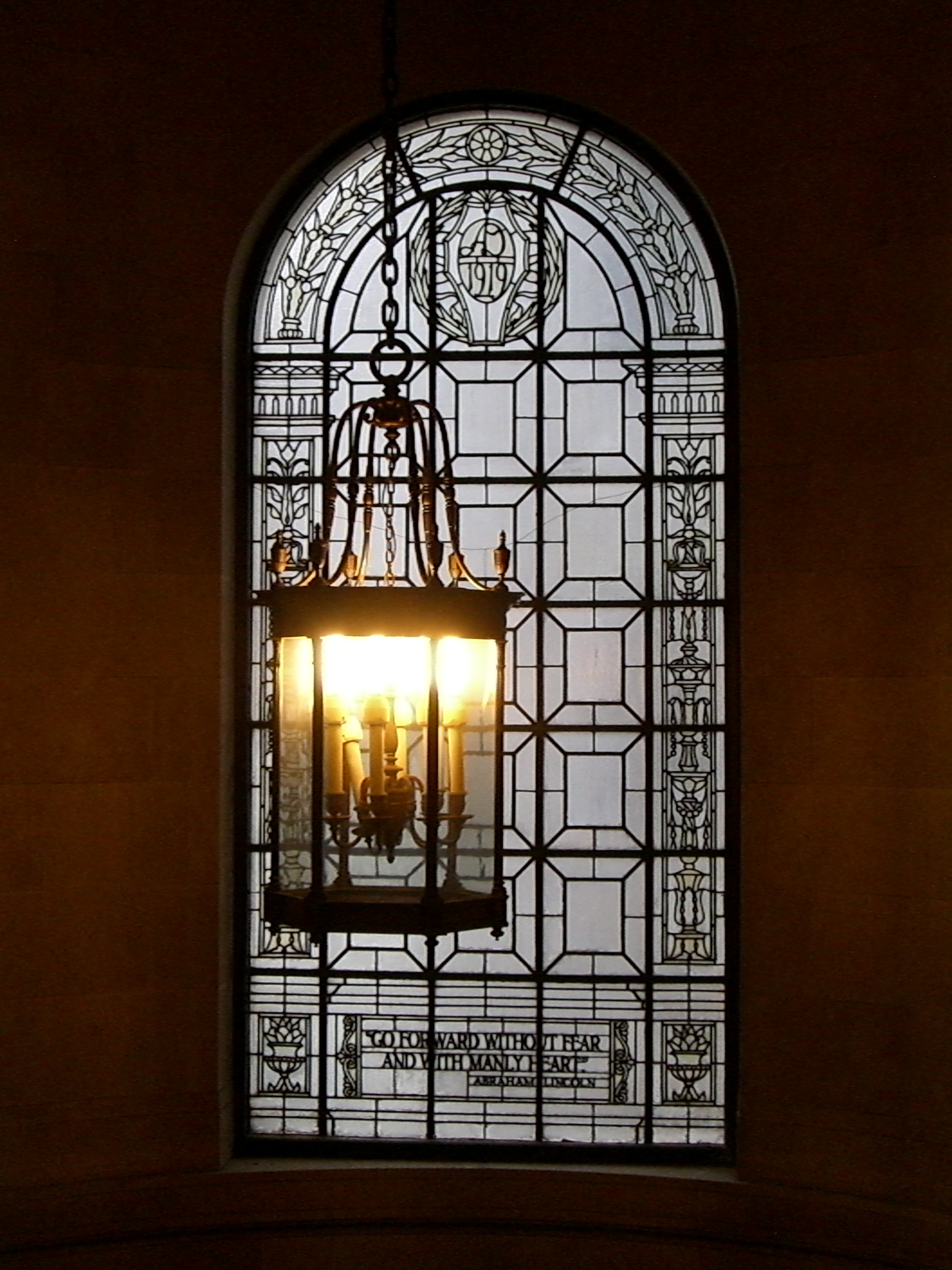
The stained glass window in the staircase

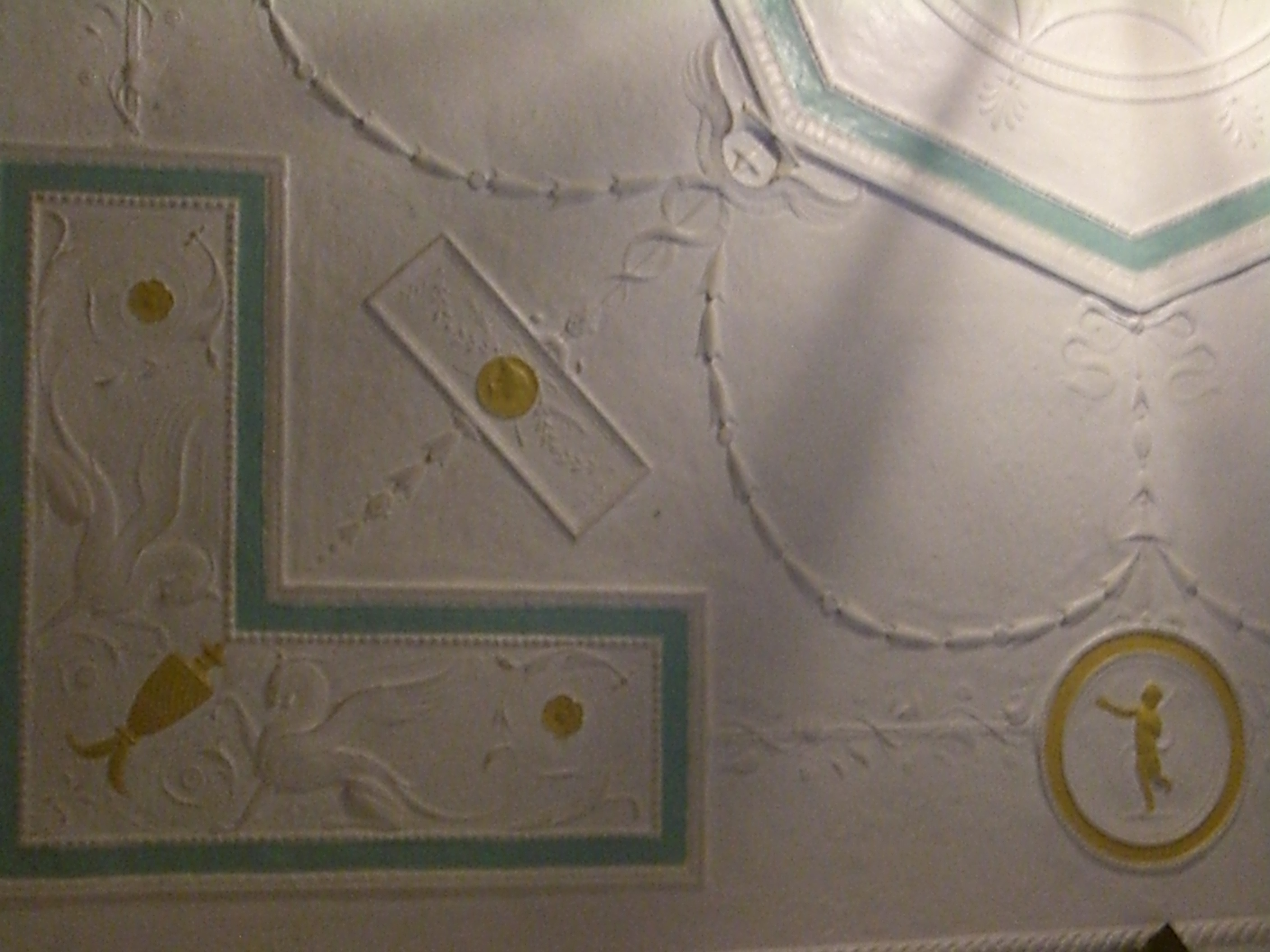
Some Adamesque ceiling decoration
