= Spalding Building =

Historic building in Portland, Oregon, U.S.

- U.S. National Register of Historic Places
- Portland Historic Landmark
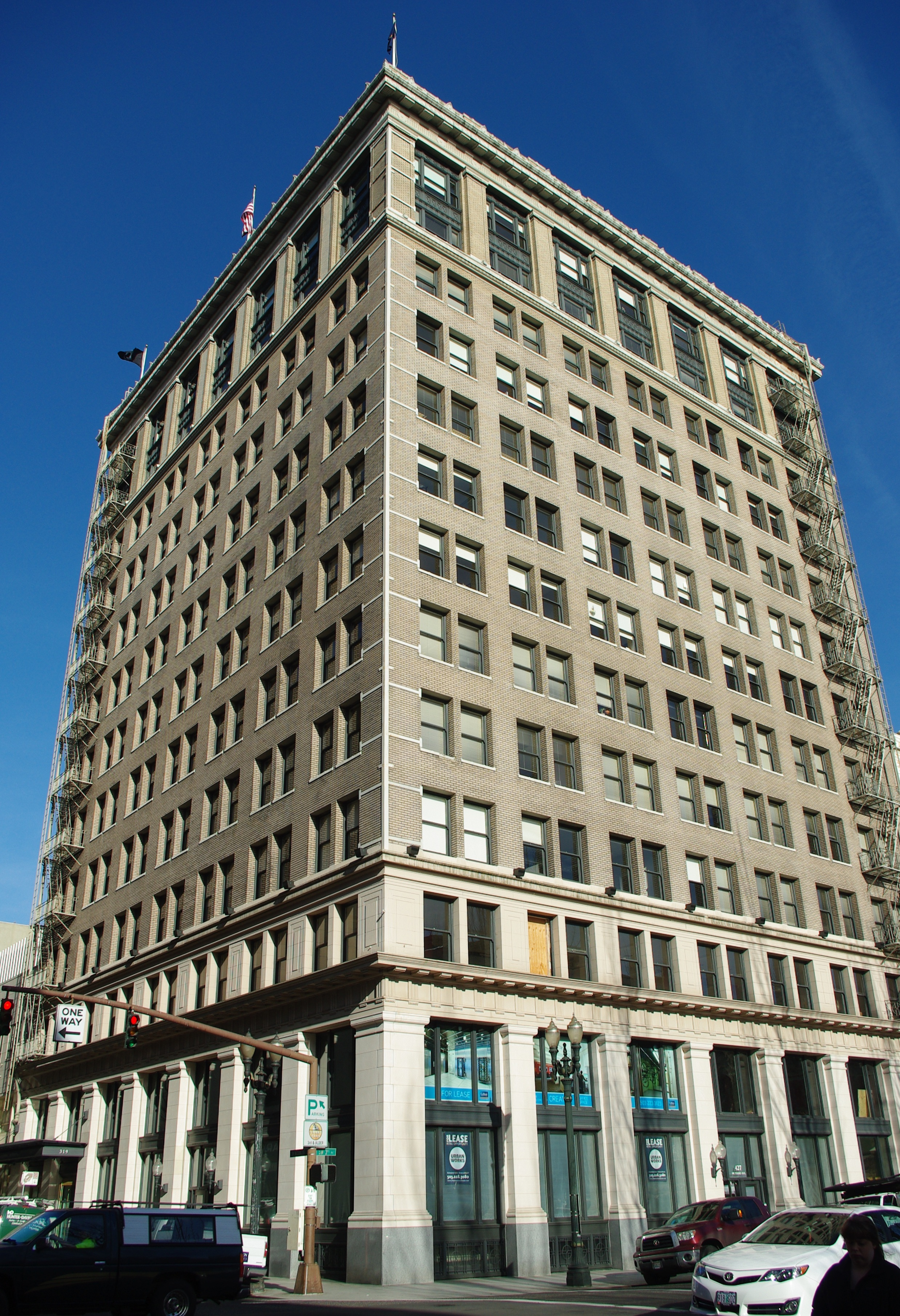
- The Spalding Building in 2015

- Location within Portland, Oregon Location within Oregon Location within the United States
- Location: 319 SW Washington Street; Portland, Oregon
- Coordinates: 45°31′11″N 122°40′30″W
- Built: 1911
- Architect: Cass Gilbert
- NRHP reference No.: 82001513
- Added to NRHP: October 7, 1982

The Spalding Building, formerly the Oregon Bank Building, is a historic office building in downtown Portland, Oregon, United States on the northwest corner of SW 3rd Avenue and Washington streets. Since 1982, it has been on the National Register of Historic Places.

Architect Cass Gilbert worked on the American Renaissance-style Spalding building while also working on the Woolworth Building in New York City. Completed in 1911, it was considered a skyscraper.

The 103,824-square-foot (9,645.6 m^{2}) building contains 12 above-ground floors, and its construction mimics a classical column: A base, a shaft, and a capital.

In spring 2016, Squarespace, a website-design company based in New York City, moved its Portland office to the Spalding Building, in newly renovated space used by around 150 employees.

== See also ==
- Architecture of Portland, Oregon
- National Register of Historic Places listings in Southwest Portland, Oregon
