= Sutton Hall (University of Texas at Austin) =

Coordinates: 30.2849°N 97.7408°W

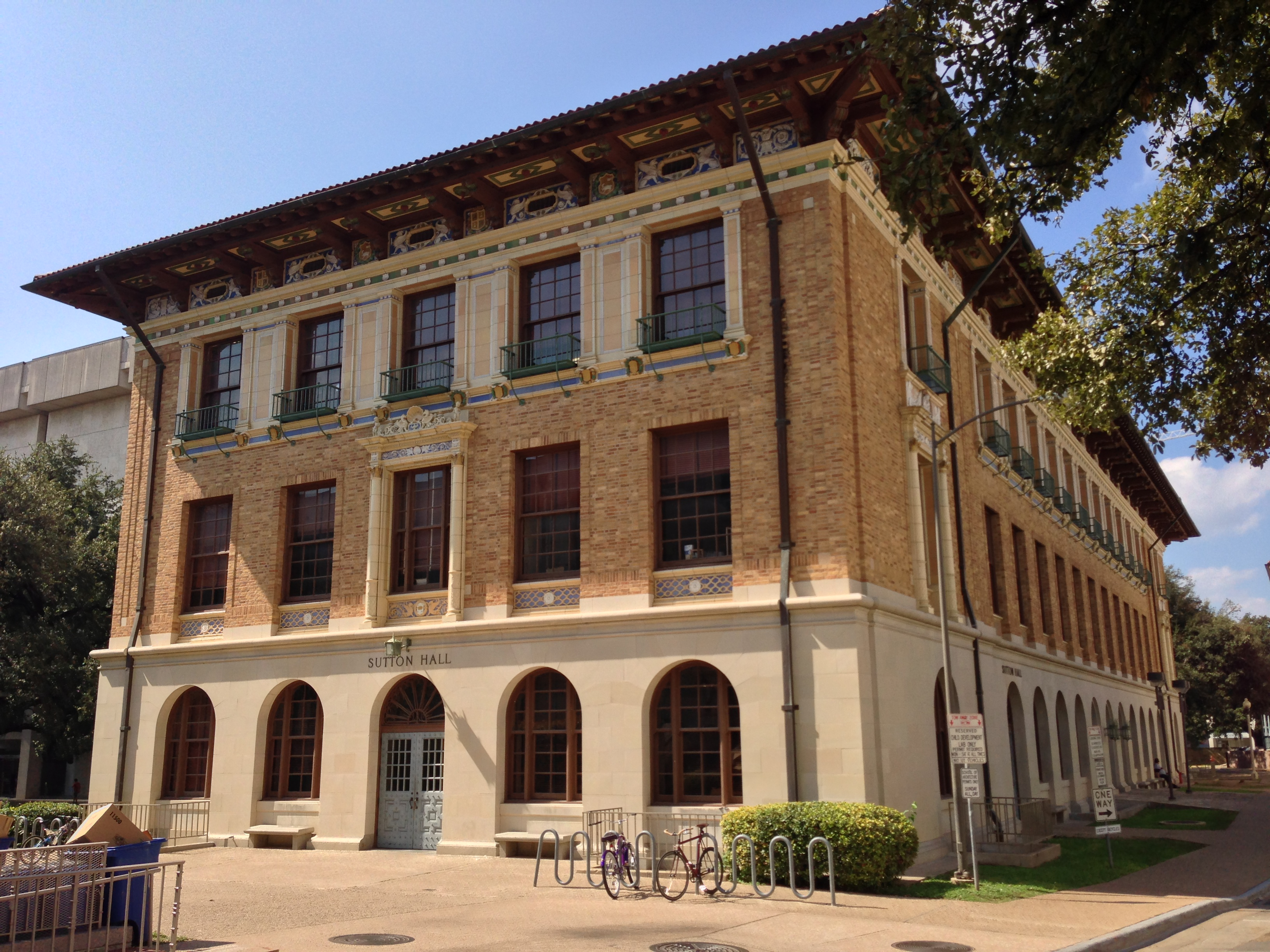
- Interactive map of the Sutton Hall area
- Alternative names: SUT

General information
- Architectural style: Spanish Renaissance
- Location: 305 Inner Campus Drive, Austin, Texas, United States
- Named for: William Seneca Sutton
- Owner: University of Texas at Austin

Technical details
- Floor count: 5
- Floor area: 59,498 sq ft (5,527.5 m^{2})

Design and construction
- Architect: Cass Gilbert

Sutton Hall, originally called The Education Building, is a building on the University of Texas at Austin campus, serving as one of the four buildings supporting the School of Architecture, the others being Battle Hall, West Mall Building, and Goldsmith Hall. It was designed by Cass Gilbert, who also designed Battle Hall, the architecture library on the same campus. Originally, Sutton Hall housed the College of Education.

In 1927, the University separated the Department of Psychology out of the Department of Philosophy, and moved Psychology out of Garrison Hall and onto the 3rd floor of Sutton Hall, where it would share space with the Department of Educational Psychology for the next 25 years.

Today, Sutton Hall houses architecture studios, labs, and offices, including graduate admissions for the school. It is also home to the Architectural Robotics Lab.

== See also ==
- History of The University of Texas at Austin
- List of University of Texas at Austin buildings
