= Goldsmith Hall =

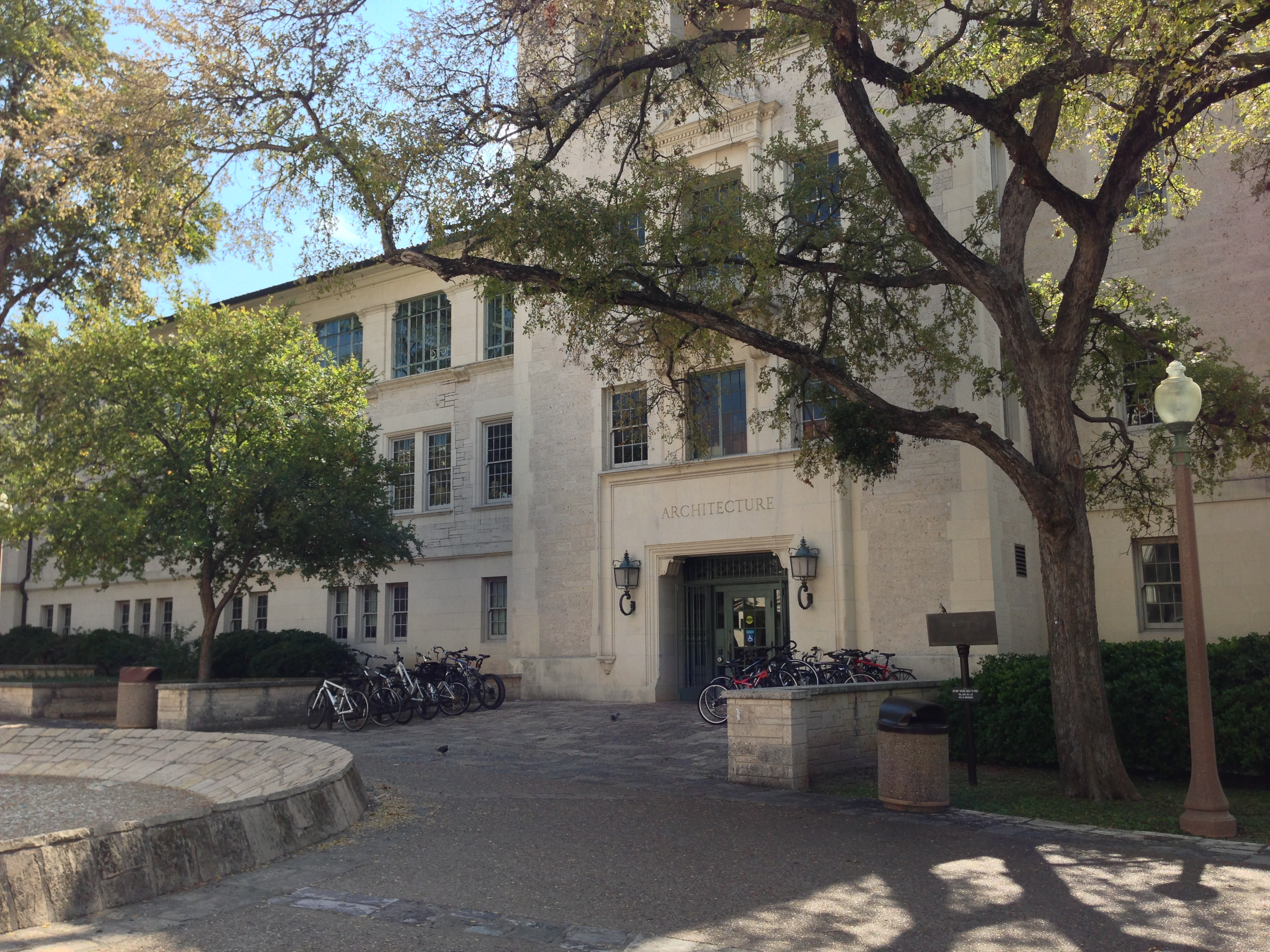
- Interactive map of the Goldsmith Hall area

General information
- Location: Austin, Texas, United States
- Coordinates: 30°17′8″N 97°44′28″W

Design and construction
- Architect: Paul Philippe Cret

Goldsmith Hall is a building on the University of Texas at Austin campus, serving as the primary home of the School of Architecture. It was designed by Paul Cret, who also designed the Main Building (a.k.a. the Tower), the Union Building, and the Texas Memorial Museum on the same campus.

== History ==
In March 1930, Paul Cret was contracted to become the consulting architect for the University of Texas, followed by a second contract in June 1931 to design ten new buildings.

== Features ==
The south wall of the building is graced by a sundial honoring Francisco Arumí-Noé designed by Jeff Barajas and dedicated on 6 November 2010.

The building houses the School of Architecture's wood shop, main office, and a variety of Interior and Architecture studios.

== See also ==
- History of The University of Texas at Austin
- List of University of Texas at Austin buildings

== Gallery ==
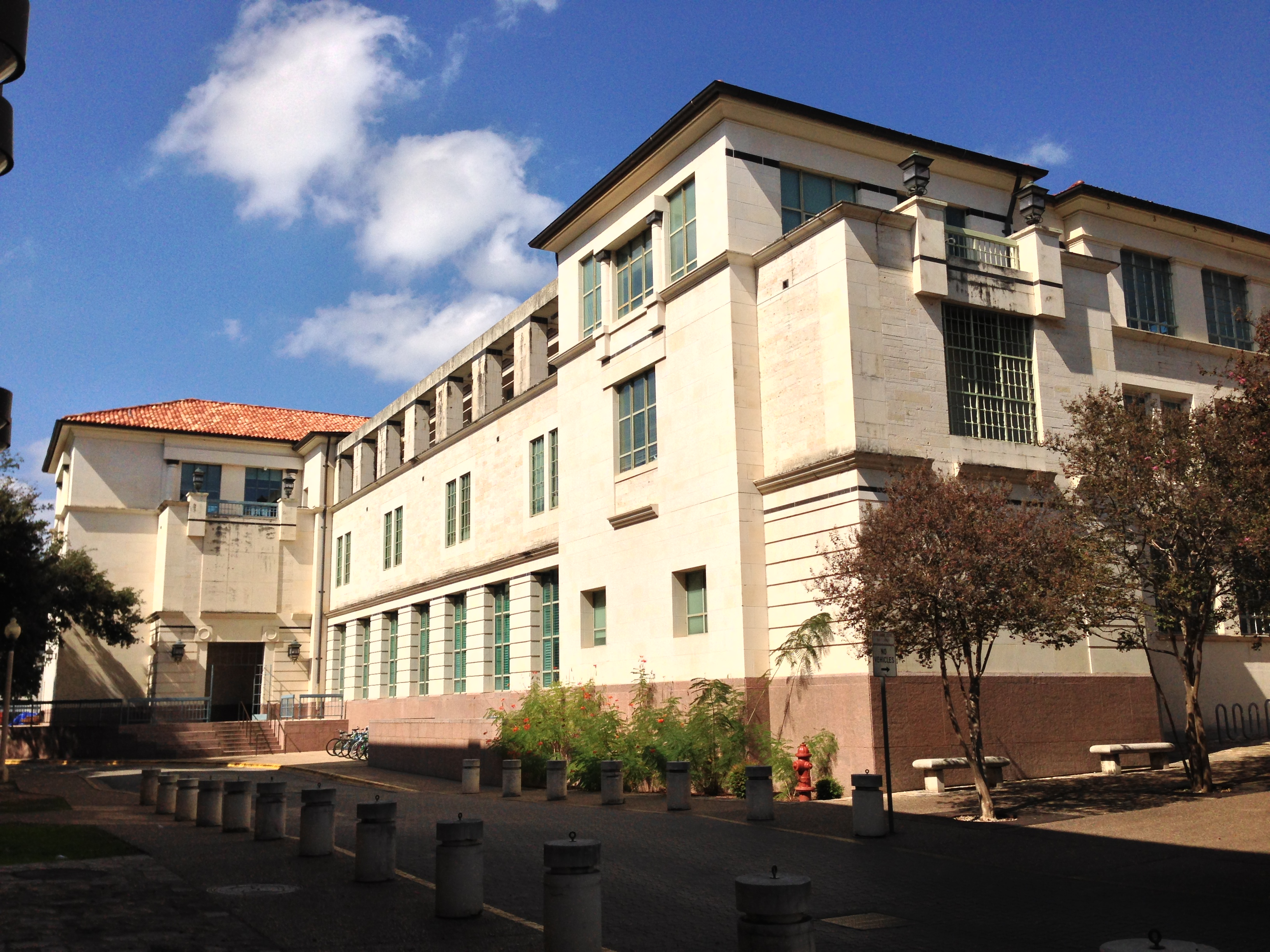
The new addition to Goldsmith Hall.

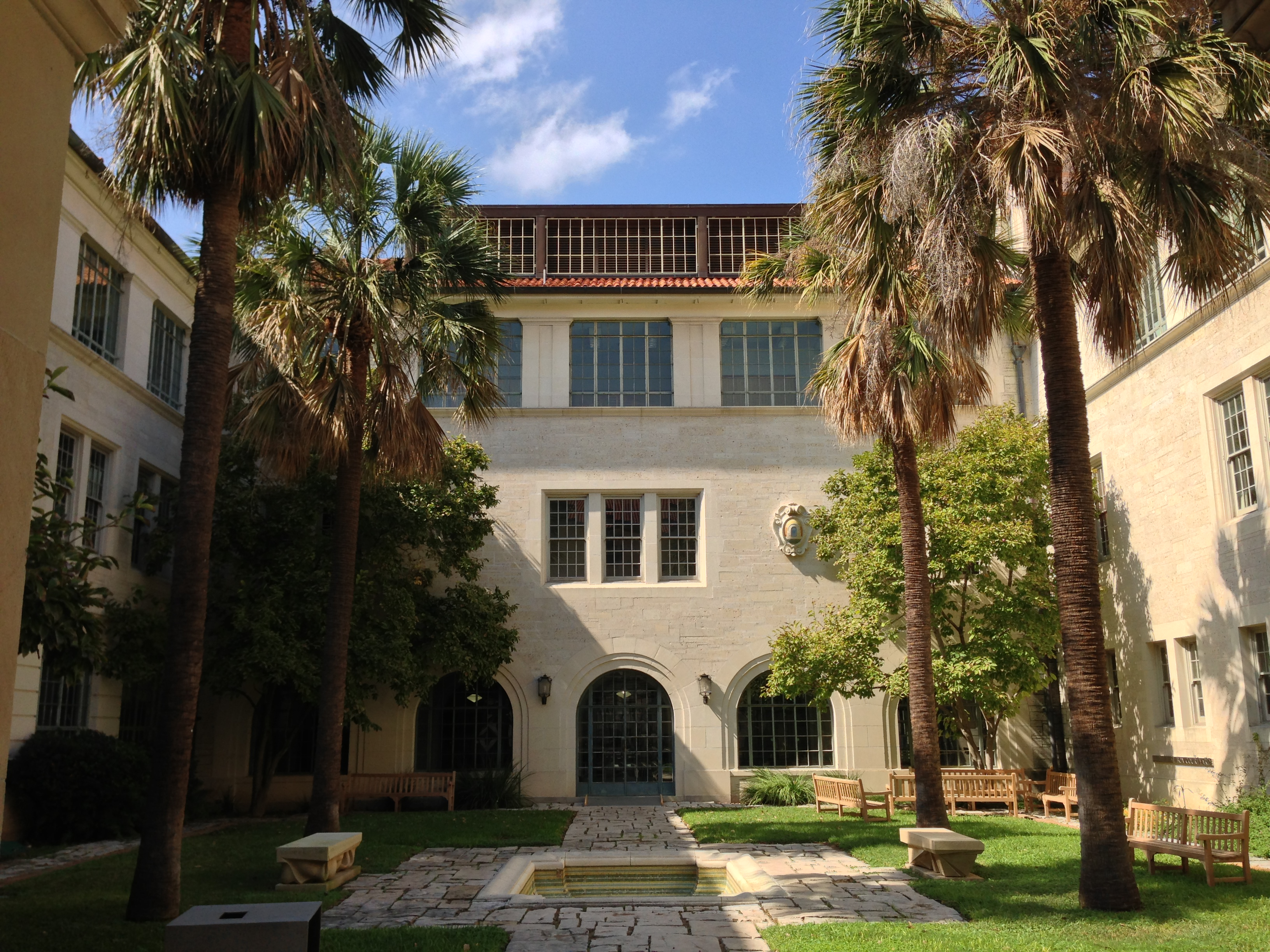
The courtyard of Goldsmith Hall.
