= Kat Kerwin =

Former Rhode Island politician

Former member of the Providence City Council from Ward 12
- In office January 7, 2019 – January 2, 2023
- Preceded by: Terrence Hassett
- Succeeded by: Althea A. Graves

Personal details
- Born: Katherine Kerwin; April 9, 1997 (age 29) Providence, Rhode Island
- Party: Democratic
- Education: Roger Williams University School of Law
- Alma mater: University of Wisconsin-Madison
- Profession: Attorney

Katherine Kerwin (born April 9, 1997) is a lawyer and former politician who served as the youngest member of the Providence City Council from 2019 until 2023, representing Ward 12.

== Education ==
Kerwin earned her BA in Political Science and Geography from the University of Wisconsin-Madison in 2019. In 2016, Kerwin appeared in local and national news for leading UW–Madison's Cocks Not Glocks campaign, which was based on a campaign organized by Jessica Jin at the University of Texas-Austin that called for people to display sex toys on their backpacks.

In 2023, Kerwin received a JD from Roger Williams University School of Law.

== Career ==
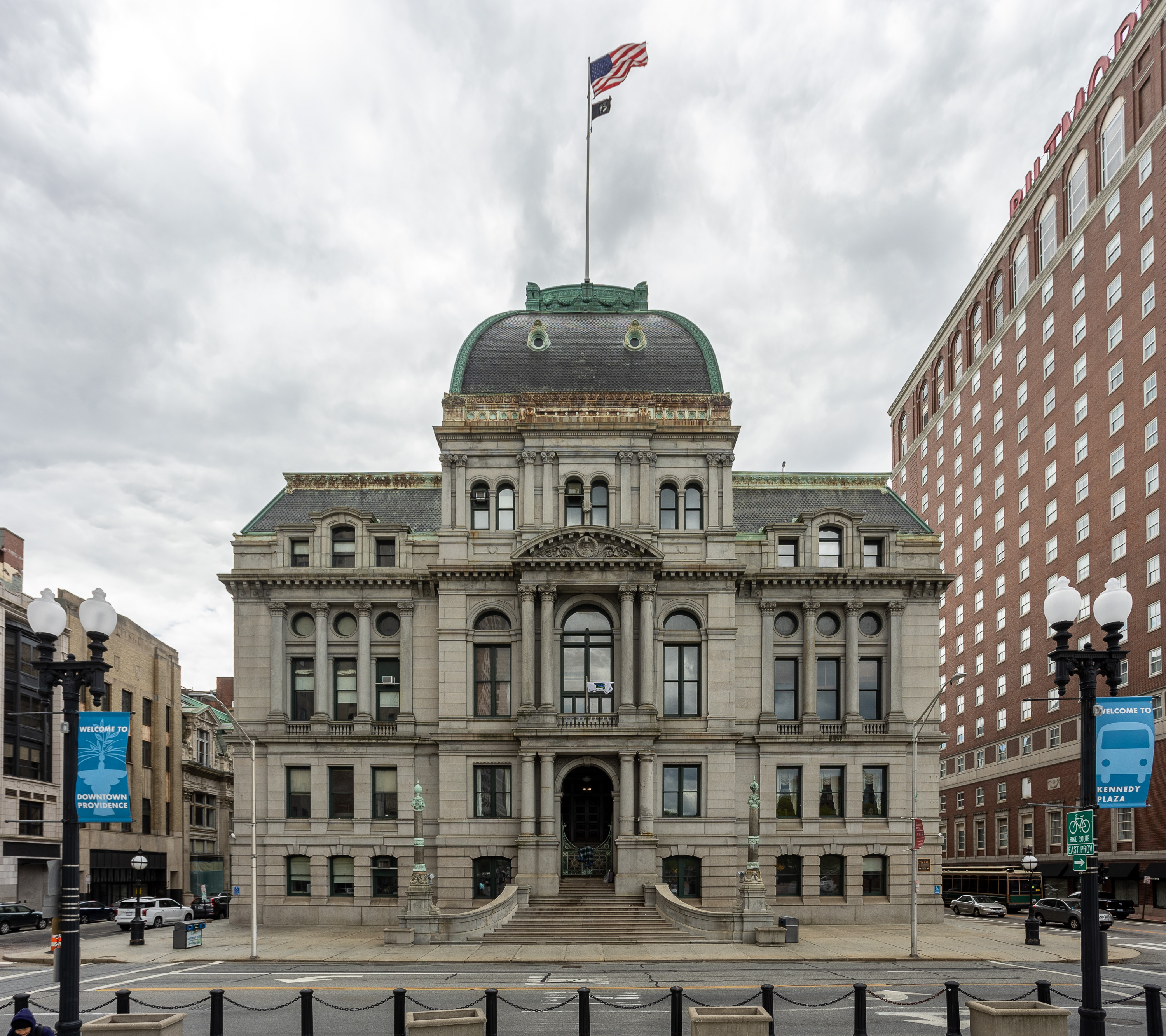
Providence City Hall in Rhode Island

Kerwin's first job involved working at Providence City Hall when she was 13.

In 2018, Kerwin ran against incumbent Terrence Hassett, who was first elected to the city council in 1997, the year Kerwin was born. Hassett did not submit enough signatures to get his name on the ballot in the 2018 City Council race, leading to an unopposed victory for Kerwin.

Kerwin ran for office with the stated goal of demonstrating Providence had the potential to be a national example of effective progressive policy-making. During her campaign and while in office, Kerwin said she experienced inappropriate comments from colleagues, due to her age.

In November 2018, Kerwin was elected, at 20 years old, into the first Providence City Council to have a female majority. On January 7, 2019, she was inaugurated. Kerwin was a part of the City Council's Ordinance Committee.

Kerwin served on Providence City Council until January 2, 2023. She did not seek a second term.

Kerwin is a 2023–2024 Justice Catalyst Fellow with Local Progress.

== Policy positions ==
In December 2018, Kerwin expressed concern over 200 employees who lost their jobs due to the closing of a local strip club after prostitution arrests. Kerwin supports decriminalization of sex work.

In October 2019, Kerwin voiced support for vandalism of a local Christopher Columbus statue, stating that civil disobedience is healthy and the statue should be removed for celebrating colonization.

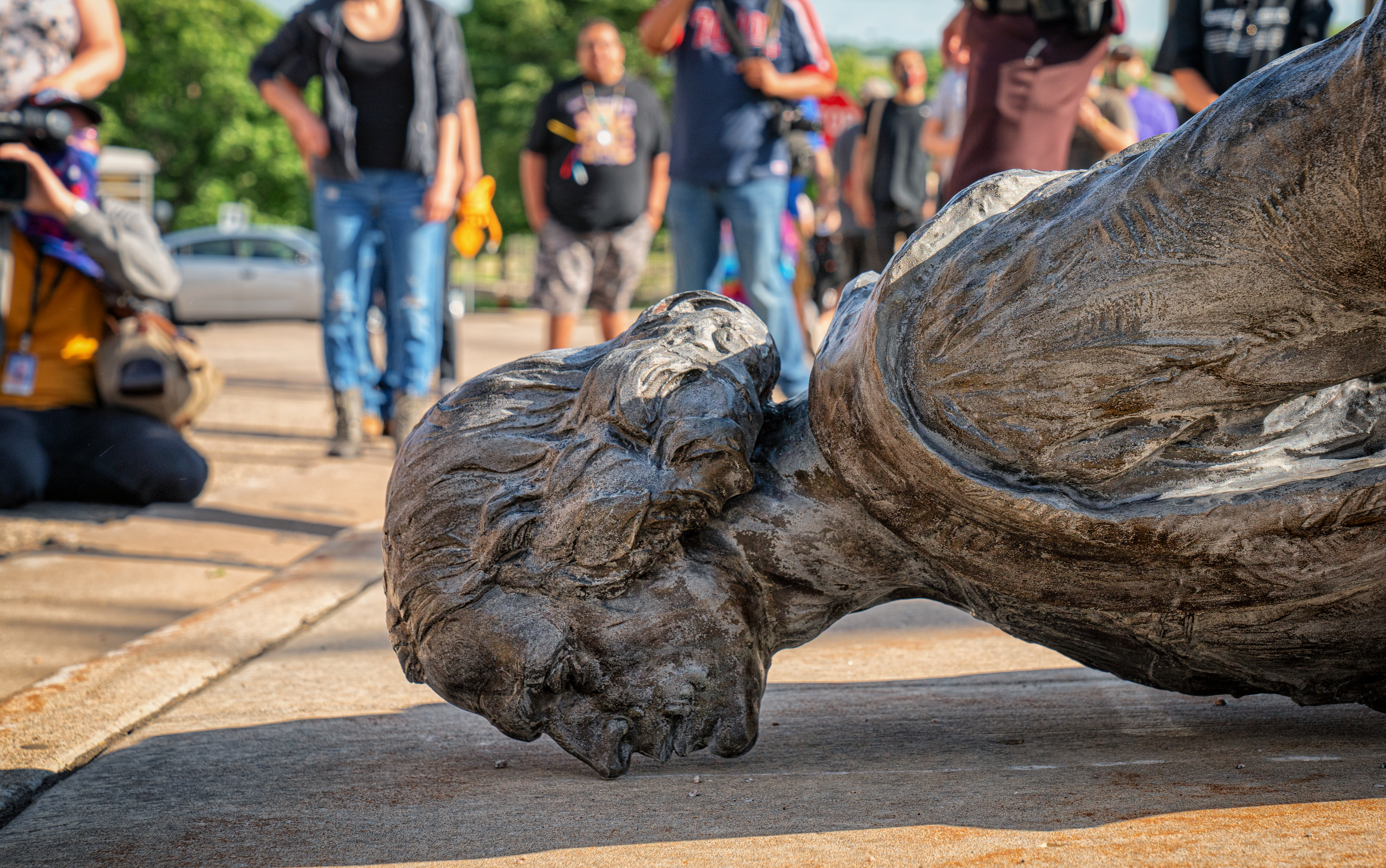
Christopher Columbus Statue Torn Down at Minnesota State Capitol on June 10, 2020

In November 2019, Kerwin co-wrote a letter in support of six homeless families relocated from New York City to Rhode Island, as part of New York City Mayor Bill de Blasio’s "Special One-Time Assistance Program." The letter was in response to public opposition of the program from Providence Mayor Jorge Elorza, Pawtucket Mayor Donald Grebien, and Woonsocket Mayor Lisa Baldelli-Hunt.

In December 2019, Kerwin voted against granting a 20-year, multi-million-dollar tax break to Jim Abdo to build Hotel Hive, a project located at 203 Westminster Street.

In December 2019, Kerwin supported Providence's Climate Justice Plan and co-sponsored a letter opposing any proposed facilities on Allens Avenue likely to worsen pollution and asthma rates.

In February 2020, Councilwoman Nirva LaFortune and Kerwin introduced a resolution calling on the Rhode Island Department of Education (RIDE) to increase funding for social and emotional learning and support services. The resolution called for RIDE to eliminate school-based School Resource Officers (SROs) in Providence's school district. Kerwin credited Providence youth organizers with advocating for a school district that no longer accepts the school to prison pipeline as the norm.

Map from 2018 of which U.S. states required School Resource Officer (SRO) training

In May 2020, Kerwin expressed disappointment towards Providence College administrators and students for hosting a superspreader block party, three months into the COVID-19 pandemic, in a neighborhood with majority Black and brown residents.

In July 2020, Kerwin intervened in a conflict between police and workers at a local bar. Workers stated they'd experienced multiple instances of police harassment and police stated they were present to respond to a noise complaint at the establishment. Providence police released body camera footage of the interaction, which included Kerwin using a swear word, to the press.

In October 2020, Kerwin co-sponsored a resolution opposing the Rhode Island Department of Transportation (RIDOT) Multi-Hub Bus System plan.

In October 2020, Kerwin facilitated a march for peace on Smith Hill, following escalating gun violence in the neighborhood. Kerwin spoke on the issue of local gun violence at Lock Arms for Peace's monthly gathering. Kerwin endorsed a ban on assault weapons; a ban on high capacity magazines; and the Safe Schools Act.

In January 2021, Kerwin joined other councilmembers in calling for State Representative Justin Price to resign following his support for and participation in the white supremacist insurrection on the Capitol.

In January 2021, Kerwin participated in a Dance Parade, held outside Providence City Hall, to call attention to the eviction crisis and to demand protections for renters and homeowners throughout Rhode Island.

In August 2021, Kerwin opposed political figures' comments about crime in Providence as a means to support investment in police during an emergency meeting of the Providence City Council. Kerwin cited lack of investment in low-income residents and young people as a reason for local crime.
