= University of Texas at Austin School of Architecture =

The University of Texas at Austin School of Architecture
- Type: Public
- Established: 1948
- Dean: Heather Woofter
- Students: 663
- Undergraduates: 316
- Postgraduates: 347
- Location: Austin, Texas; 30.285388°N 97.741184°W
- Website: soa.utexas.edu

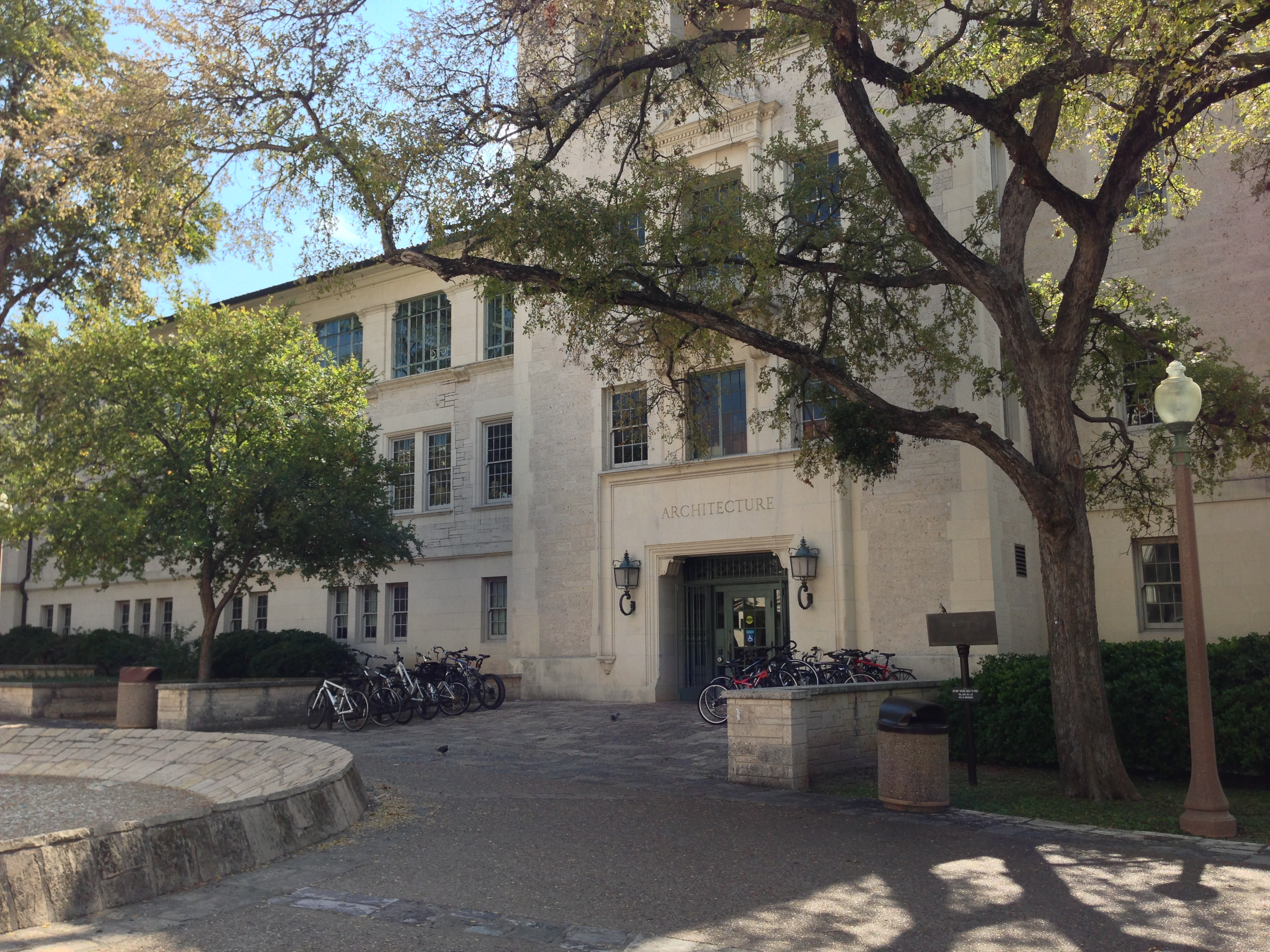
Goldsmith Hall from the West Mall

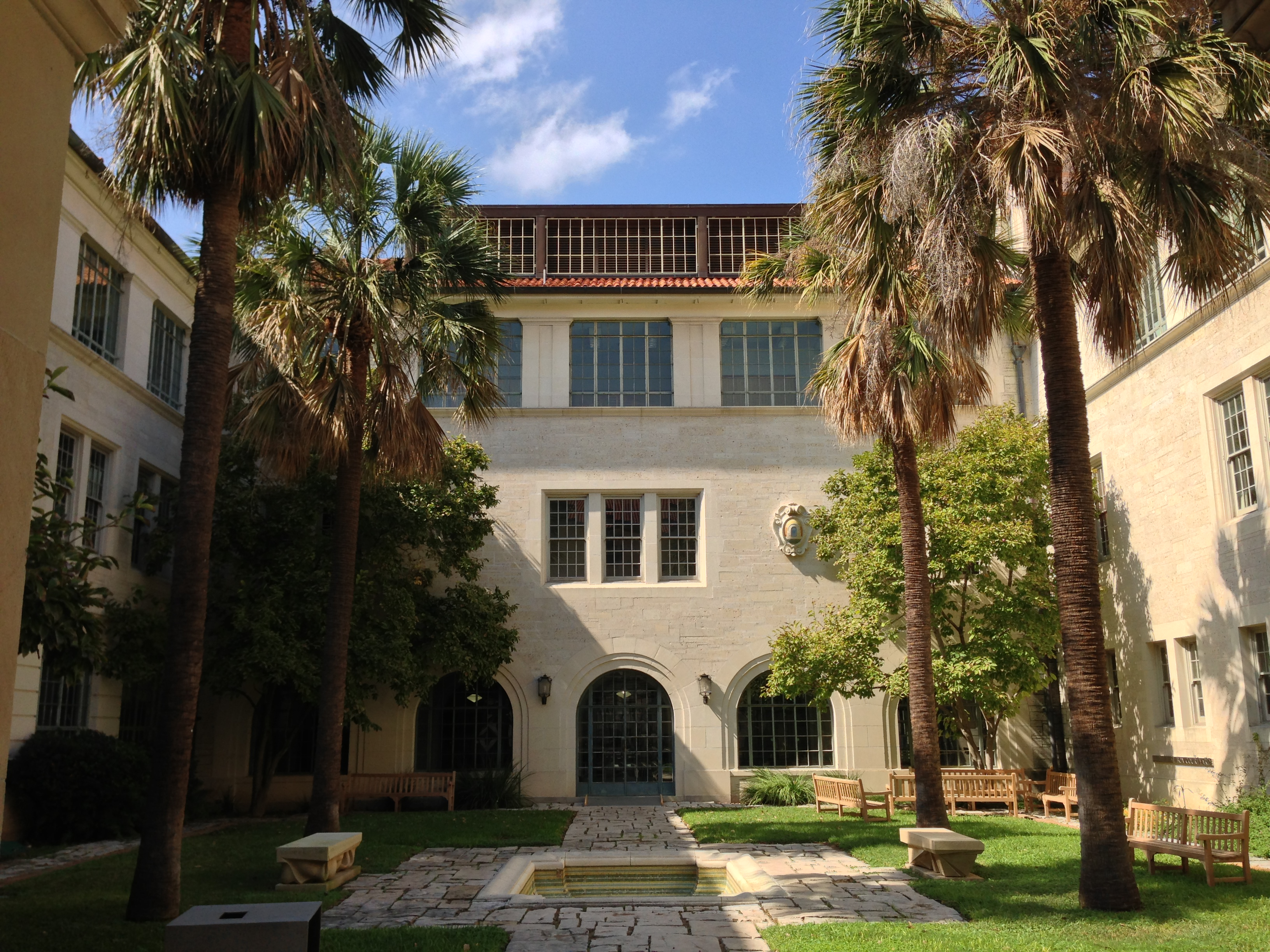
Eden & Hal Box Courtyard in Goldsmith Hall

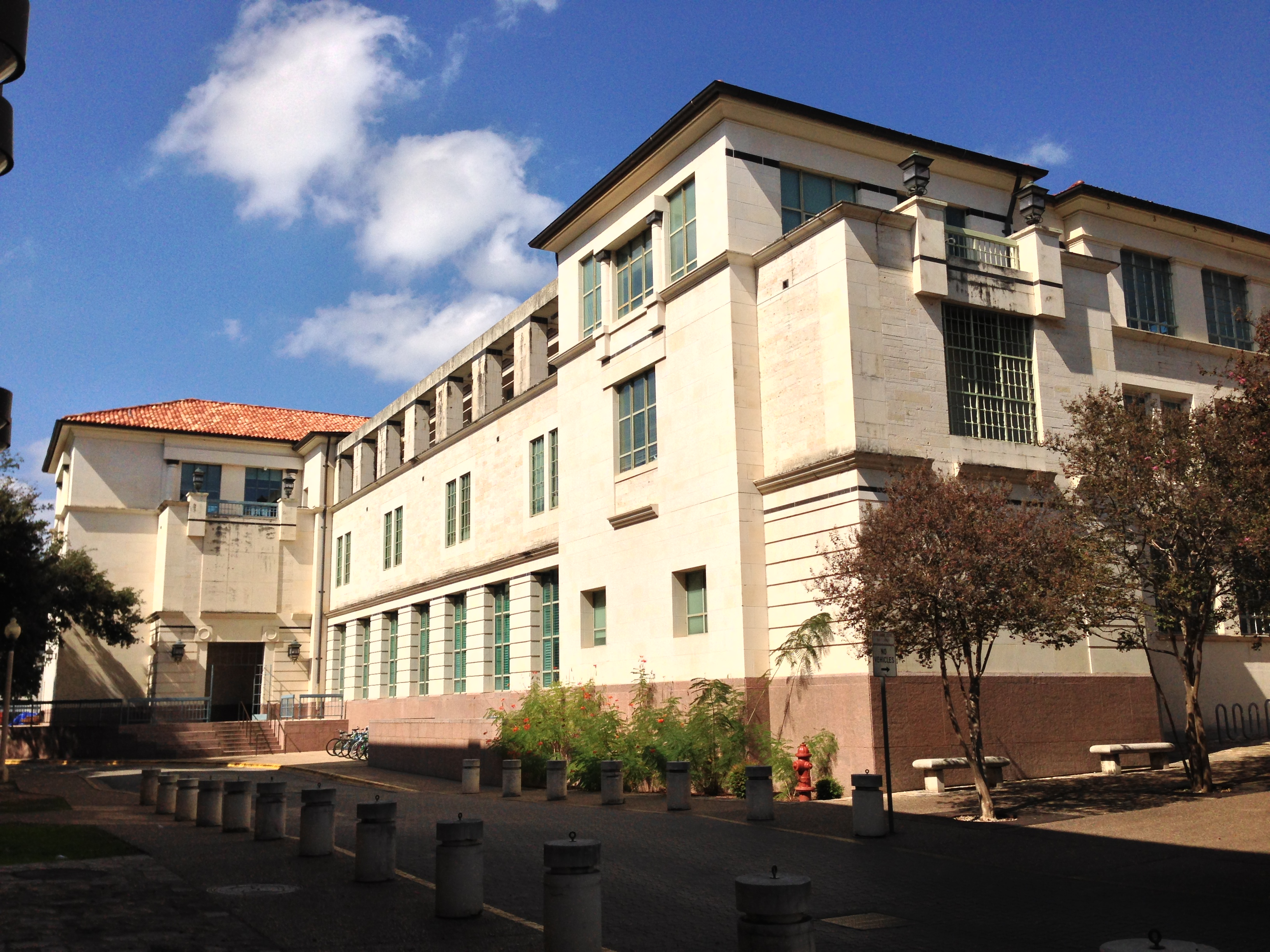
Goldsmith Hall from Inner Campus Drive

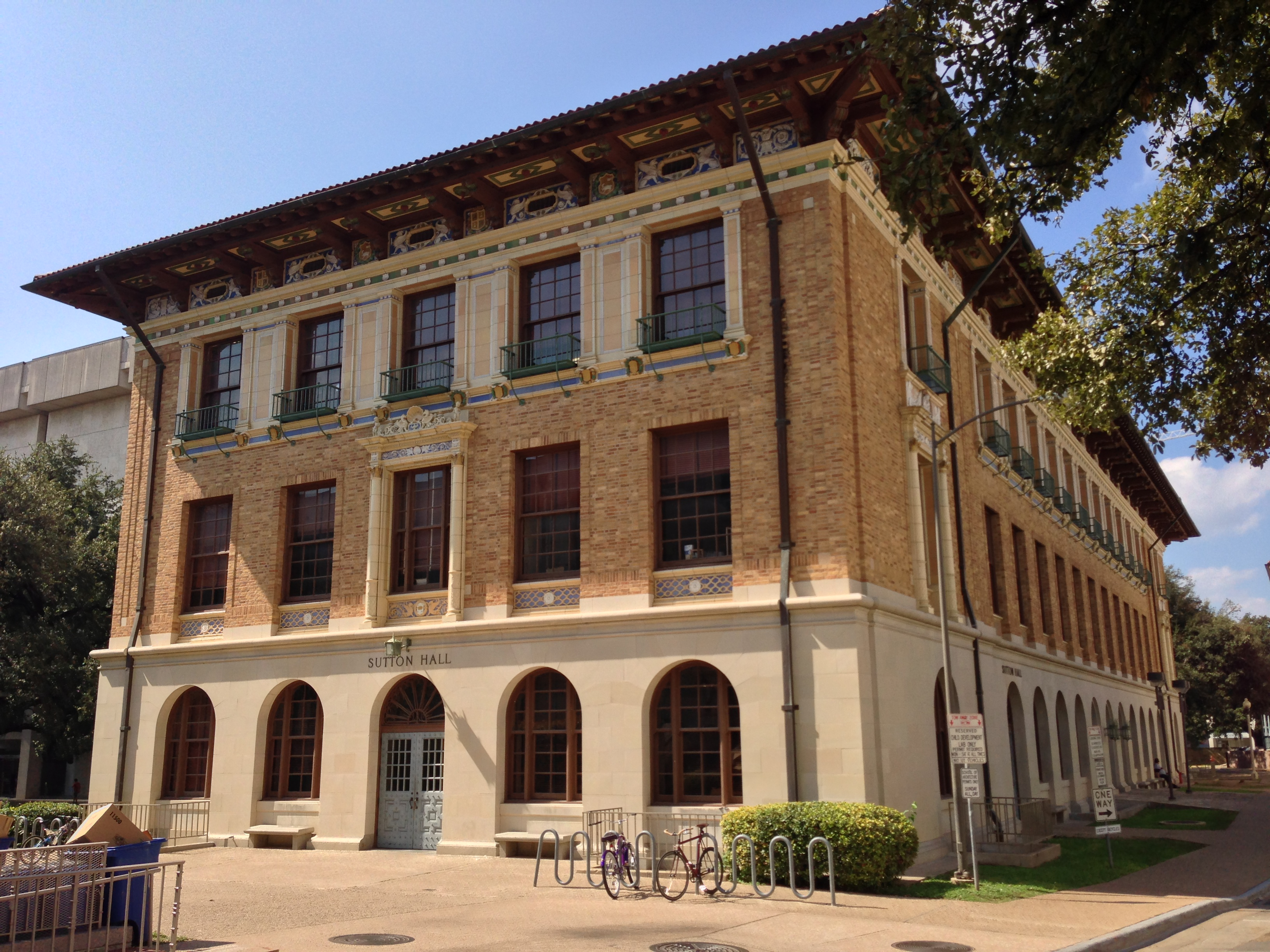
Sutton Hall from Inner Campus Drive

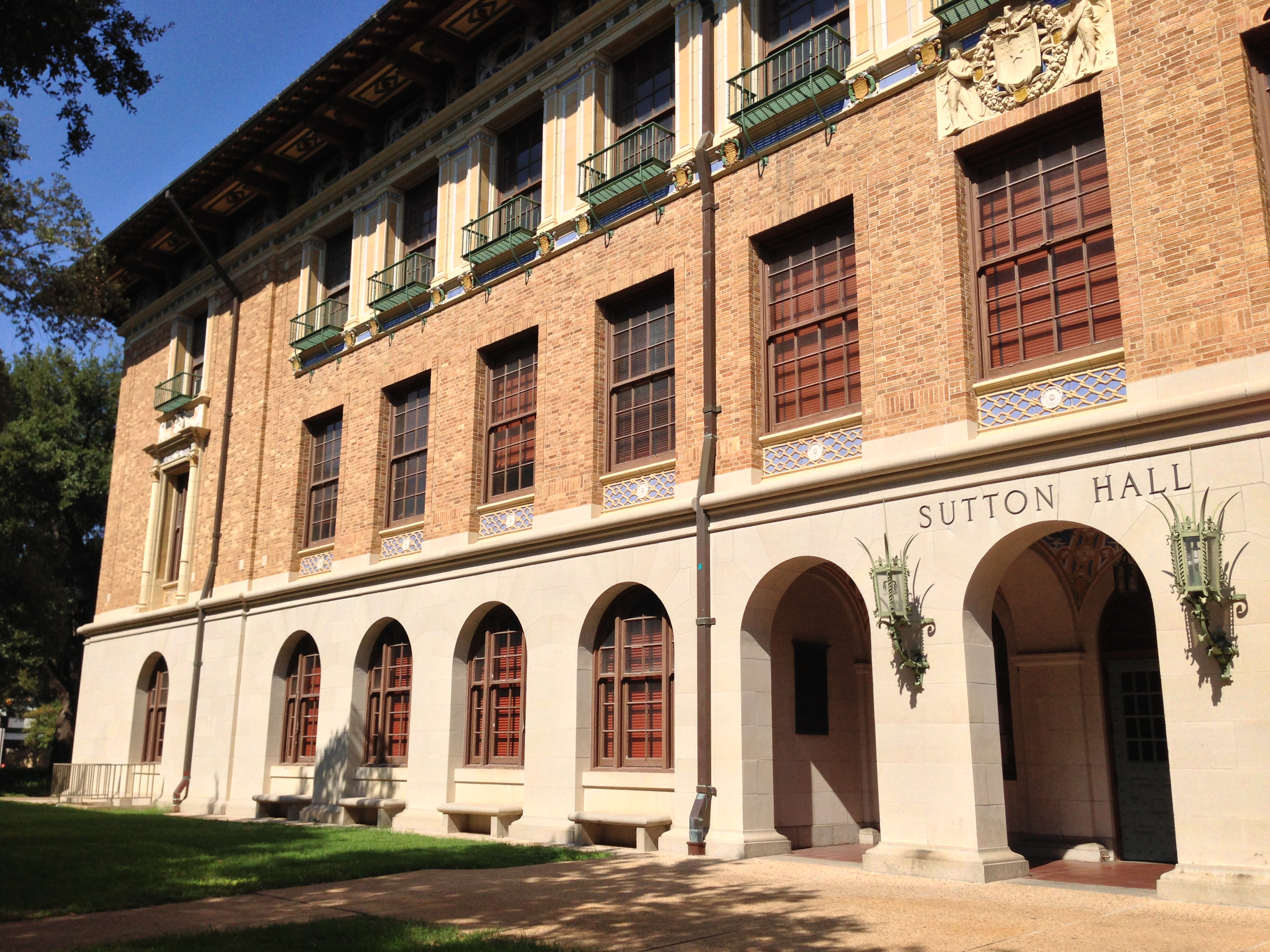
Sutton Hall, south side

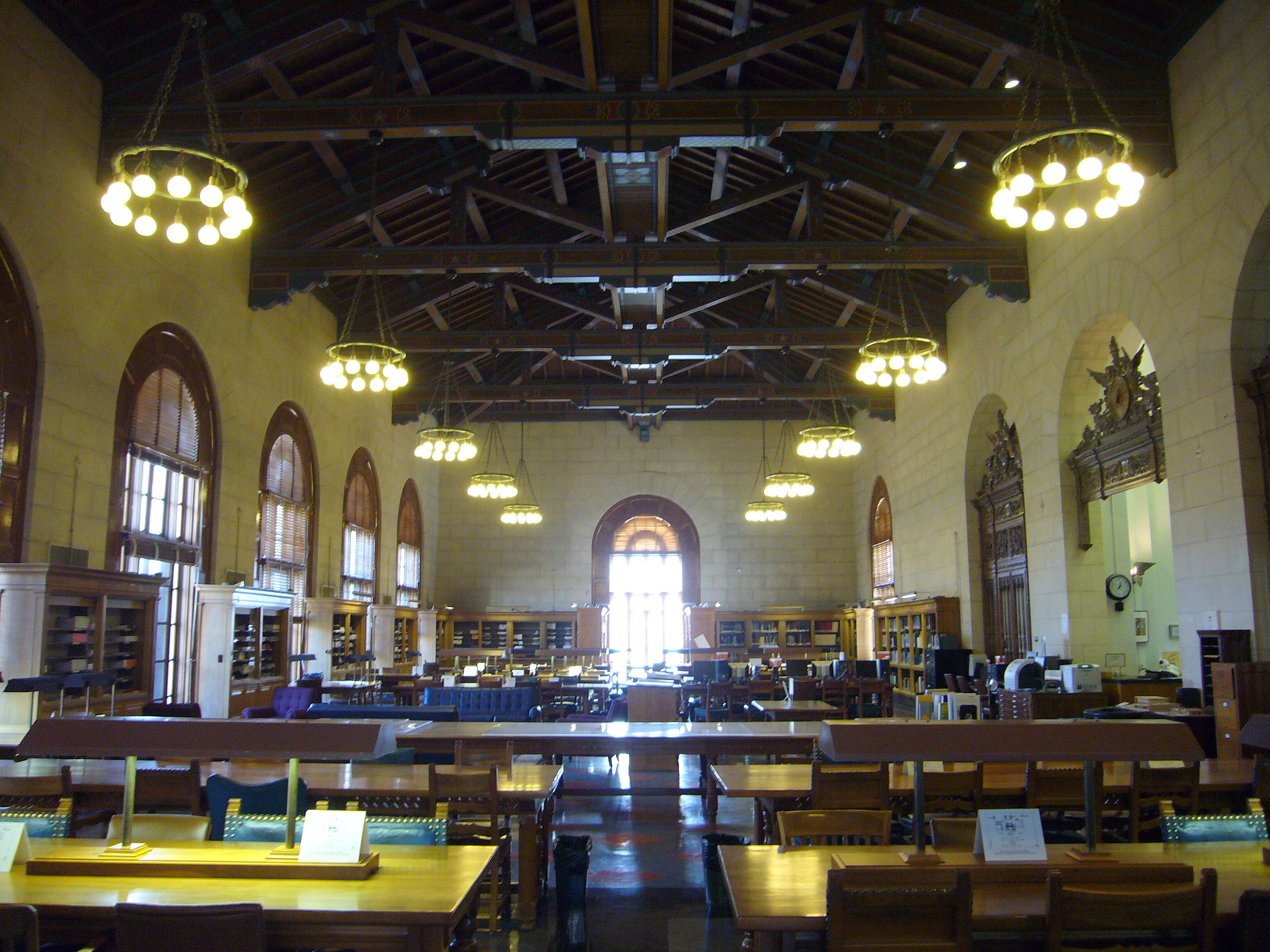
Interior of the Architecture & Planning Library in Battle Hall

The School of Architecture (SOA) is the architecture school of the University of Texas at Austin.

The school has nearly 700 graduate and undergraduate students. There are approximately 65 full-time faculty and 35 adjunct and part-time faculty. The student/faculty ratio is 10:1. The school has five faculty members that are Rome Fellows, including adjunct professor Coleman Coker, associate professors Hope Hasbruck, Mirka Benes, Nichole Wiedemann, and most recently, 2014 recipient Vincent C. Snyder.

The school is located within the historical core of the University of Texas at Austin campus. As part of the original 40 Acres, the college fully occupies Goldsmith Hall, Sutton Hall, and Battle Hall. In 2007, Battle Hall was listed as one of America's Top 150 Favorite Works of Architecture by The American Institute of Architects (AIA). SOA also occupies part of the West Mall Office Building.

Two of these buildings were designed by Cass Gilbert and another by Paul Philippe Cret. Cret is credited as the designer of the campus master plan for The University of Texas at Austin, and helped to build the Beaux-Arts-style Main Building tower. Cret collaborated with Herbert M. Greene (of Texas firm Greene, LaRoche, and Dahl) and SOA Class of 1921 alumnus Robert Leon White for several of his projects.

SOA celebrated its centennial in 2010, with a keynote by SOA alumnus Craig Dykers of Snøhetta.

== History ==
In 1910, The University of Texas at Austin College of Engineering (now known as the Cockrell School of Engineering) began offering a professional degree in architecture. Two years later, the program had over 30 registered students. The school was expanded over the next two decades under the leadership of Frederick Giesecke and Goldwin Goldsmith. In 1925, the school became the first in Texas to be accepted for membership in the Association of Collegiate Schools of Architecture. The program was accredited in 1935 by the National Architectural Accreditation Board. The school moved into its permanent home in the Architecture Building (Goldsmith Hall, named after Goldwin Goldsmith) in 1933 and became the School of Architecture in 1948. The school's first graduate was Bertram Ernst Giesecke, who was officially licensed as an architect in 1927.

In 2016, dean Frederick "Fritz" Steiner, stepped down citing Texas Government Code Section 411.2031, also known as "Campus Carry," which entitles licensed individuals to carry concealed handguns onto the campus of an institution of higher education. Michelle Addington was then appointed the position. In 2023, Heather Woofter became the dean of the college.

== Past and present leaders ==
- Hugo F. Kuehne, Chairman (1910 – May 1912)
- F.E. Giesecke, Chairman (June 1912 – August 1928)
- T.U. Taylor, Acting Chairman (September 1927 – May 1928)
- Goldwin Goldsmith, Chairman (June 1928 – May 1935)
- Walter T. Rolfe, Chairman (June 1935 – May 1946)
- Hugh McMath, Chairman (June 1946 – June 1950)
- Robert Talley, Acting Director (July 1950 – August 1951)
- Harwell Hamilton Harris, Director (September 1951 – June 1955)
- Hugh McMath, Acting Director (July 1955 – July 1956)
- Philip D. Creer, Dean (August 1956 – August 1967)
- Alan Y. Taniguchi, Director (September 1967 – August 1968)
- Alan Y. Taniguchi, Dean (September 1968 – May 1972)
- Sinclair Black, Acting Dean (June 1972 – July 1973)
- Charles Burnette, Dean (August 1973 – December 1975)
- John A. Gallery, Acting Dean (January 1976 – August 1976)
- Harold "Hal" Box, Dean (September 1976 – 1992)
- Lawrence Speck, Dean (1992 – July 2001)
- Frederick "Fritz" Steiner, Dean (August 2001 – June 2016)
- Elizabeth Danze, Acting Dean (July 2016 – June 2017)
- Michelle Addington, Dean (July 2017 – June 2023)
- Heather Woofter, Dean (June 2023 – present)

== Facilities, and research units, libraries, and centers ==
SOA is home to:

- Architectural Robotics Lab The Architectural Robotics Lab, located in Sutton Hall at the University of Texas at Austin School of Architecture, represents a pioneering initiative in the integration of robotics into architectural research and design. Established in 2014, the lab focuses on the exploration and development of robotic technology to enhance architectural fabrication and construction processes. It serves as a hub for interdisciplinary research, bringing together experts from architecture, engineering, computer science, and robotics;
- The Center for American Architecture and Design (CAAD), which focuses on architectural history, theory, and criticism. The CAAD produces a series of publications and hosts several symposia annually, including Latitudes, an international conference that explores American modern architecture;
- The Center for Sustainable Development (CSD), which studies the environment, social equity, economics, and design aesthetics. The CSD's two Thermal Labs analyze energy efficiency in building materials and architectural designs. Additionally, the CSD offers a summer Public Interest Design Program for advanced students from across the nation who are interested in the built environment and public service;
- The Lady Bird Johnson Wildflower Center, a botanical garden focused on sustainable research and education. The LBJWC is located off-campus in south Austin;
- The University Co-op Materials Resource Center, which has over 27,000 pieces of literature and material samples available for research within the SOA community. The MatLab is home to the Architectural Conservation Lab, a research space;
- The Alexander Architectural Archives is a unit of The University of Texas Libraries within the Architecture & Planning Library. The archives support research and education about the history of the built environment by acquiring and preserving research collections;
- The Architecture & Planning Library is a research branch of The University of Texas Libraries system and aims to serve the research needs of scholars in the disciplines of architecture, landscape architecture, interior design, and planning;
- The Visual Resources Collection, a library resource that contains more than 250,000 slides and 100,000 digitized images.

== Student organizations ==
SOA student organizations include:

- Undergraduate Architecture Student Council (UASC), which serves as a liaison between students and faculty members, as well as administrators;
- Graduate School of Architecture Representative Council (GSARC), a group focused on supporting the voice of graduate students;
- Alpha Rho Chi (APX), a professional/social co-ed fraternity for students in architecture and allied arts;
- Ampersand, which combines the student chapters of the International Interior Design Association (IIDA) and the American Society of Interior Designers (ASID) to promote networking and involvement within the interior design community;
- National Organization of Minority Architecture Students (NOMAS), which aims to enhance educational and professional networking for students from diverse backgrounds;
- Global Architecture Brigades, a student-led design/build organization that seeks to improve the quality of life in developing nations through the design of sustainable, socially responsible solutions to architectural problems;
- Community and Regional Planning Student Organization (CRPSO), a group that works to host a variety of activities for students in the school's planning program and planning-related disciplines;
- Student Historic Preservation Association, which represents Historic Preservation graduate students;
- ISSUE:, an annual student publication featuring graduate and undergraduate student work;
- Tau Sigma Delta, an honors society for advanced students pursuing architectural study and the allied arts;
- American Society of Landscape Architects Student Chapter, an organization for students of landscape architecture;
- American Institute of Architecture Students (AIAS), a professional organization whose mission is to promote the advancement of architecture for students;
- SOA First Years, which serves as a liaison between first-year students and prospective applicants as well as general recruitment tool.

== Study abroad and other opportunities ==
SOA study abroad opportunities include:

- Study in Italy, a semester at the Santa Chiara Study Center in Tuscany, approximately an hour from Florence. The program focuses on the study of design, history, and visual communication throughout Italy;
- Europe Program, a semester of study that emphasizes a broad experience covering the buildings, landscapes, and the urban fabric across Europe;
- Studio Mexico, a 4 to 5-week travel component during which participants visit pre-Columbian sites, 16th century churches, small villages, and contemporary architecture in Mexico;
- Sustainable Architecture and Design in Munich, a 6 to 9-week faculty-led summer program in Germany.

In addition, the Study Abroad Office at The University of Texas at Austin offers faculty-led programs and facilitates exchanges with various foreign institutions.

Other opportunities for students include:

- The Professional Residency Program, which provides upper-level architecture students with the opportunity of a 6 to 7-month work experience as an intern in an office of the architectural profession;
- Design Build opportunities offer educational experiences where students design and construct architectural projects. For example, most recently, the school was involved with the United States Department of Energy 2015 Solar Decathlon;
- Summer Academy in Architecture, a community outreach program that introduces students to the architecture and design fields as a possible career. The program helps students develop drawing and model-building skills.

== Diversity initiatives ==
In 2016, SOA launched an initiative focused on Race, Gender, and the Built Environment in conjunction with the university's Division of Diversity and Community Engagement. The goal of the initiative is to facilitate diversity among design and planning professionals and students, and foster discourse in teaching and research on race, gender, and inequality in American cities. Anna Brand and Andrea Roberts were named the first two scholar-fellows for this program as part of a one-year appointment.

== Admissions ==
All undergraduate applications are evaluated with emphasis on the following areas: SAT or ACT scores, class rank, essays, academic preparation, extracurricular activities, and other achievements. Out of approximately 1,000 freshman applicants, 95 students are admitted. External transfer admission is offered to a few qualified applicants each year. Portfolios are not accepted from freshman applicants.

Graduate programs accept applications only for the fall semester. Applicants to all graduate degree programs are evaluated on The University of Texas requirements for graduate admissions. Most admitted graduate students have at least a 3.0 GPA in their higher-level college work.

== Program rankings ==
In 2012, SOA's undergraduate Architecture Program was ranked second in the nation according to DesignIntelligence. The graduate Architecture Program was eleventh, and the Community and Regional Planning Program was fifteenth.

In 2013, DesignIntelligence ranked the undergraduate Architecture Program sixth; the graduate Architecture Program eleventh; the undergraduate Interior Design Program sixth; and the graduate Landscape Architecture Program thirteenth.

In 2014, SOA's graduate Architecture Program was ranked #10. In the Dean's Survey, the undergraduate Architecture Program was ranked fourth and the undergraduate Interior Design Program was tied for fifth.

Rankings were recently updated for 2017, with SOA placing in the top 10 for its undergraduate Architecture Program at #6.

Rankings by Niche ranked the program 11th in the nation for 2018.

== Notable current faculty ==
- Anthony Alofsin
- Michael Benedikt
- Coleman Coker
- David Heymann
- Juan Miró
- Steven Moore
- Lawrence Speck

== Notable former faculty ==
- Samuel E. Gideon
- Natalie de Blois
- Nancy Kwallek
- Charles Moore
- Enrique Norten
- Frederick R. Steiner
- Friedrich St. Florian
- Billie Tsien

During the 1950s, former SOA dean Harwell Hamilton Harris recruited several architects who practiced in the Bauhaus style of Josef Albers as faculty members. Known as the Texas Rangers (architects), these faculty included Bernhard Hoesli, Colin Rowe, John Hejduk, Robert Slutzky, Lee Hodgden, John Shaw, and Werner Seligmann.

== Notable alumni ==
- Howard Barr
- John S. Chase
- Everett Fly
- Craig Dykers and Elaine Molinar of Snøhetta
- David Lake of Lake|Flato
- Fernando Belaúnde Terry, former president of Peru
