= Sam Fox School of Design & Visual Arts =

Art school of Washington University in St. Louis

Coordinates: 38°38′49″N 90°18′10″W

Sam Fox School of Design and Visual Arts
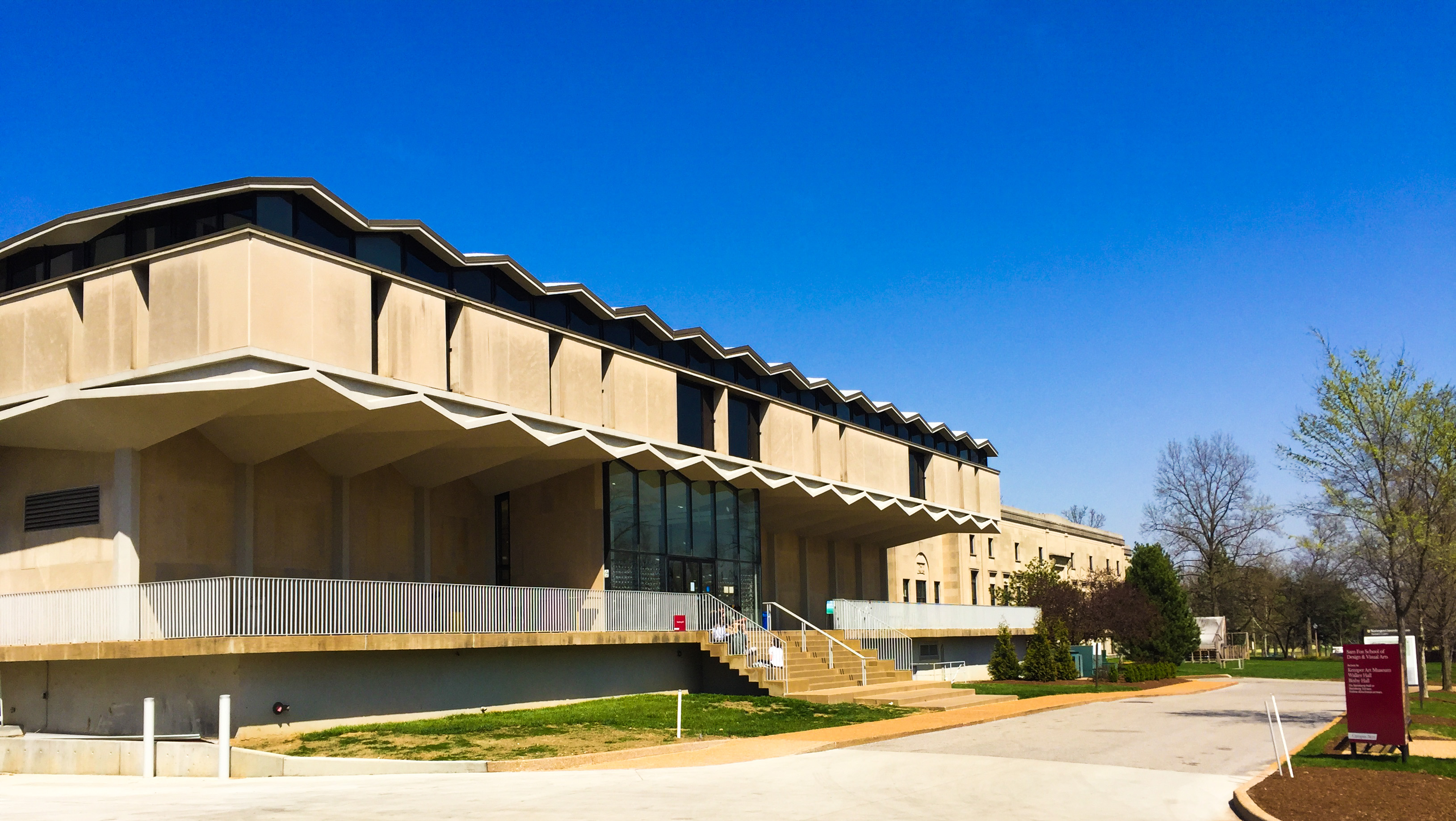
- Steinberg Hall, a part of Sam Fox School of Design and Visual Arts, April 2018
- Washington University in St. Louis; St. Louis, Missouri

Information
- School type: Art, Design, Architecture
- Established: 2006
- Dean: Charlie White
- National ranking: 2nd in Best Colleges for Design 3rd in Best Colleges for Architecture 13 in Best Colleges for Art
- Website: http://samfoxschool.washu.edu/

The Sam Fox School of Design & Visual Arts is a part of Washington University in St. Louis. The Sam Fox School was founded in 2006 by uniting the academic units of Architecture and Art with the university's Mildred Lane Kemper Art Museum. It is dedicated in honor of donor, former United States Ambassador to Belgium, and owner of Harbour Group Industries, Sam Fox. The school comprises

- College of Architecture
- Graduate School of Architecture & Urban Design
- College of Art
- Graduate School of Art
- Mildred Lane Kemper Art Museum

Carmon Colangelo was the inaugural Ralph J. Nagel Dean of the Sam Fox School of Design & Visual Arts. The deanship was established in 2016 with a $5 million gift from Washington University Trustees and alumni Ralph Nagel and his wife Trish Nagel. Charlie White is the current Ralph J. Nagel Dean as of July 2026.

== Architecture ==
The Department of Architecture was first established as part of the School of Engineering and Architecture in 1902. Its first head was architect Frederick M. Mann (1868–1959), who served as director from 1902 through 1910, when the school became an independent division of the university. The School of Architecture received a dedicated building, Givens Hall, in 1930.

Architect Fumihiko Maki taught at the school as assistant professor for four years beginning in 1956. His first commission was Steinberg Hall, completed in 1960. Maki won the Pritzker Prize in 1993.

Buckminster Fuller taught at the school, and encountered the visiting professor Frei Otto there in 1958. George Anselevicius became a full professor in 1962, and dean of the college from 1968 through 1973. British architect Stephen Gardiner taught at the school in 1978.

Weil Hall, named for Anabeth and John Weil, was completed in 2019 as part of the university's East End Transformation, and contains graduate level studio spaces in addition to a digital fabrication lab.

As of 2026, Niche ranked the School of Architecture #2 in Best Colleges for Design, and #3 in Best Colleges for Architecture.

The School of Architecture offers BS and BA degrees at the undergraduate level, as well as the following graduate-level degrees: Master of Architecture, Master of Landscape Architecture, Master of Urban Design, Master of Science in Advanced Architectural Design, and Master of Science in Architectural Studies. At the graduate level, the school also offers dual degree programs between architecture, landscape architecture, and urban design, as well as joint degree programs in business, social work, public health, or construction management.

Aki Ishida is the Director of the College of Architecture and the Graduate School of Architecture & Urban Design and the Sam and Marilyn Fox Professor. She succeeded Heather Woofter in 2024.

== Art ==
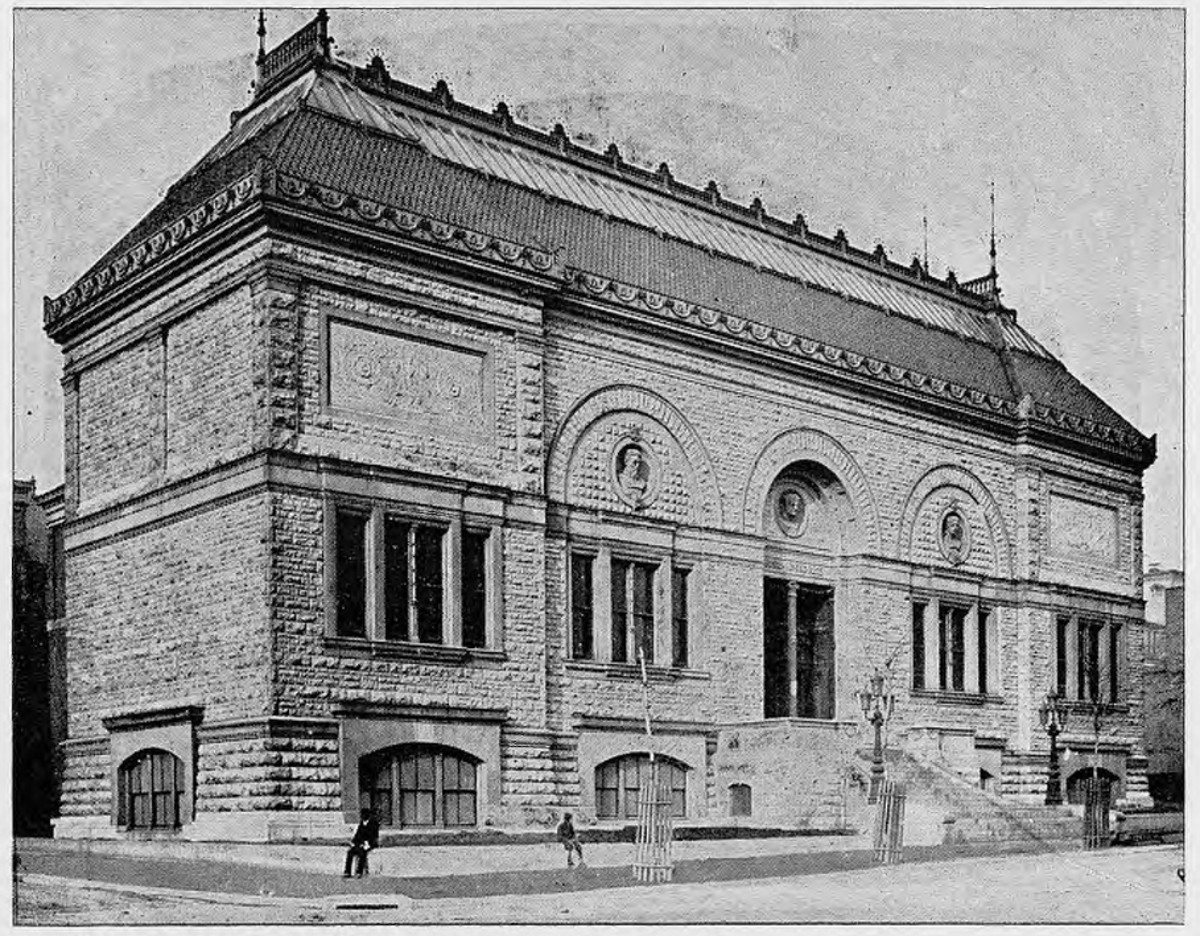
1879 Peabody and Stearns building, home of the art school 1879–1905 (razed 1919)

The St. Louis School of Fine Arts was founded as the Saint Louis School and Museum of Fine Arts in 1879 as part of Washington University in St. Louis, and has continuously offered visual arts and sculpture education since. Its purpose-built building stood in downtown St. Louis on Lucas Place.

After about 25 years of operation, in 1909, a legal conflict over funding split the organization into two parts: the school and its art collection, which remained part of privately held Washington University, and a public civic art museum, which became the Saint Louis Art Museum. The art school and the university's art collection moved to the university campus in 1909. With minor changes of name and location, it continued independently until 2006.

At the undergraduate level, Art offers the BFA degrees in Studio Art, Communication Design, and Fashion Design, and BA degrees in Studio Art and Design. At the graduate level, students can pursue a Master of Fine Arts in Visual Art, a Master of Fine Arts in Illustration & Visual Culture, or a Master of Design for Human-Computer Interaction and Emerging Technology.

Meghan Kirkwood is the Director of the College and Graduate School of Art. She succeeded Amy Hauft in 2026.

== Mildred Lane Kemper Art Museum ==
The Mildred Lane Kemper Art Museum, named such in 2004, also dates back to the 1879 founding. Its collection was formed in large part by acquiring significant works by artists of the time, a legacy that continues today. The Museum contains 19th-, 20th-, and 21st-century European and American paintings, sculptures, prints, installations, and photographs.

Sabine Eckmann is the William T. Kemper Director and Chief Curator of the Mildred Lane Kemper Art Museum.
