= Steven A. Moore =

American architect

Steven A. Moore is the Bartlett Cocke Regents Professor Emeritus in Architecture at the University of Texas at Austin School of Architecture. Moore received his undergraduate degree in Architecture from Syracuse University (1967) after which he practiced in Iran, Boston and in Maine as a Principal of Moore/Weinrich Architects (1971–90). He was a Loeb Fellow at the Harvard Graduate School of Design in 1990-91 and received his Ph.D. from Texas A&M University in 1996. At The University of Texas he has taught design and courses related to the philosophy, history, and application of sustainable technology. His specialization is in the use of methods derived from science and technology studies (STS) to study the built environment.

In 1999, Moore was appointed Director of UTSOA’s Sustainable Design Program. He went on to co-found the UT Center for Sustainable Development (CSD) in 2002. In 2009, Moore received an Individual Scholar Award from the U.S. National Science Foundation, and in 2015 he was a finalist for the Thomas Ehrlich Civically Engaged Faculty Award, which is given annually by the Association of American Colleges and Universities (AAC&U). In 2016, he began the transition from full-time teaching to research and activism. He is the author of many articles, over 25 book chapters and 7 books on the topic of sustainable architecture, urbanism, and theory.

== Recent Books ==
- Technology and Place: Sustainable Architecture and the Blueprint Farm (2001)
- Sustainable Architectures: Natures and Cultures in Europe and North America, co-edited with Simon Guy (2005)
- Philosophy of Design: From Engineering to Architecture, Co-edited with Peter Kroes, Andrew Light, and Pieter Vermass (2007)
- Alternative Routes to the Sustainable City: Austin, Curitiba and Frankfurt (2007)
- Pragmatic Sustainability: Theoretical and Practical Tools. Editor. 1st edition London:Routledge (2010).
- with Barbara B. Wilson. Questioning Judgment in Architecture: The Problem of Codes in the United States. London and New York, Routledge (2013).
- Pragmatic Sustainability: Dispositions for Critical Adaptation. Editor. 2nd edition. New York: Routledge (2016).
