= Heather Woofter =

American architect

Heather Woofter is an American architect. She is the dean of the University of Texas at Austin School of Architecture. She was formerly the director of the College of Architecture and Graduate School of Architecture & Urban Design at Washington University in St. Louis.

== Biography ==
Woofter was raised in Maryland and Massachusetts. She attended Virginia Tech where she received her Bachelor of Architecture degree and then earned a Master of Architecture degree from Harvard University in 1998. After graduation, she worked at Bohlin Cywinski Jackson, Marks Barfield and Robert Luchetti Associates. In 2003, she co-founded Axi:Ome.

In 2010, Woofter became the program chair for the College of Architecture and Graduate School of Architecture & Urban Design for the Sam Fox School of Design & Visual Arts at Washington University in St. Louis, later becoming the college's director in 2017.

In 2023, she became the dean of the University of Texas at Austin School of Architecture.

== Bibliography ==
- 3 Stages Of Architectural Education (2013). South Korea: Damdi Press.
