= Nancy Kwallek =

American architecture professor

- Education: Kent State University, University of Oregon, Purdue University
- Occupation: Professor at the University of Texas School of Architecture

Dr. Nancy Kwallek is a professor emeritus at the University of Texas School of Architecture (UTSOA). She held the Gene Edward Mikeska Endowed Chair in Interior Design, and was the Director of UTSOA’s Interior Design Program. She received her B.S. from Kent State University; M.S. from University of Oregon, and her Ph.D. from Purdue University. Her areas of interest include: interiors and society; interior design history and theory; and the effects of interior environments (specifically, ambiance of color) on individuals.

According to Laura Stack, author of "The Exhaustion Cure: Up Your Energy from Low to Go in 21 Days," Kwallek's studies on ambient color theory are cited frequently throughout past and present research on the effects of interior environments.

Some of Kwallek's studies include:

- Kwallek, N., Lewis, C.M., and Robbins, A.S. (1988). "Effects of office interior color on workers' mood and productivity." Perceptual and Motor Skills. Vol. 66, (pp. 123–128)
- Kwallek, N. and Lewis, C.M. (Dec. 1990). "Effects of environmental colour on males and females: A red or white or green office." Applied Ergonomics. Vol. 21, No. 4, (pp. 275–278).
- Kwallek, N. (1996). "Office wall color: An assessment of spaciousness and preference." Perceptual and Motor Skills. Vol. 83, (pp. 49–50).
- Kwallek, N., Lewis, C.M., and Soon, K. (April 2007) "Work week productivity, visual complexity, and individual environmental sensitivity in three offices of different color interiors." Color Research & Application. Vol. 32, No. 2, (pp. 130–143).

In September 2011, Kwallek was featured as a lecturer for the VAC Talks series, as part of the Visual Arts Center at the University of Texas at Austin College of Fine Arts. Her lecture was in conjunction with artist Mika Tajima's exhibition, "The Architect’s Garden." In the lecture, Kwallek referenced Herman Miller and Knoll as primary examples of how the impact of color can affect individual senses. She detailed how the designs of Alexander Girard and Florence Knoll helped to set the stage for change in interior color palettes. For example, Kwallek spoke about the era prior to Girard's designs, when most interiors focused on aesthetically basic, functional textiles or patterned, floral textiles. Kwallek indicated that Girard opted to instead inject vibrancy into interior design through the use of primary colors, playful geometric shapes, and humor. She also credits architect and Knoll designer Eero Saarinen as an important contributor to burgeoning color variation in midcentury design.

Kwallek delivered a textiles symposium on UT Austin campus called, “Weaving the Past and the Present," which celebrated 101 years of interior design education at the university.

== Sources ==
- The Alcalde (January, 2000). Vol. 88, No. 3, (p. 15).
- Stack, Laura (2008). The Exhaustion Cure: Up Your Energy from Low to Go in 21 Days. Random House Digital, (p. 236).
- VAC Talks. "Dr. Nancy Kwallek discusses Herman Miller, Inc. and Knoll's color palettes from the 1950s." Available online: http://vimeo.com/39782884
