= History of the University of Texas at Austin =

The University of Texas at Austin was originally conceived in 1827 under an article in the Constitución de Coahuila y Texas to open a public university in the state of Texas. The Constitution of 1876 also called for the creation of "The University of Texas” By the late 1990s, the university had the largest enrollment in the country and contained many of the country's top programs in the areas of law, architecture, film, engineering, and business.

== Establishment ==
After Texas gained independence, its Congress adopted a constitution which included provisions for establishing public education. President Mirabeau B. Lamar emphasized the importance of education in democracy during his first speech to the Texas Congress. Ezekiel Cullen later presented a bill proposing to set aside twenty leagues of land for a university, which was eventually increased to fifty leagues by Congress. They also reserved 40 acres in Austin for a university campus, serving as the origin of the colloquial term "Forty Acres".

On April 18, 1838, "An Act to Establish the University of Texas" was referred to a special committee of the Texas Congress, but was not reported back for further action. On January 26, 1839, the Texas Congress agreed to set aside fifty leagues of land—approximately 288,000 acres (117,000 ha)—towards the establishment of a publicly funded university. In addition, 40 acres (16 ha) in the new capital of Austin were reserved and designated "College Hill", hence the colloquially term "Forty Acres" used to refer to the university.

After Texas was annexed, the Seventh Texas Legislature on February 11, 1858, passed O.B. 102, establishing the University of Texas and allocating $100,000 in United States bonds from the Compromise of 1850 for its construction. Additionally, land reserved for railroad development was designated to support the university's endowment. On January 31, 1860, wanting to avoid raising taxes, the legislature authorized the funds for the University of Texas.

Article 7, Section 11 of the 1876 Constitution established the Permanent University Fund (PUF), a sovereign wealth fund managed by the Board of Regents of the University of Texas, dedicated to the university's maintenance. To address concerns about excessive spending on academic buildings, Article 7, Section 14 prohibited using state general revenue for university construction, requiring funds for buildings to come from the university's endowment or private gifts.

Texas's secession from the Union and the American Civil War delayed repayment of the borrowed monies. At the end of the Civil War in 1865, the University of Texas's endowment was just over $16,000 in warrants and nothing substantive had been done to organize the university's operations. This effort to establish a university was again mandated by Article 7, Section 10 of the Texas Constitution of 1876 which directed the legislature to "establish, organize and provide for the maintenance, support and direction of a university of the first class, to be located by a vote of the people of this State, and styled 'The University of Texas.'"

After the Civil War, the Texas Constitution of 1876 required the state to establish the university promptly and specified that it should be a "university of the first class." This constitution repealed the railroad land endowment from the Act of 1858 but allocated one million acres of land in West Texas for the university. In 1883, an additional two million acres of land were granted, with the proceeds from land sales or grazing rights designated for The University of Texas. The Texas Constitution also mandated that the university include departments for agriculture, mechanics, pharmaceuticals, and engineering in later years.

On April 10, 1883, the legislature supplemented the Permanent University Fund with another 1,000,000 acres (400,000 ha) of land in west Texas granted to the Texas and Pacific Railroad but returned to the state as seemingly too worthless to even survey. The legislature additionally appropriated $256,272.57 to repay the funds taken from the university in 1860 to pay for frontier defense and for transfers to the state's General Fund in 1861 and 1862. The 1883 grant of land increased the land in the Permanent University Fund to almost 2.2 million acres. Under the Act of 1858, the university was entitled to just over 1,000 acres (400 ha) of land for every mile of railroad built in the state. Had the 1876 Constitution not revoked the original 1858 grant of land, by 1883, the university lands would have totaled 3.2 million acres; the 1883 grant was thus to restore lands taken from the university by the 1876 Constitution, not an act of munificence.

On March 30, 1881, the legislature set forth the university's structure and organization and called for an election to establish its location. By popular election on September 6, 1881, Austin (with 30,913 votes) was chosen as the site. Galveston, having come second in the election (with 20,741 votes), was designated the location of the medical department (Houston was third with 12,586 votes). On November 17, 1882, on the original "College Hill", an official ceremony commemorated the laying of the cornerstone of the Old Main building. University President Ashbel Smith, presiding over the ceremony, prophetically proclaimed "Texas holds embedded in its earth rocks and minerals which now lie idle because unknown, resources of incalculable industrial utility, of wealth and power. Smite the earth, smite the rocks with the rod of knowledge and fountains of unstinted wealth will gush forth." The University of Texas officially opened its doors on September 15, 1883.

== 19th century ==
UT's early leadership included Confederate veterans like President Leslie Waggener, Regent George Washington Littlefield, and regent George Washington Brackenridge, a Union sympathizer. In 1890, Brackenridge donated $18,000 for the construction of a three-story brick mess hall known as Brackenridge Hall (affectionately known as "B.Hall"), one of the university's most storied buildings and one that played an important place in university life until its demolition in 1952.

In 1881, Austin was chosen as the site of the "Main University," and Galveston was designated the location of the "Medical Department." In addition, the legislature authorized a governing board of eight regents. An official ceremony began construction on what is now referred to as the Old Main Building in late 1882 on the original "College Hill." The university finally opened its doors on September 15, 1883.

The old Victorian-Gothic Main Building served as the central point of the campus's 40-acre (160,000 m^{2}) site, and was used for nearly all purposes. Built in three stages by architect F. E. Ruffini, the first was completed in 1883 for the university's first class; subsequent construction saw the creation of the central section in 1891 and the east wing in 1899. However, by the 1930s, discussions arose about the need for new library space, and the Main Building was razed in 1934 to much protest. The modern-day tower and Main Building were constructed in its place.

In 1894, the Department of Engineering was established at the University of Texas, marking the foundation of what would later become the College of Engineering.

== 20th century ==
The campus was geographically divided by gender, with women's dorms north of the Forty Acres and men's dormitories southeast of the Main Building. In 1903, the Woman's Building became the first women's dormitory at UT Austin, featuring modern amenities like an elevator, gym, swimming pool, infirmary, and spacious living areas. In contrast, male students resided in dorms with limited common areas, barracks-style sleeping arrangements, with only one dormitory offering air conditioning. Female students in early UT dormitories required permission to leave for activities other than classes; male visitors were restricted to certain areas and used phone banks to contact women upstairs.

In 1910, George Washington Brackenridge donated 500 acres (2 km²), located on the Colorado River, to the university. A vote by the regents to move the campus was met with outrage. As a result, in 1921, the legislature appropriated $1,350,000 for the purchase of land adjacent to the main campus. Expansion, however, was hampered by the constitutional restriction against funding the construction of buildings. With the discovery of oil on university-owned grounds in 1923, the institution was able to put its new wealth towards its general endowment fund. These savings allowed the passing of amendments to make way for bond issues in 1931 and 1947, with the latter expansion necessary from the spike in enrollment following World War II. Temporary frame buildings were hastily constructed during this period, and the university built 19 permanent structures between 1950 and 1965.

In 1912, the University of Texas at Austin began offering business classes as part of the College of Arts and Sciences. Over the next decade, the department experienced rapid growth and by April 1922, department chair Spurgeon Bell received news that UT President Robert Vinson intended to propose the creation of a separate School of Business Administration to the Board of Regents. The regents approved this proposal at their meeting in July of the same year, and Bell was appointed as the school's inaugural dean.

In 1916, Texas Governor James E. Ferguson clashed with the University of Texas when he sought to remove faculty members the board of regents refused to dismiss. Ferguson responded by vetoing the university's funding, threatening its closure. This led to his impeachment by the Texas House of Representatives, subsequent conviction by the Senate on charges of misusing public funds, and his removal from office by the Texas Senate.

=== World War I ===
The United States' entry into World War I on April 6, 1917, had an immediate impact on campus life at the University of Texas at Austin. During World War I, the university hosted an Air Service training school and aviation cadets received essential ground training at UT Austin before proceeding to the Camp John Dick Aviation Concentration Camp in Dallas for further assignment. During the war, over 1,000 students enlisted and at least 75 former students were killed and as male students enlisted in the armed forces, college enrollments declined sharply. Approximately 40 professors took temporary leaves to serve in government roles. Concurrently, research efforts on campus shifted towards supporting the war effort, particularly in psychology, biology, and chemistry.

Campus life saw military influence, with students in uniform adhering to a strict daily schedule that combined academic studies and military training. Sentries were stationed at university buildings, and professors were required to show proper identification to access their offices and classrooms.

In 1919, the Littlefield Fountain was commissioned as a World War I memorial and installed in 1932. Sculpted by Pompeo Coppini, the structure consisted of a bronze ship's prow representing the "Boat of America," accompanied by allegorical figures including Columbia, the Army, and the Navy, set against a backdrop of sea-horses and merman figures.

The DKR Texas Memorial Stadium was constructed in 1924 as a tribute to Texans who served during World War I. In 1977, the stadium was rededicated as a memorial honoring all individuals who have served in wars.

=== World War II ===
During the Second World War, numerous students, faculty, and alumni left to participate in the war effort. Additionally, to facilitate the wartime effort, academic calendars were compressed, allowing for accelerated graduation Among these defense researchers, 22 university scientists contributed to the Manhattan Project. The creation of a Naval ROTC unit transitioned into the V-12 program, headquartered at the Littlefield Home, and mandatory physical education classes and survival training were implemented for all students. After the war, students and faculty returned to school. One notable alumnus, Frank Denius, served in the Marines and being a part of the D-Day invasion and returned to UT afterwards.

=== Post-War ===
In 1965, the Texas Legislature granted the university Board of Regents to use eminent domain to purchase additional properties surrounding the original 40 acres (160,000 m^{2}). In the Spring of 1965, the university began buying individual parcels of land to the north, south, and east of the existing campus, particularly in the Blackland neighborhood, in hopes of using the land to relocate the university's intramural fields, baseball field, tennis courts, and parking lots. The University Board of Regents focused on expansion eastward, as the east side's lower property values would lower the cost of acquisition. During the talks of annexation, the university and the City of Austin referred to Blackland neighborhood as the "Winn Tract" (named after an elementary school in the area), the "University East Project", or the Eastern Renewal Area". They had originally planned to annex all the land between I-35 and Chicon Street. However, following 12 years of negotiations, the Blackland Community Development Corporation (CDC) and the university reached a compromise, which allowed the annexation of the land between I-35 and Leona Street to build the Red and Charline McCombs Field and other auxiliary buildings; meanwhile, the university divested all of its previously acquired property east of Leona Street back to the Blackland CDC.

=== 1966 Shooting ===
On August 1, 1966, Charles Whitman barricaded himself on the observation deck of the tower of the Main Building with a sniper rifle and various other weapons, killed 14 people on campus, and wounded many more, before being shot and killed by police. Prior to the massacre, he killed his mother and his wife. Following the Whitman incident, the observation deck was closed until 1968, and then closed again in 1975 following a series of suicide jumps during the 1970s. In 1998, after installation of security and safety precautions, the tower observation deck reopened to the public.

Completed in 1969, the two-building Jester Center was completed. At the time, it was the largest residence hall in North America and was the largest building project in university history. The residence hall saw the first instance of opposite sex dorm rooms combined on the dorm.

During the Vietnam War, thousands of student protesters marched along Guadalupe Street toward the Texas State Capitol as part of the ongoing anti-war movement following the Kent State shootings. Though the protest was mostly peaceful, police were reported to have sometimes used clubs and fired tear gas.

The first presidential library on a university campus was dedicated on May 22, 1971 with former President Johnson, Lady Bird Johnson and then-President Richard Nixon in attendance. Constructed on the eastern side of the main campus, the Lyndon Baines Johnson Library and Museum is one of thirteen presidential libraries administered by the National Archives and Records Administration.

University President Bryce Jordan appointed a library planning committee, and by April 1972, the Board of Regents approved the committee's recommendation of the facility. In 1977, Perry–Castañeda Library (PCL) was opened to the public, named for two former University professors, Ervin S. Perry and Carlos E. Castañeda. In 1972, Bellmont Hall was constructed as an 11-level building providing facilities for Intercollegiate Athletics, physical education, and various recreational activities.

== 21st century ==
In the 2000s, the university experienced a wave of new construction. On April 30, 2006, the school opened a new 155,000-square-foot (14,400 m^{2}) facility named the Blanton Museum of Art. The museum, the largest university art museum in the United States, is home to more than 17,000 works from Europe, the United States and Latin America.

During the early 2000s, students actively protested against the Iraq War, utilizing social media, organizing rallies, demonstrations, and discussions on campus to express opposition to the U.S. government's decision to engage in military action in Iraq.

In August 2008, the AT&T Executive Education and Conference Center opened for conferences, seminars and continuing education and executive-education programs. The hotel and conference center are part of a new gateway to the university extending the South Mall. Later the same month, after three years of renovations were completed, Darrell K Royal–Texas Memorial Stadium became the largest stadium (by seating capacity) in the state of Texas. In addition to numerous improvements, DKR now seated 100,119, up from the previous 94,113.

In 2008, demolition of the old Experimental Sciences Building (ESB) was completed and construction began on a replacement to be named the Norman Hackerman Building (NHB) in honor and memory of Dr. Norman Hackerman, chemist, professor and president emeritus.

In September 2010, a shooting occurred at the Perry–Castañeda Library (PCL) where student Colton Tooley, armed with an AK-47, fired shots on his walk from Guadalupe Street to the library's front entrance. The student ascended to the sixth floor, before killing himself.

On January 19, 2011, the university announced the creation of a 24-hour television network in partnership with ESPN, dubbed the Longhorn Network. ESPN agreed to pay a $300 million guaranteed rights fee over 20 years to the university and to IMG College, the school's multimedia rights partner. The network covers the university's intercollegiate athletics, music, cultural arts, and academics programs. The channel first aired in September 2011.

The university implemented a "campus carry" law on August 1, 2016, allowing licensed gun owners to carry concealed handguns on campus premises, making UT Austin one of the public universities in Texas to permit concealed carry on campus. This policy generated significant debate and protests among students, faculty, and staff regarding safety concerns and the impact on academic environments.

Following the law, multiple anti-gun rallies occurred. At the beginning of the fall 2016 semester, hundreds of students staged an anti-gun rally on campus, where they displayed sex toys to highlight their opposition to allowing concealed handguns in classrooms and dorms. The protest, known as "Cocks Not Glocks", aimed to draw attention to what participants viewed as absurdity in allowing deadly weapons on campus while imposing strict rules on free sexual expression. A later lawsuit filed by three professors was dismissed and the U.S. Court of Appeals for the 5th Circuit uphold the lower court's dismissal of the lawsuit under the 2nd Amendment.

After an ensuing manhunt, Austin police announced on April 8, 2016, that 17-year-old Meechaiel Criner, a homeless youth, was arrested and charged with first-degree murder of Haruka Weiser. Weiser, a first-year dance and theater major, was last seen alive on campus before her body was found near a creek. Criner's arrest followed crucial tips provided by firefighters and witnesses, leading to his booking on charges of tampering with evidence and murder. The murder prompted questions about campus safety and mourning for Weiser throughout the student body, and marked the first homicide on the university's main campus in over 40 years.

In November 2016, students participated in protests against Donald Trump's election as the 45th president of the United States. The students marched through Austin, expressing opposition to Trump's policies and rhetoric. Students chanted slogans advocating for diversity and democracy, while also displaying signs criticizing Trump as racist and homophobic. The protest was part of widespread demonstrations across the country expressing opposition to Trump's presidency.

, prompting campus officials to emphasize safety measures. Following Weiser's death, UT President Gregory Fenves expressed condolences and pledged to enhance campus security."

In April 2017, an assault took place outside Gregory Gymnasium where a student, Kendrex White, attacked passersby with a Bowie knife. Three students were injured by White, while a fourth, Harrison Brown, was killed in the attack. White was taken into custody without incident. The incident prompted discussions about campus safety and mental health support, leading to enhanced security measures across the university campus.

Four Confederate statues were removed from its main campus overnight in August 2017. This action was taken in response to heightened concerns and public debate about Confederate monuments following the violent white supremacist rally in Charlottesville, Virginia. The statues removed included those of Robert E. Lee, Albert Sidney Johnston, John Reagan, and James Stephen Hogg.

In July 2019, a tuition-free college program, the Texas Advance Commitment, was launched, supported by a $160 million endowment to cover tuition and fees for low-income and middle-income students. The Texas Advance Commitment aimed to make higher education more accessible and affordable for thousands of undergraduates annually starting Fall 2020.

In December 2019, students initiated a protest movement in response to the return to teaching of two professors, Coleman Hutchison and Sahotra Sarkar, who had been disciplined for sexual misconduct violations including asking students to pose for nude photos and inappropriate remarks to graduate students. The protest involved student actions such as sit-ins, storming classes, and circulating petitions. Students were concerned about not being informed of their professors' misconduct histories and questioned the university allowing the professors to resume teaching. In response, the university formed a campus group to review policies and increase transparency by considering requests to publish information about faculty misconduct.

=== COVID-19 ===
In early 2020, following a major outbreak of the new coronavirus, the University of Texas at Austin restricted travel to Wuhan province in China, banning students studying abroad from traveling there in line with the U.S. Department of State's recommendation. During the COVID-19 pandemic, UT Austin scientists, including researchers from the molecular biosciences department, collaborated with the National Institutes of Health in January 2020 to develop key components of COVID-19 vaccines.

During the 2020 spring break, hundreds of University of Texas at Austin students traveled to Cabo San Lucas, Mexico, resulting in 49 confirmed cases of the novel coronavirus upon their return. After an initial cancellation of Friday, March 13, then-UT President Gregory L. Fenves announced on March 17, 2020, that all classes would transition to online for the rest of the spring semester in response to the escalating situation. By summer, the number of cases had reached over 400 and the university had reported its first death, a custodial worker.

As the fall 2020 semester commenced, the majority of courses transitioned to online formats, while 19% adopted hybrid models combining virtual and in-person elements. The widespread adoption of remote conferencing platforms like Zoom became essential for various university activities, accumulating over 1.2 million hours of usage within just 16 days into the semester.

On August 6, 2020, the University of Texas at Austin announced comprehensive measures to combat the spread of COVID-19 on its campus. With 472 reported cases among students, faculty, and staff, the university initiated plans to provide all students with free coronavirus tests and conduct 5,000 asymptomatic tests weekly.

In December 2020, UT celebrated the one-year anniversary of vaccine distribution in Austin, marking a milestone in the university's efforts to combat the pandemic.

Towards the start of the spring 2021 semester, the university urged undergraduate students not to return to campus until nearly two weeks after the semester's official start on January 19. As a precautionary measure, nearly all classes were conducted online throughout January, with only pharmacy and nursing courses exempted from the transition to online instruction.

In early 2021, a severe winter storm prompted the closure of both in-person and online classes, as well as campus events. Widespread power outages plagued the Austin area, affecting over 212,600 customers, including many within the University of Texas at Austin community.

Due to the pandemic, graduation ceremonies across the nation, including those at the University of Texas, faced postponements and cancellations. In 2020, the University of Texas at Austin postponed its in-person commencement ceremonies for the Class of 2020 due to the COVID-19 pandemic. Graduates waited 16 months for the official graduation ceremony, which finally took place in 2021 at the Darrell K Royal-Texas Memorial Stadium.

In anticipation of the fall 2021 semester, UT Austin planned for a return to in-person classes and campus activities, mirroring a broader trend across Texas universities. Despite facing limitations on implementing comprehensive safety measures, UT Austin adapted its strategies with testing requirements, vaccination incentives, and voluntary mask-wearing campaigns to promote campus safe.

=== Post COVID-19 ===
In 2021, UT Austin leaders worked with Dan Patrick, Lieutenant General of Texas, and private donors to set up a Liberty Institute at the university. In 2022, Patrick said that the Liberty Institute was created to restrict teaching about critical race theory. Patrick's remarks sparked concerns about academic freedom and freedom of thought on campus.

In Fall 2022, the University of Texas at Austin introduced a new gender-inclusive housing option called the "Family and Friend Expanded Roommate Option", allowing students to select roommates regardless of gender identity or sexual orientation. The program was developed in response to student feedback and advocacy for gender-inclusive housing options.

In January 2023, the University of Texas at Austin implemented a policy to block access to TikTok on its IT network, aligning with Governor Greg Abbott's directive to ban the app from state-managed electronic resources due to concerns about data security and ties to the Chinese government. This decision was part of a broader trend seen across various universities and state governments in the U.S.

In early 2023, a winter storm caused class closure across the campus and prolonged power outages. Fallen tree branches were found across campus as a result of the ice formation during the storm.

In November 2023, controversy arose when two teaching assistants, Parham Daghighi and Callie Kennedy, were dismissed following a message they sent to students expressing support for Palestinians, in the context of the outbreak of the Gaza war. Dean Allan Cole of the School of Social Work argued that their message was unprompted, unrelated to the course, and lacked approval from a supervising faculty member, and thus served as grounds for termination.

On December 8, 2023, a group of students at the University of Texas at Austin engaged in a peaceful protest following the termination of the two teaching assistants. Afterwards, students involved in the protest faced disciplinary action from the university, including restrictions on contacting the dean and his administrative staff, reflective writing assignments, and suspension if they violated any other university policies. The university defended its actions, stating that the protest crossed the line of acceptable behavior and disrupted university operations.

In March 2024, after four years of test-optional admissions for undergraduate applications due to the COVID-19 pandemic, standardized testing scores were once again made a mandatory part of admissions, beginning with applications for the Fall 2025 semester. Jay Hartzell commented that the SAT and ACT standardized exams were "a proven differentiator that is in each student's and the University's best interest."

On April 2, 2024, the University of Texas at Austin announced significant adjustments in compliance with Senate Bill 17, which went into effect in January 2024, banning diversity, equity, and inclusion (DEI) initiatives in public universities. The decision was accompanied by the layoff of an estimated 60 individuals associated with DEI, according to joint statements from the Texas NAACP and the Texas Conference of American Association of University Professors. In compliance with Senate Bill 17, the center announced the elimination of all training and workshops pertaining to race, sexual orientation, and gender identity.

The termination of these employees sparked criticism from UT students, advocacy groups, and Democratic lawmakers, with various student protests occurring on campus. Critics argued that the university's response represented an over-compliance with the anti-DEI law, and Brandelyn Franks Flunter, the director of the multicultural center, publicly announced her termination. Conversely, some conservative lawmakers celebrated the curtailment of DEI programs as a victory against what they termed as "woke" policies in higher education.

As Austin would see totality for the Solar eclipse of April 8, 2024, the University of Texas at Austin hosted a viewing event. Despite cloudy weather, thousands of students, faculty, and visitors gathered across campus at designated "Sun Spots" to witness the rare astronomical event. Festivities included music performances, snacks, and the distribution of eclipse glasses and telescopes. According to the university, before the 2024 eclipse, the last path of totality that included Austin was in 1397.

=== April 24th Protest ===
Riot Police separate protestors during the April 24th Protests. The Texas Capitol is in the background.

On April 24, 2024, hundreds of students participated in a walkout to protest the Gaza war and demand divestment from companies manufacturing machinery used in war. Texas state troopers in riot gear intervened to disperse the protesters, with assistance from the Austin Police Department in transporting arrested individuals, leading to more than 20 arrests primarily for trespassing. The protests came following a wave of similar actions at other universities across the United States.

Governor Greg Abbott supported this police action, stating that 'these protesters belong in jail' and calling for the expulsion of students engaged in 'antisemitic protests' at Texas public colleges and universities". Protesters alleged racism in their treatment by police. Critics alleged a violation of first amendment rights and saw no evidence of anti-semitism.

Towards the afternoon, the university issued a "Notice of Dispersal Order" to students following clashes and arrests on the campus. The email referenced violations of Penal Code Sections related to disorderly conduct, riot, and obstructing passageways.

The Council on American-Islamic Relations (CAIR) chapter in Austin, Texas, issued a statement condemning what they described as "unnecessary and excessive force" by law enforcement officers. Fayyaz Shah, board chair of CAIR Austin, emphasized the importance of law enforcement exercising restraint and respecting the rights of protesters. In the statement, Shah expressed concern over the use of a large number of heavily armed officers to arrest student activists peacefully protesting the Israel-Hamas war.
