= Burleson Bells =

Coordinates: 30°17′07″N 97°43′51″W

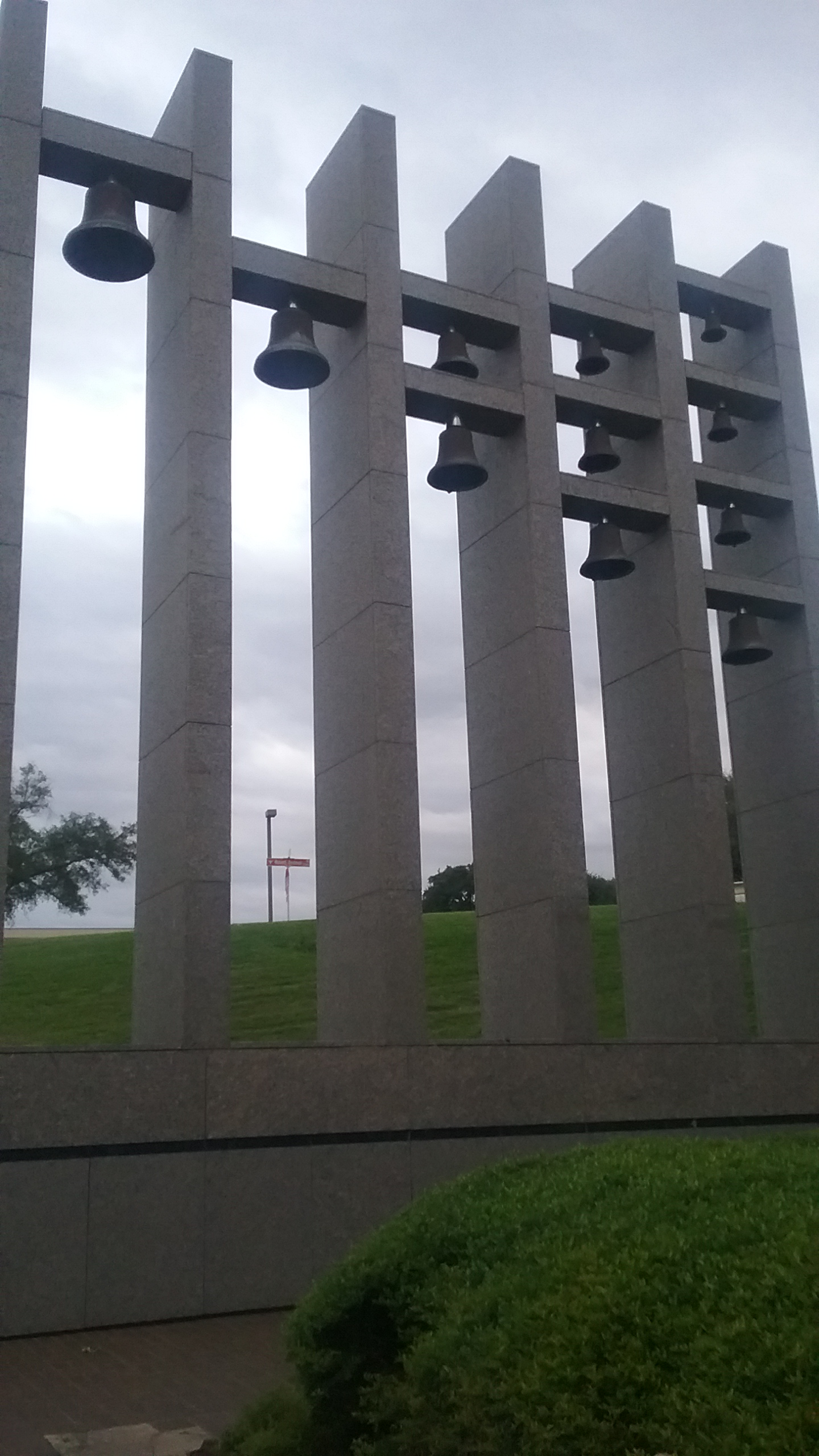
Burleson Bells at the University of Texas at Austin

The Burleson Bells at the University of Texas at Austin are located in a monument just outside the Bass Concert Hall in Austin, Texas. The Burleson bells were donated to the University of Texas at Austin as part of an anonymous gift by Albert Sidney Burleson, and were originally installed in the old Main Building in 1930. There they played "The Eyes of Texas," "Will You Come to the Bower," and "Dixie." When that building was demolished in 1934, the bells were retired to storage until they were installed at their present site in 1981. The electrical controls for the bells in their current site were originally located in the basement of Bass Concert Hall, but were lost during a major renovation of that building in 2009.
