= Main Building (University of Texas at Austin) =

Tower in the University of Texas in Austin, Texas, United States

UT Tower
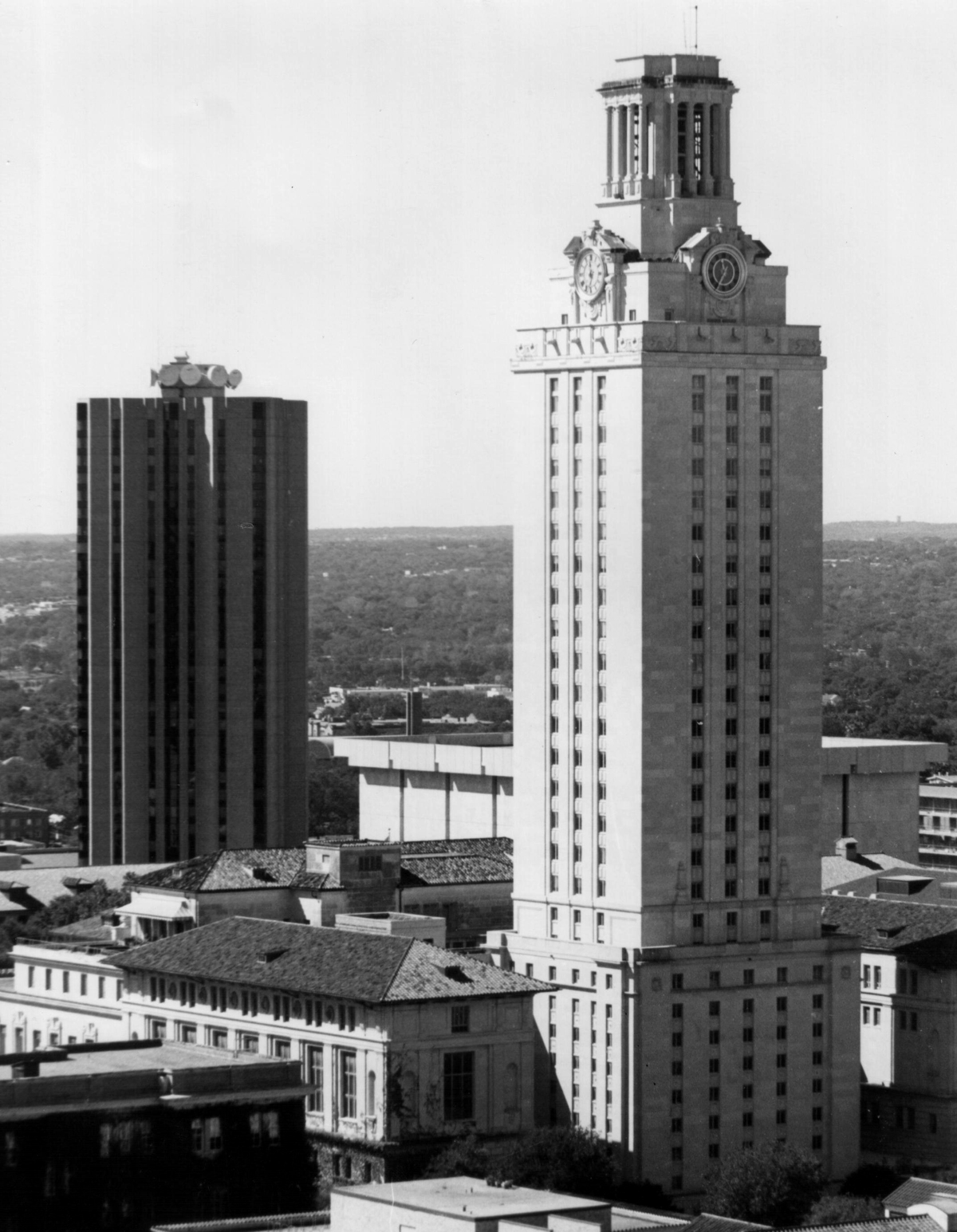
- The Main Building in the foreground, c. 1980

General information
- Architectural style: Beaux-Arts
- Location: 110 Inner Campus Drive, Austin, Texas; United States
- Coordinates: 30.2861°N 97.7393°W
- Construction started: 1934
- Completed: 1937

Height
- Roof: 307 ft (94 m)

Technical details
- Floor count: 27

Design and construction
- Architect: Paul Philippe Cret

The Main Building (known colloquially as The Tower) is a structure at the center of the University of Texas at Austin campus in Downtown Austin, Texas, United States. The Main Building's 307-foot (94 m) tower has 27 floors.

== History ==
=== 1882–1934 ===
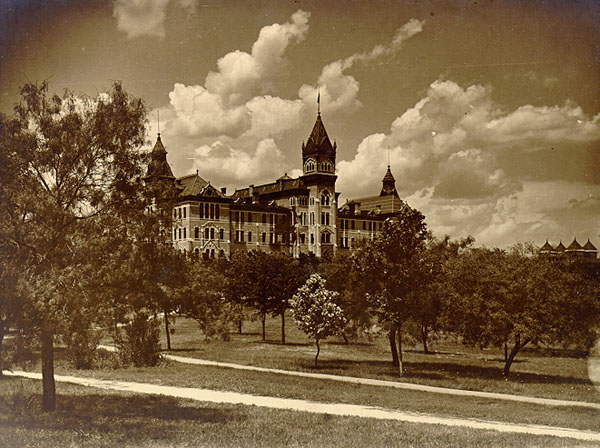
The university's Old Main Building in a 1903 photo.

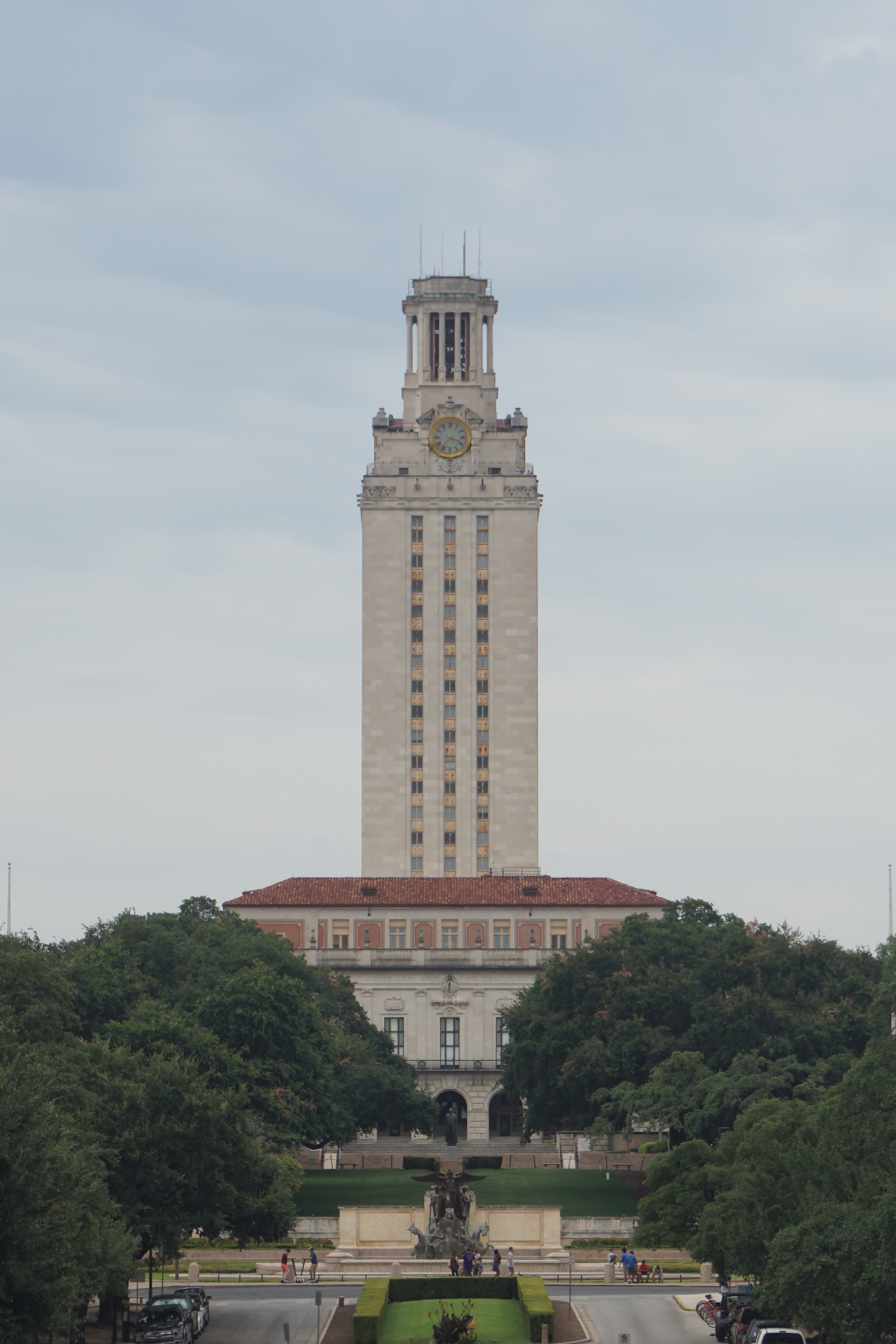
The Main Building in 2019

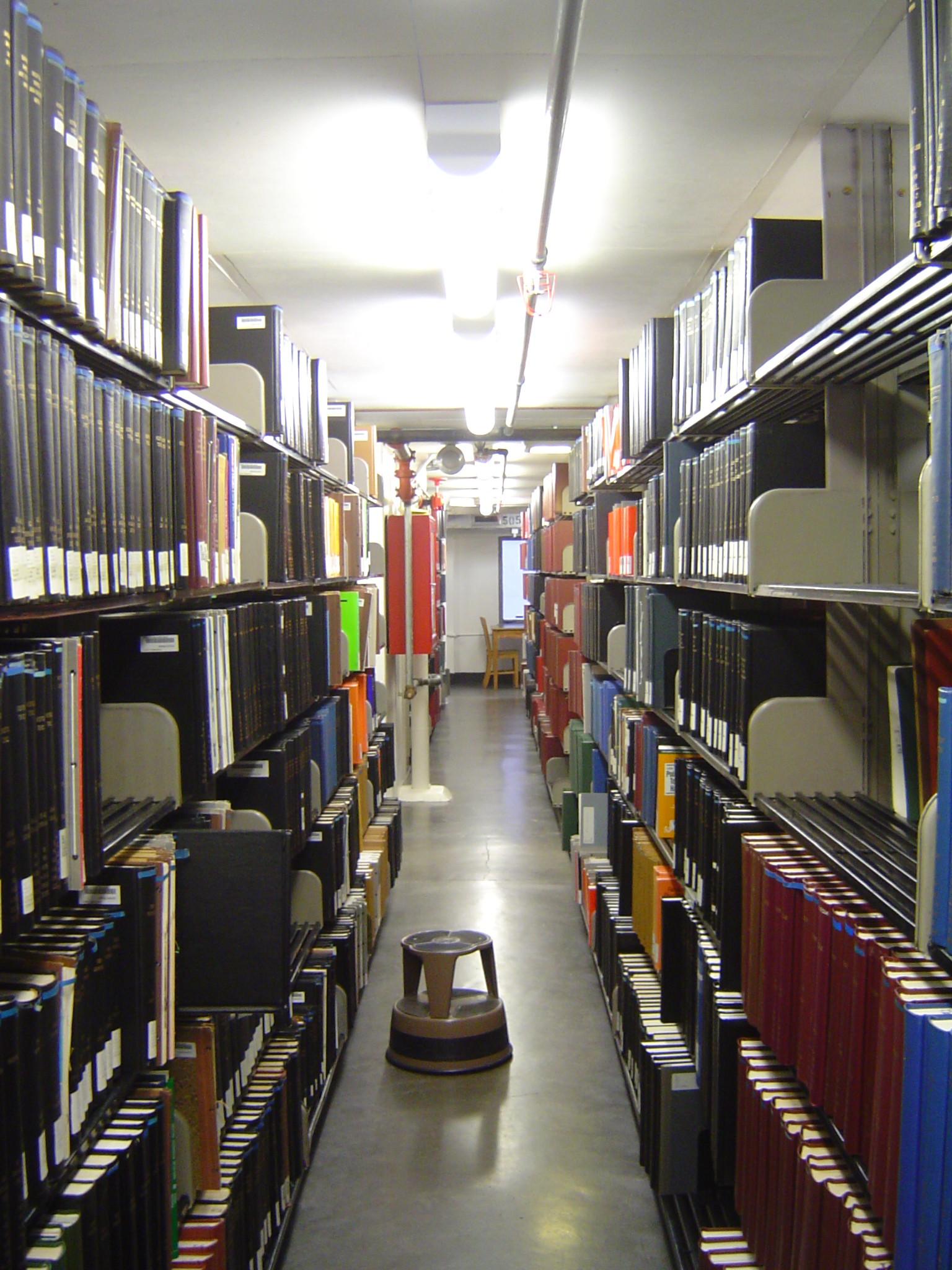
The crowded stacks at the Life Science Library.

The old Victorian-Gothic Main Building, designed by Frederick Ernst Ruffini and Abner Cook, served as the central point of the campus's forty-acre site, and was used for nearly all purposes beginning in 1882. However, by the 1930s, discussions arose about the need for new library space, and the Main Building was razed in 1934 over the objections of many students and faculty. All that remains of the Old Main Building are its old chime bells (called the Burleson Bells), which are now exhibited as part of a permanent display outside the university's Bass Concert Hall.

Texas architect Samuel E. Gideon salvaged the bricks and stained-glass windows from Old Main and integrated them into his Austin home, Pemberton Castle.

=== 1935–present ===
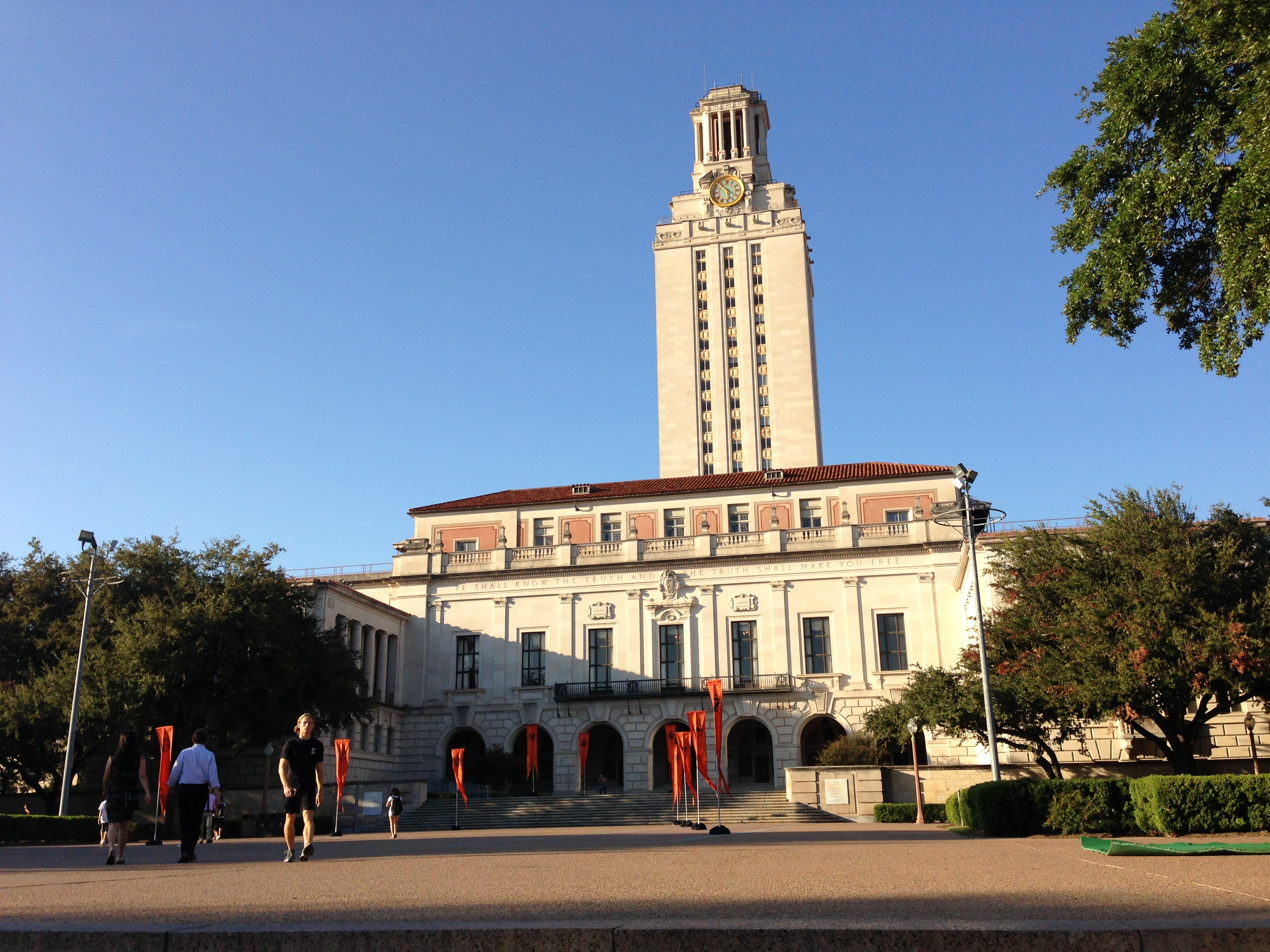
The present Main Building designed by Paul Philippe Cret.

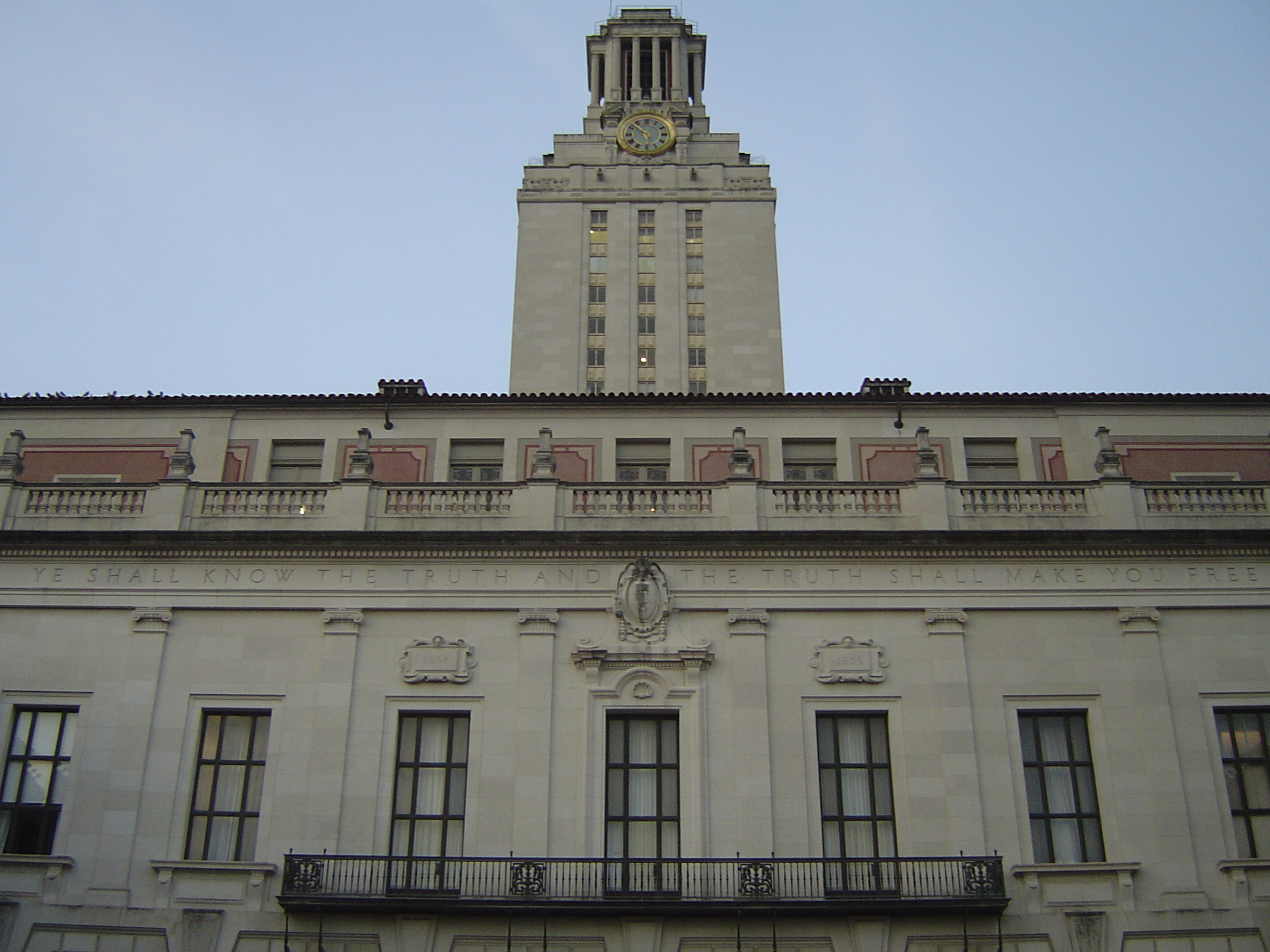
The facade of the Main Building. The inscription reads: "Ye shall know the Truth and the Truth shall make you free".

Originally, the university planned to use the Tower as a library space, using a dumbwaiter system to carry books from the upper floors to the students requesting them in the circulation room on a lower floor. Library employees were stationed on every other floor; students filled out paper book-request slips, which were sent upstairs by a pneumatic tube. The books were sent down to the students using an 18-story dumbwaiter. This proved ineffective, and the dumbwaiter is no longer used for that purpose. The building now mainly contains administrative offices, though it does still house a three-floor life sciences library and the Miriam Lutcher Stark Library of early and significant editions of English Romanticist works.

Two separate sets of elevators serve the building; one in the front, one in back. In the floors above the stacks and below a few top-floor offices, several floors contain the university herbarium (Plant Resources Center). United States census data are compiled and analyzed on some of these floors. Lastly, two secure elevators provide access to all 27 floors of the Tower while an elevator on the 27th floor provides access to the 28th-floor Observation Deck. There is also a book elevator in the stacks that serves floors 2 through 17.

The 307-foot (94 m) tower was designed by Paul Philippe Cret. Completed in 1937, the Main Building is located in the middle of campus. At the top of the Tower is a carillon of 56 bells, the largest in Texas. The carillon is played daily.

During World War II, the university installed an air raid siren built by its chief communications engineer, Jack Maguire, atop of the Tower. As there was never an air attack on the city, this siren was only tested and never truly used. The decommissioned siren was superseded by four electronic sirens installed in early 2007.

==== 1966 massacre ====
On August 1, 1966, Charles Joseph Whitman, an architectural engineering student at the university, barricaded himself in the observation deck of the tower of the Main Building with a scoped Remington 700 deer rifle and various other weapons. In a 96-minute standoff, Whitman killed 14 people and wounded 32 more (including 1 who died 35 years later of his wounds). Two police officers and a deputized manager from the co-op from across the mall climbed to the top of the tower and shot Whitman to death.

The observation deck remained closed until June 1967.

==== Suicide site ====
The tower's observation deck was closed again in 1974 after nine suicide jumps.

On November 11, 1998, the Board of Regents of the UT system approved the recommendation of Student Association leaders and of then-president Larry Faulkner to reopen the Tower's observation deck to visitors. After the installation of security and safety measures, the observation deck reopened to the public in 1999.

The observation deck was closed following the September 11, 2001 attacks, and reopened in 2004 with added security.

==== Tower Girl ====
A female peregrine falcon nicknamed Tower Girl first attempted nesting on top of the tower in 2018. The University of Texas Biodiversity Center placed a webcam in order to monitor her, as a successful nesting attempt would expand the documented breeding range of the species in North America.

==== April 2024 protest ====
Police by the UT Tower prepare to apprehend protestors as onlookers watch.

On April 24, 2024, the UT Tower and lawn became a focal point for a peaceful demonstration over the Gaza war. Over 50 protesters were reportedly arrested during the demonstrations on campus where law enforcement officers, including those from the Texas Department of Public Safety, reportedly engaged in physical clashes with protesters, leading to tensions and calls for the release of those detained. The protests occurred amidst the ongoing nationwide demonstrations on college campuses.

The next day, on April 25, 2024, a crowd of around 500 demonstrators gathered, organized by groups such as the Texas State Employees Union and the American Association of University Professors in response to the events of the previous day.

=== Restoration ===
In Fall 2024 work on a $77 million dollar restoration project to restore all the facades on the tower began. The funds came from a mix of university and state funds and from private donations. The restoration efforts are 40% complete as of September 2026.

== Lighting ==
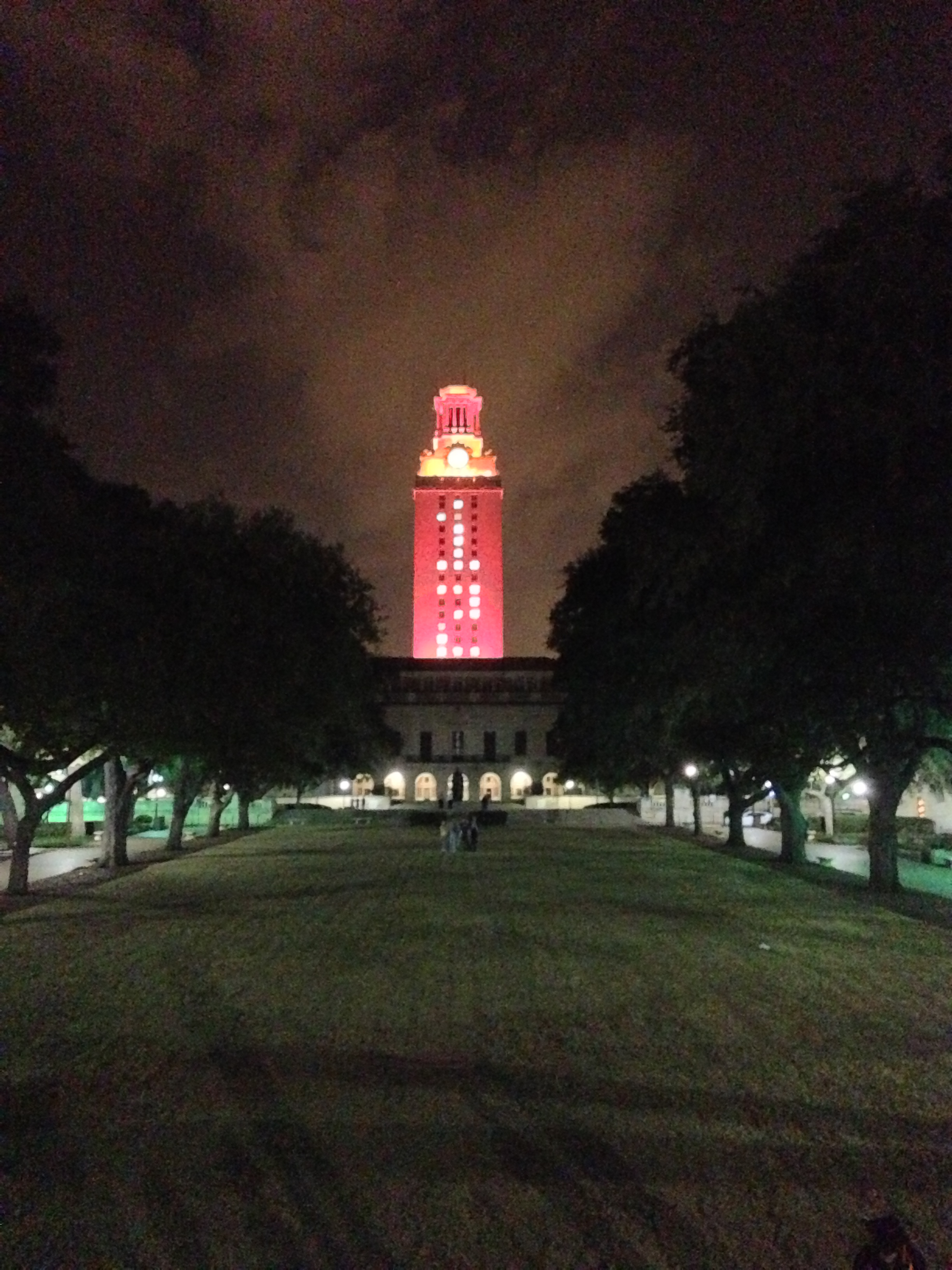
The tower of the Main Building illuminated orange for the 2012 Fall Commencement. The number 12 in lights refers to the graduating class of 2012.

Carl J. Eckhardt Jr., head of the Physical Plant in 1931, supervised the construction of the Main Building Tower. Eckhardt devised a lighting system to take advantage of its commanding architecture to announce university achievements. Beginning in 1937, orange lights were used to symbolize important events at the university; by 1947, standard guidelines for using the orange lights were created, and these have been updated since. There are currently different options for lighting, including a darkened tower to signify solemn occasions. An orange tower with office windows lit to form the numeral "1" is used for national championships in NCAA sporting events.

== See also ==
- History of the University of Texas at Austin
- List of carillons in the United States
