= Cocks Not Glocks =

American college student movement

Cocks Not Glocks is a university student movement that protested campus open carry laws, largely by distributing dildos to students to display on their backpacks. The movement was originally founded at the University of Texas at Austin in 2016, following the passage of Texas law that allowed for open carry on college campuses. The later spread to the University of Wisconsin—Madison.

== Origins ==
The movement grew out of a 2016 half-joking Facebook post by Jessica Jin, a University of Texas Austin student who argued that there were more regulations over sex toys in the college classroom than guns. From the initial post, the "Cocks not Glocks" mantra spiraled into a legitimate though satirical movement, drawing thousands of participants even though Jin herself did not have a history of campus organizing.

The Texas law was originally passed in 2015, and required universities to allow guns in most campus buildings (private universities could opt out of the policy). The law took effect on August 1, 2016. Upon returning to campus after summer break in 2016, the Cocks Not Clocks organization at the University of Texas at Austin distributed more than 4500 dildos to students.

== Slogans ==
Among the slogans used in the protests were "You're packin' heat, I'm packin' meat" and "take it and come" (a parody of "come and take it").
