= List of University of Texas at Austin buildings =

This list of University of Texas at Austin buildings catalogs the currently existing structures on the campus of The University of Texas at Austin in Austin, Texas. Buildings are categorized based on their current functions and characteristics.

== Academic facilities ==
Building	Image	Constructed	Notes	Reference
Art Building		1962	Located at the northeast corner of San Jacinto Blvd. and 23rd St., the building houses the Department of Art and Art History and the Visual Arts Center.	
Battle Hall		1911	Originally the main library, now houses the Architecture and Planning Library, the Alexander Architectural Archive and the Center for American Architecture. National Register of Historic Places listed. Cass Gilbert architect.	
Batts Hall		1953	"6 Pack" building	
Benedict Hall		1951	Located on the South Mall of the University of Texas at Austin campus, the five-floor, 38,580 square foot building is located along 21st Street, near Littlefield Fountain. Built in 1951 and named after mathematics professor and university president H. Y. Benedict, the building was completed in 1952 and was originally home to the Department of Mathematics. It has also been used for the psychology department. It is also a "6 Pack" building, the first of the "6-Pack" buildings to be built.	
Biological Laboratories		1923	Now houses Botany	
Biomedical Engineering Building		2008		
Burdine Hall		1970	Urban legend says the layout of the building's windows was intended to resemble a computer punched card.	
Calhoun Hall		1955	"6 Pack" building	
College of Business Administration Building		1962	(Formerly Business Administration-Economics Building), consists of two units: a seven-story office structure and a six-story classroom building; houses McCombs School of Business; part of the George Kozmetsky Center for Business Education complex.	
Connally Center		2000	Four story addition to Townes Hall that houses the Connally Center for the Administration of Justice, containing the Kraft W. Eidman Courtroom and the Texas Center for Public Policy Dispute Resolution. 3D/International, Inc. Architect.	
Peter T. Flawn Academic Center		1960	Student technology and collaboration facility. Also called the Main Building Annex, because of offices originally in the Main Building, but moved because of renovations.	
Engineering Teaching Center II		1983	Houses the Department of Mechanical Engineering	
Garrison Hall		1926		
Gary L. Thomas Energy Engineering Building		2022		
Gates-Dell Complex		2013	Consists of two buildings: the north building (Dell Computer Science Hall) and south building (unnamed). They are connected by an atrium and a series of collaboration bridges.	
G. B. Dealey Center for New Media		2012	Previously the Belo Center for New Media, the G.B. Dealey Center for New Media houses parts of the Moody College of Communication, including the facilities of KUT and KUTX	
Mary E. Gearing Hall		1933	Long known as the Home Economics Building	
Gebauer Building		1904	Dorothy L. Gebauer Building, formerly the student services building	
Goldsmith Hall		1932	Houses School of Architecture	
Graduate School of Business		1976	Home to McCombs School of Business graduate programs; part of the George Kozmetsky Center for Business Education complex.	
W. C. Hogg Building		1933		
Hogg Memorial Auditorium		1932		
Jesse H. Jones Hall		1980	Annex to Townes hall and the Tarlton Law library.	
Jones Communication Center			Houses parts of the Moody College of Communication, including the facilities of KLRU	
Liberal Arts Building		2012	Liberal Arts & ROTC	
Mezes Hall		1952	"6 Pack" building	
Moffett Molecular Biology Building		1997		
Neural and Molecular Science Building		2005		
Norman Hackerman Building		2007	Biology and Chemistry departments	
Nursing School				
Painter Hall		1932	Formerly the Physics Building	
Parlin Hall		1954	"6 Pack" building	
Perry–Castañeda Library		1974-1977	The main central library.	
Physics, Math, and Astronomy Building		1972	Houses the astronomy, mathematics, and physics departments	
Homer Rainey Hall		1956	"6 Pack" building, formerly "Old Music" Hall, last of the "6-Pack" buildings to be built	
Harry Ransom Humanities Research Center		1972	Acquires and manages collections of significant cultural materials such as rare books, manuscripts, film and art.	
Sid Richardson Hall		1971	Houses the Dolph Briscoe Center for American History, Barker Texas History Collections, Benson Latin American Collection, Lyndon B. Johnson School of Public Affairs, Public Affairs (Wasserman) Library, Teresa Lozano Long Institute of Latin American Studies (LLILAS) and RGK Center for Philanthropy and Community Service	
George I. Sanchez Building		1973	Houses the University of Texas College of Education, the Office of Bilingual Education, the Center for Science and Mathematics Education, and the Vaughn Gross Center for Reading and Language Arts.	
School of Social Work Building		1933	Old University Junior High School. National Register of Historic Places listed	
Sutton Hall		1917	Cass Gilbert architect	
University Teaching Center		1981-1984	Four-story general purpose classroom building; part of the George Kozmetsky Center for Business Education complex.	
Townes Hall		1953	The third and current home of the University of Texas School of Law and Tarlton Law Library.	
Waggener Hall		1931	Named after Leslie Waggener, first university president ad interim. Originally occupied by the school of business; now home to Department of Philosophy, Department of Classics, and Classics Library.	
Welch Hall		1929, 1958, & 1974	Chemistry	
West Mall Building		1962	Architecture, UTSOA Materials Lab	
W.R. Woolrich Laboratories		1958	Aerospace Engineering & Engineering Mechanics	

== Administrative buildings ==
Building	Image	Constructed	Notes	Reference
John W. Hargis Hall		1858	Houses the Undergraduate Admissions Center, is part of the "Little Campus," and is National Register of Historic Places listed.	Texas School for the Blind and Visually Impaired.
Main Building		1937	Houses the University's main administrative offices. Charles Whitman killed 13 people with a sniper rifle from the top of the tower in 1966.	
West Mall Office Building		1961		
Wooldridge Hall		1924	Demolished in 2010. Housed the International Office. Formerly it housed the School of Architecture design studios while Goldsmith Hall was being renovated in the mid to late 1980s. Originally it was the Wooldridge School, an Austin elementary school.	

== Athletic and outdoor recreation facilities ==
Building	Image	Opened	Notes	Reference
Darrell K Royal–Texas Memorial Stadium		1924	Originally Texas Memorial Stadium, the stadium was renamed in 1996 after Darrell K Royal, former football coach who led Texas to three national championships and eleven Southwest Conference titles.	
Frank Erwin Special Events Center		1977	Sometimes referred to as "The Drum" or "The Superdrum", owing to its drum-like exterior appearance, the facility is the home court for the UT men's and women's basketball programs. Demolished in 2023-2024 for expansion of Dell Medical School. Replaced by the Moody Center.	
Gregory Gymnasium		1930		
Lee and Joe Jamail Texas Swimming Center		1977		
Mike A. Myers Track & Soccer Stadium		1999		
Moody Center		2022	Home of the Texas Longhorns basketball programs	
Penick-Allison Tennis Center			Demolished in 2014 for the Dell Medical School. Replaced by the Texas Tennis Center.	
Recreational Sports Center		1990		
Red and Charline McCombs Field		1998		
Texas Rowing Center				
Texas Tennis Center		2018		
UFCU Disch-Falk Field		1975	The stadium is named for former Longhorns coaches Billy Disch and Bibb Falk. In 2006, the facility underwent a $21 million renovation and added UFCU to its name following sponsorship by local credit union University Federal Credit Union.	
Anna Hiss Gymnasium		1931	Originally the women's gymnasium. In 1994 the natatorium wing was demolished to make way for the Louise and James Robert Moffett Molecular Biology Building.	

== Museums ==
Building	Image	Constructed	Notes	Reference
Jack S. Blanton Museum of Art		2006	Art museum.	
Dolph Briscoe Center for American History		1971	Organized research unit and public service component of The University of Texas at Austin. Located in Sid Richardson Hall.	
Lyndon Baines Johnson Library and Museum		1971	Adjacent to the LBJ School of Public Affairs, the LBJ Library and Museum houses 40 million pages of historical documents, including the papers of Lyndon Baines Johnson and those of his close associates and others.	
Texas Science and Natural History Museum		1937	UT and Austin's Natural Science & Texas History museum. National Register of Historic Places listed.	

== Residential buildings ==
Building	Image	Constructed	Notes	Reference
Almetris Duren Residence Hall		2007		
Andrews Residence Hall		1936		
Blanton Residence Hall		1955		
Brackenridge Residence Hall		1933		
Carothers Residence Hall		1937	Carothers Hall was known as "Unit II" until March 1938 when it was renamed in honor of Asenath Carothers, who became the director of The Woman's Building on campus in 1903. In 1937, the hall was built with financial assistance from the Public Works Administration at a cost of $250,000 of which $72,000 was grants and the rest was paid for with loans. Paul Cret was consulting architect for the building and as a result it was made in Spanish Renaissance style with creamy tan bricks and red tile roof.	
Creekside Residence Hall		1955	Formerly Simkins Dormitory. The dormitory was named after William Stewart Simkins, who was a law professor and a Ku Klux Klan figure. In 2010, the university held a public hearing to discuss the possibility of renaming the building, and the name was changed to Creekside shortly thereafter. It is the last all-male dormitory operated by UT.	
Jester Center		1969	Named after former governor Beauford H. Jester, Jester Center includes two towers: a 14-level residence and a 10-level residence with a capacity of 3,200. When built, the complex, which occupies a full city block, was the largest residence hall in North America and was the largest building project in University history.	
Kinsolving Residence Hall		1958	Named after Rev. George Herbert Kinsolving, Kinsolving Residence Hall is an all-female dormitory on the north side of campus.	
Littlefield Residence Hall		1927	Littlefield Residence Hall is an all-female dormitory on the north side of campus.	
Moore-Hill Residence Hall		1939–1956	Moore-Hill houses a total of 390 residents in double rooms with community bath spaces. This 5 story coed dormitory houses males on the basement level and on the 1st and 3rd floors. Females live on the 2nd and 4th floors. The mascot of this dorm is the Moore-Hill Pirate. Moore-Hill dormitory was once two separate living halls, Hill Hall and Moore Hall. Hill Hall was named for Dr. Homer Barksdale Hill of Austin who volunteered to treat the UT Football team from the very first game in 1893 until his death on July 18, 1923. Dr. Hill received his MD from Tulane University and moved to Austin in 1889. Moore Hall was named in memory of Dean Victor Ivan Moore who served as the Dean of Student Life from 1927 until his death on August 6, 1943.	
Prather Residence Hall		1937		
Roberts Residence Hall		1936		
San Jacinto Residence Hall		2000		
Whitis Court Residence Hall		1953–1969		

=== University Apartments ===
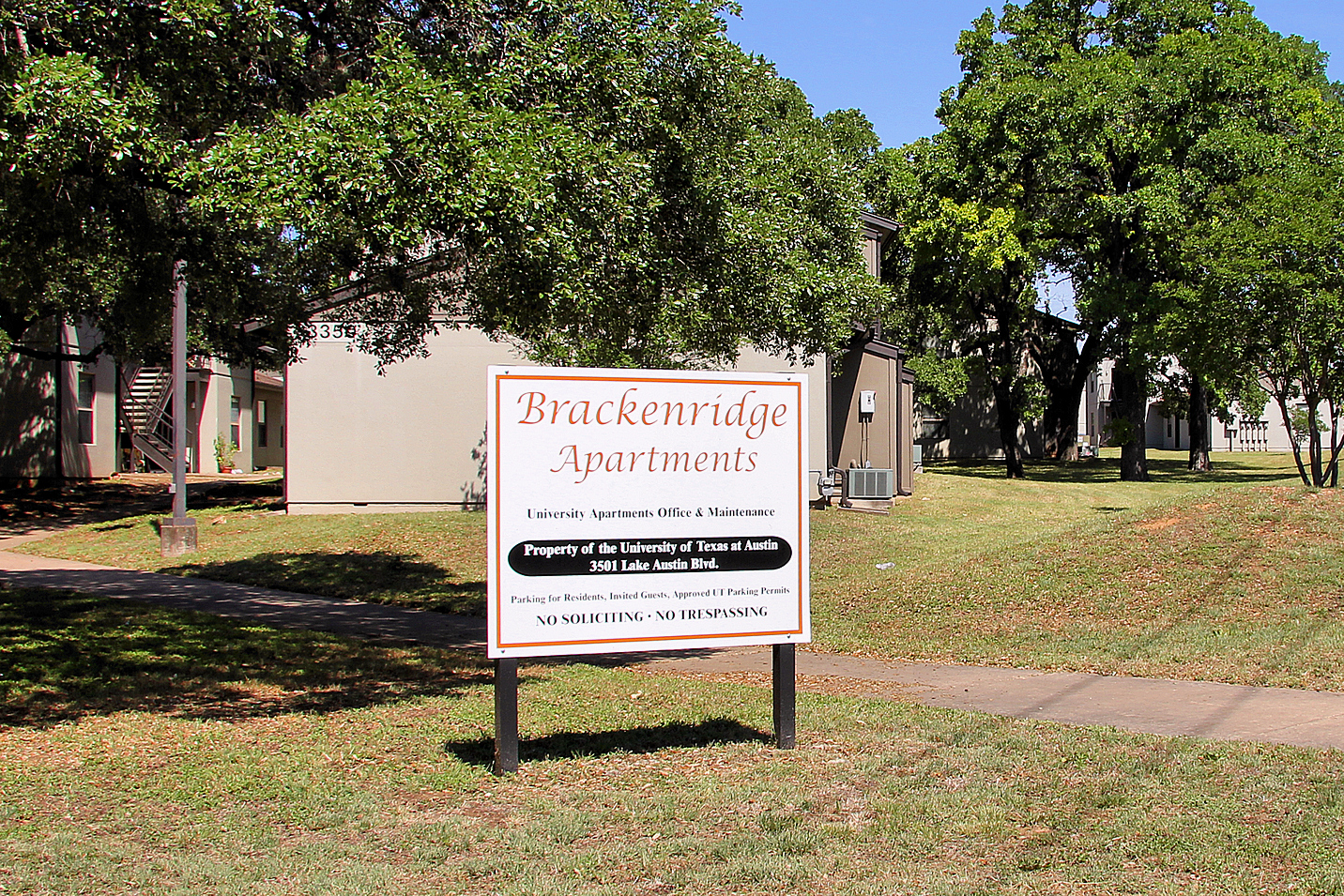
Brackenridge Apartments

There are also three off-campus apartment complexes owned and operated by the university. They are Brackenridge Apartments, Colorado Apartments, and Gateway Apartments. The apartments are about 6 miles (9.7 km) from the main UT Austin campus. Eligible students include graduate students and undergraduate students who each have at least 30 credit hours and are in good academic standing. Brackenridge apartments is Family Housing; Colorado and Gateway Apartments are assigned by the bedroom to UT Austin Students.

Brackenridge Apartments is a part of the 345-acre (140 ha) UT Austin Brackenridge tract, located along Lake Austin and Lady Bird Lake in western Austin. As of 2007 the units at Brackenridge Apartments do not have washers, dryers, and dishwashers. As of that year some units at Brackenridge do not have central air conditioning. As of that year the monthly rent for a three bedroom apartment was $715. The university provides shuttle buses to the UT Austin campus. At Brackenridge Apartments many neighbors know each other and area children interact with one another. Many residents originate from other countries. Brackenridge is .5 miles (0.80 km) away from Colorado Apartments.

Colorado Apartments has 510 units. The rent at Colorado, as of 2007, was half of the Austin apartment market rate. In 2007 540 students lived in the complex; about 70% come from outside of the United States. Of the spouses of the students, many are unable to work because their visas do not permit them to work.

The Colorado and Brackenridge units have painted concrete panel and brick exteriors, colored orange.

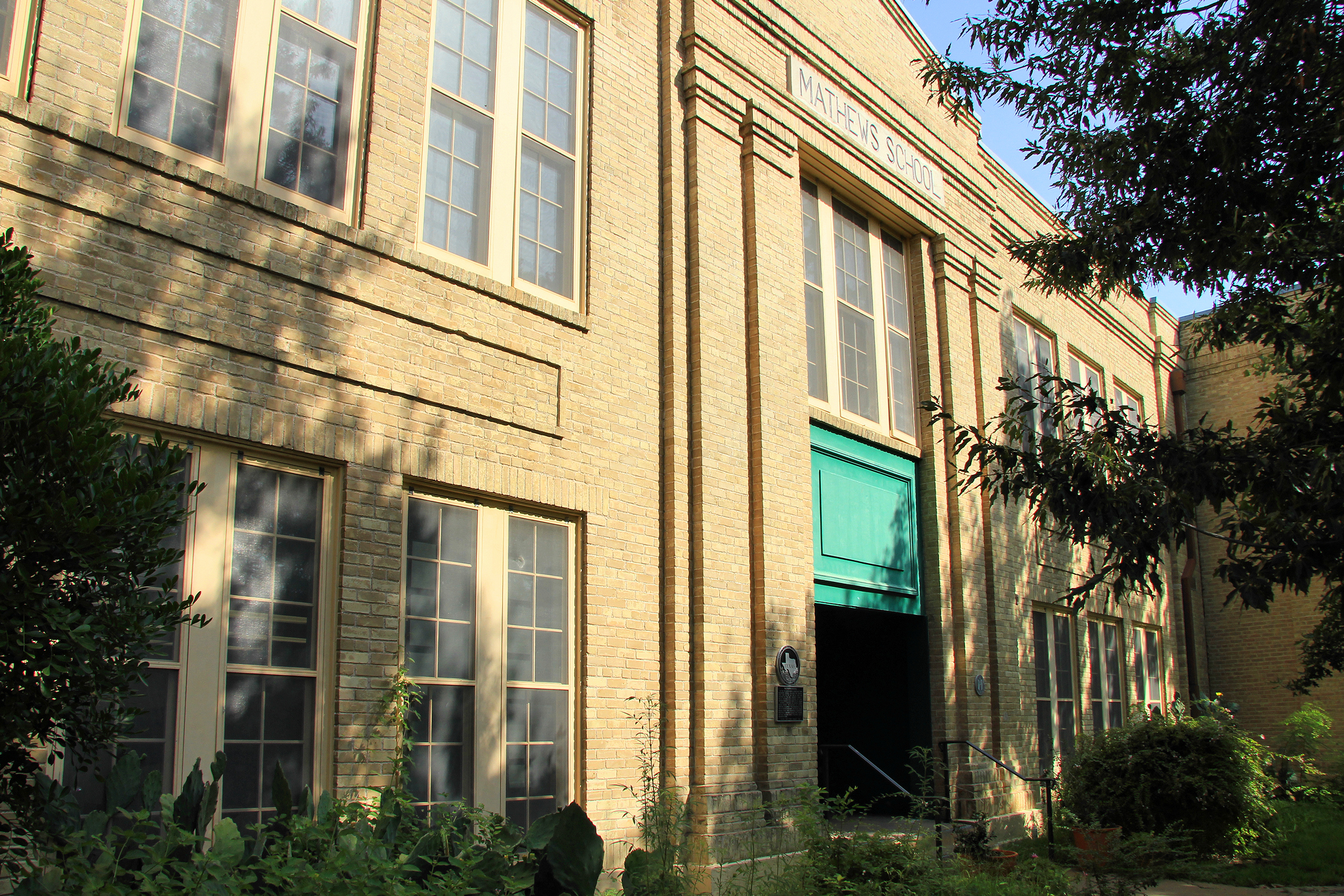
Many children living in the university apartments attend Mathews Elementary School

The Colorado Apartments area includes a gazebo, picnic tables, and a soccer (football) field. A grocery store is located in proximity to the complex.

All three apartments are within the Austin Independent School District and are zoned to Mathews Elementary School, O. Henry Middle School, and Austin High School. Many children of the UT Austin students living at Brackenridge and Colorado attend Mathews Elementary. School buses come to Brackenridge to pick up students to go to Mathews. The school is considered by the area community to be high achieving. Mathews has a racially/ethnically diverse student body. The school offers Chinese language classes. The school opened circa 1916.. In 2007 there were about 400 students, from over 40 countries, with 125 from the UT complexes.

==== History of university family apartments ====
The Colorado Apartments opened in 1962.

In 1989 the City of Austin and UT Austin entered into an agreement, allowing UT Austin the option of redeveloping the parcels of land housing the university family apartments. The agreement specifies that the parcels may be redeveloped to house residential, retail, and/or other commercial properties. The agreement regarding the parcel with the Colorado Apartments went into effect in 1999. The agreement regarding Brackenridge Apartments was scheduled to go into effect in 2009.

In 2005 the University of Texas Board of Regents offered the parcels of land with the Colorado Apartments as a possible site for the location of the George W. Bush Presidential Library; ultimately Southern Methodist University received the library. As of the northern hemisphere spring semester of 2007, 268 students were on a waiting list to get into units at Brackenridge Apartments. In August of that year, over 500 students submitted an intention to move into the units. Around 2007 a task force recommended selling the tract including the Brackenridge Apartments and the Colorado Apartments to developers, who would replace the apartments with commercial property. The options presented by the task force were keeping the housing at the same location, moving the housing to a new location, and giving a housing subsidy to students to pay for the costs of housing at third party locations. The graduate student community states that they preferred keeping the apartments where they were and did not support the housing subsidy idea. The community of Mathews Elementary believed that if the UT student housing was removed, the community would lose the international student culture that comes with the children who live on the complex.

When asked by the Austin American-Statesman. about the details of the recommendations of the planners to redevelop Gateway Apartments to be a larger complex and replacing the functions of Brackenridge and Colorado apartments, William Powers Jr., the UT Austin president, said that the components of the new housing plan that would be essential for the students would include having "garden-style" apartment units instead of high-rise dormitory units, having facilities for children, and continued zoning to Mathews Elementary.

== Other facilities ==
Building	Image	Constructed	Notes	Reference
Union Building		1933 & 1960	Texas Union Ballroom	
Littlefield House		1893	Historic residence donated to the University in 1935.	
AT&T Executive Education and Conference Center		2008	276 guest room and 21 suite hotel and conference center. Home to McCombs Executive Education courses.	
J. Frank Dobie House		1926	Former home of J. Frank Dobie. Houses the Michener Center for Writers	
Arno Nowotny Building		1857	Part of the Little Campus; houses the office of the director of the Briscoe Center	

== See also ==
- West Campus, Austin, Texas - This includes details of privately-operated, non-UT affiliated buildings which house University of Texas students, including the former Goodall-Wooten
