= Burdine =

Burdine is an American surname. It is also used as a feminine given name.

== People ==
=== Surnames ===
- Brigitte Burdine (1962–2010), American voice-casting director and actress.
- Greg Burdine (1959-2020), American politician
- Katherine Arden Burdine, American author
- Leo Burdine also spelled Birdene and Burdene, (1895–1960), American professional baseballl player
- Roddy Burdine (1886–1936), American businessman

== Fictional characters ==
=== First names ===
- Burdine Chong-Yu, a female supporting character in Spider-Man: The Animated Series
- Burdine Dresden, fictional mother of professional wizard, Harry Dresden, in fantasy TV series The Dresden Files
- Burdine Maxwell, a character on Bratz

=== Surnames ===
- Robyn Burdine, private investigator played by Jess Weixler in season 4 of CBS legal television drama, The Good Wife

== Other ==
- Burdine Hall, building at University of Texas at Austin, named for J. Alton Burdine, former dean
- Burdine, Kentucky, unincorporated community, United States
- Burdine Stadium, renamed to Miami Orange Bowl, the home stadium for the University of Miami Hurricanes football team, and named for Roddy Burdine
- Burdine Township, Texas County, Missouri, township named for Reuben Burdine.
- Burdines, a Florida department store chain, United States, founded by William and John Burdine
- Burdinne, a municipality in Belgium, in the province of Liège
- Verdell Burdine Rutherford Park, public park in Portland, Oregon, named for Verdell Burdine Rutherford
