= Union Building (University of Texas at Austin) =

Coordinates: 30.2867°N 97.7411°W

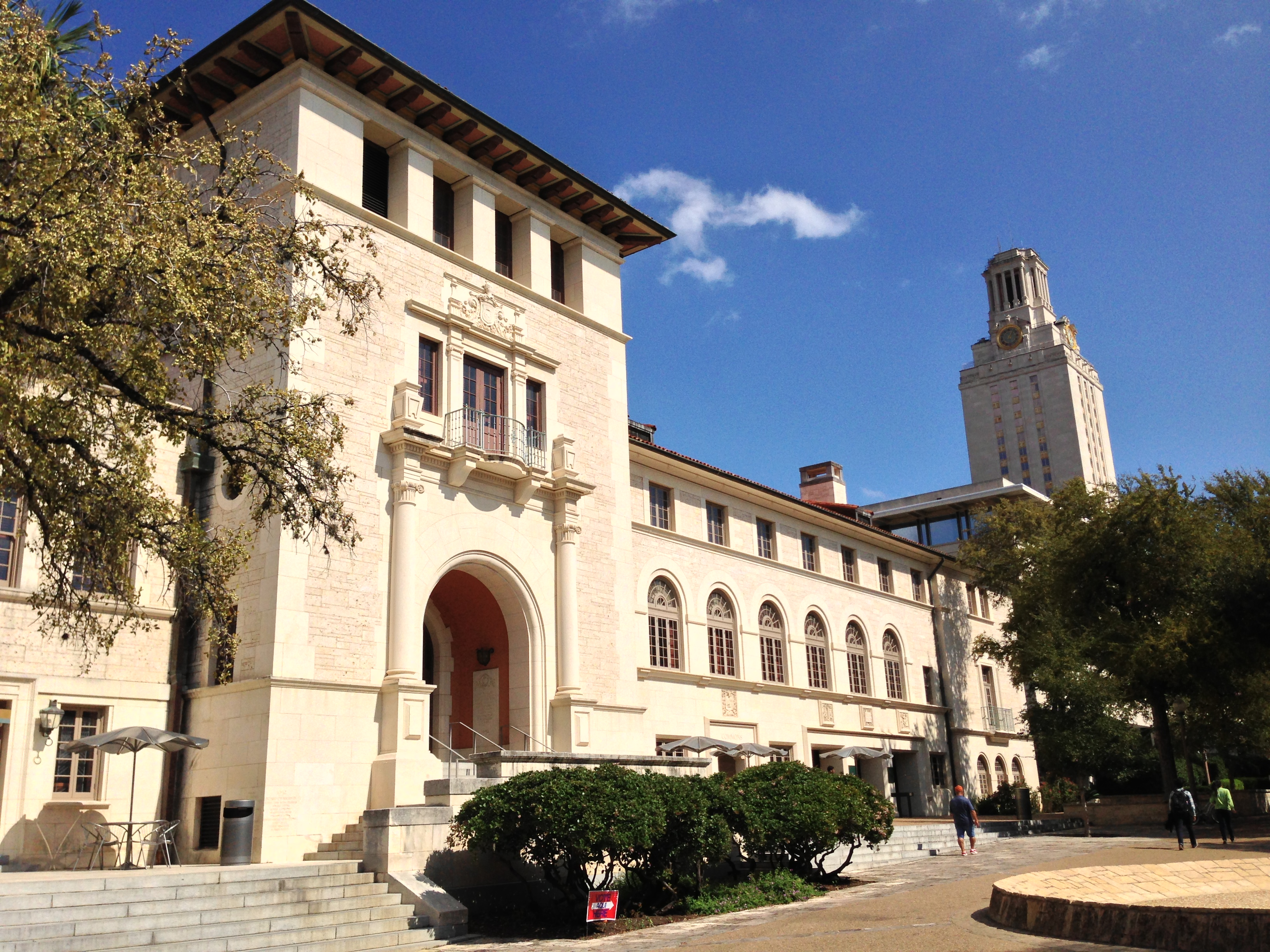
- Interactive map of the Union Building area
- Alternative names: Texas Union Building, Student Union Building

General information
- Location: 2308 Whitis Avenue, Austin, Texas, United States

Technical details
- Floor count: 5
- Floor area: 171,276 sq ft (15,912.1 m^{2})

Design and construction
- Architect: Paul Philippe Cret

Website
- universityunions.utexas.edu/visit/texas-union

The Union Building (also known the Texas Union Building or Student Union Building) is a building on the University of Texas at Austin campus, serving as a "college independent community center" or "living room" for students. Designed by Paul Cret, who also designed the Tower and Main Building, Goldsmith Hall and Texas Memorial Museum on the same campus, the Union was built in 1933 with funds provided by Texas Exes in a campaign led by Thomas Watt Gregory.

Once constructed, the Union was one of four buildings on campus intended for recreation and entertainment, the other three being Gregory Gymnasium for Men, the Women's Gymnasium and Hogg Memorial Auditorium. The building hosts a bowling alley and formal ballroom.

== History ==
In March 1930, Paul Cret was contracted to become the consulting architect for the University of Texas, followed by a second contact in June 1931 to design ten new buildings.

== Construction ==
The Union Building was constructed from smooth limestone and ashlar fossiliferous limestone. The building is staggered and asymmetrical, as opposed to "classically balanced" like Battle Hall, another building Cret designed for the campus.

== Cactus Café ==
The Cactus Café is a music venue and gathering place for students located in the Union Building, originally known as the Chuck Wagon when it opened in 1933. In January 2010, the university announced plans to close the Cactus, claiming that closing the venue would save the university $66,000 in its $2 billion annual budget. Concerned supporters formed the non-profit organization Friends of the Cactus Café with the purpose of raising funds to preserve the historic venue. An arrangement was eventually made to keep the venue open under the auspices and management of PBS radio station KUT.

== See also ==
- History of The University of Texas at Austin
- List of University of Texas at Austin buildings
