= St. Mary's Honor Center v. Hicks =

St. Mary's Honor Ctr. v. Hicks
- Supreme Court of the United States

Argued April 20, 1993 Decided June 25, 1993
- Full case name: St. Mary's Honor Center, et al. v. Melvin Hicks
- Citations: 509 U.S. 502 (more) 113 S. Ct. 2742; 125 L. Ed. 2d 407; 61 U.S.L.W. 4782; 62 Fair Empl. Prac. Cas. (BNA) 96; 61 Empl. Prac. Dec. (CCH) ¶ 42,322; 93 Cal. Daily Op. Service 4747; 93 Daily Journal DAR 8057; 7 Fla. L. Weekly Fed. S 553

Case history
- Prior: 970 F.2d 487 (8th Cir. 1992) (reversed and remanded)

Holding
- In a suit against an employer alleging intentional racial discrimination in violation of Title VII, trier of fact's rejection of employer's asserted reasons for its actions does not compel judgment for plaintiff.

Court membership
- Chief Justice William Rehnquist Associate Justices Byron White · Harry Blackmun; John P. Stevens · Sandra Day O'Connor; Antonin Scalia · Anthony Kennedy; David Souter · Clarence Thomas

Case opinions
- Majority: Scalia, joined by Rehnquist, O'Connor, Kennedy, Thomas
- Dissent: Souter, joined by White, Blackmun, Stevens

Laws applied
- Title VII of the Civil Rights Act of 1964

St. Mary's Honor Center v. Hicks, 509 U.S. 502 (1993), was a US labor law case before the United States Supreme Court on the burden of proof and the relevance of intent for race discrimination.

== Facts ==
Hicks, who was a black employee of St. Mary's Honor Center, a halfway house operated by the Missouri department of corrections and human resources, claimed race discrimination when he was demoted and discharged under the Civil Rights Act of 1964 §2000e-2(a)(1). He brought an action, in the United States District Court for the Eastern District of Missouri.

== Judgment ==
=== District Court ===
The District Court (Stephen N. Limbaugh Sr.), found that (1)(a) the employee had established a prima facie case of racial discrimination, and (b) the reasons that the employer gave for the demotion and discharge were not the real reasons for the demotion and discharge, but that (2) the employee had failed to carry his ultimate burden of proving that his race was the determining factor in the employer's allegedly discriminatory actions.

=== Court of Appeals, Eighth Circuit ===
The United States Court of Appeals for the Eighth Circuit reversed and remanded, holding that, once the employee had proved all of the employer's proffered reasons for the adverse employment actions to be pretextual, the employee was entitled to judgment as a matter of law.

=== Supreme Court ===
The Supreme Court held, five judges to four, that Hicks's case failed to discharge the burden of proof. For the majority, Justice Scalia held (joined by Rehnquist, O'Connor, Kennedy, and Thomas) that even if a plaintiff discredits an employer’s explanation, the employer can still win if the trier of fact concludes there was no discriminatory intent. The District Court's rejection of the employer's asserted reasons for its actions did not mandate a finding for the employee, because

(1) under Rule 301 of the Federal Rules of Evidence, a presumption did not shift the burden of proof;
(2) the Supreme Court had repeatedly stated that a Title VII plaintiff at all times bore the ultimate burden of persuasion;
(3) the Supreme Court had no authority to impose liability upon an employer for alleged discriminatory employment practices, unless an appropriate factfinder determined, according to proper procedures, that the employer had unlawfully discriminated;
(4) a holding that a finding for the employee as a matter of law was not mandated did not give special favor to employers whose evidence rebutting charges of racial discrimination was disbelieved;
(5) that an employer's proffered reason was unpersuasive, or even obviously contrived, did not necessarily establish that an employee's proffered reason of race was correct; and
(6) courts should not (a) treat discrimination differently from other ultimate questions of fact, or (b) make ultimate factual determinations on the basis of legal rules which were devised to govern the basic allocation of burdens and order of presentation of proof.

Justice Souter dissented (joined by White, Blackmun, and Stevens), arguing an employer would be better off presenting an untruthful explanation of its actions than presenting none at all. He would have held that in Title VII employment discrimination cases, proof of a prima facie case not only raised an inference of discrimination, but also, in the absence of further evidence, created a mandatory presumption in favor of the plaintiff. He said the majority's approach was "inexplicable in forgiving employers who present false evidence in court". He said the following:

The Court today decides to abandon the settled law that sets out this structure for trying disparate-treatment Title VII cases, only to adopt a scheme that will be unfair to plaintiffs, unworkable in practice, and inexplicable in forgiving employers who present false evidence in court. Under the majority's scheme, once the employer succeeds in meeting its burden of production, "the McDonnell Douglas framework . . . is no longer relevant." Ante, at ____. Whereas we said in Burdine that if the employer carries its burden of production, "the factual inquiry proceeds to a new level of specificity," 450 U.S., at 255, 101 S.Ct., at 1095, the Court now holds that the further enquiry is wide open, not limited at all by the scope of the employer's proffered explanation.10 Despite the Court's assiduous effort to reinterpret our precedents, it remains clear that today's decision stems from a flat misreading of Burdine and ignores the central purpose of the McDonnell Douglas framework, which is "progressively to sharpen the inquiry into the elusive factual question of intentional discrimination." Id., at 255, n. 8, 101 S.Ct., at 1094, n. 8. We have repeatedly identified the compelling reason for limiting the factual issues in the final stage of a McDonnell Douglas case as "the requirement that the plaintiff be afforded a full and fair opportunity to demonstrate pretext." Id., at 258, 101 S.Ct., at 1096 (internal quotation marks omitted); see id., at 256, 101 S.Ct., at 1095 (the plaintiff "must have the opportunity to demonstrate" pretext); Aikens, supra, at 716, n. 5, 103 S.Ct., at 1482; Furnco, 438 U.S., at 578, 98 S.Ct., at 2950; McDonnell Douglas, 411 U.S., at 805, 93 S.Ct., at 1825-1826. The majority fails to explain how the plaintiff, under its scheme, will ever have a "full and fair opportunity" to demonstrate that reasons not articulated by the employer, but discerned in the record by the factfinder, are also unworthy of credence. The Court thus transforms the employer's burden of production from a device used to provide notice and promote fairness into a misleading and potentially useless ritual.

The majority's scheme greatly disfavors Title VII plaintiffs without the good luck to have direct evidence of discriminatory intent. The Court repeats the truism that the plaintiff has the "ultimate burden" of proving discrimination, see ante, at ____, ____, without ever facing the practical question of how the plaintiff without such direct evidence can meet this burden. Burdine provides the answer, telling us that such a plaintiff may succeed in meeting his ultimate burden of proving discrimination "indirectly by showing that the employer's proffered explanation is unworthy of credence." 450 U.S., at 256, 10 S.Ct., at 1095; see Aikens, supra, at 716, 103 S.Ct., at 1482; id., at 717-718, 103 S.Ct., at 1482-1483 (BLACKMUN, J., joined by Brennan, J., concurring). The possibility of some practical procedure for addressing what Burdine calls indirect proof is crucial to the success of most Title VII claims, for the simple reason that employers who discriminate are not likely to announce their discriminatory motive. And yet, under the majority's scheme, a victim of discrimination lacking direct evidence will now be saddled with the tremendous disadvantage of having to confront, not the defined task of proving the employer's stated reasons to be false, but the amorphous requirement of disproving all possible nondiscriminatory reasons that a factfinder might find lurking in the record. In the Court's own words, the plaintiff must "disprove all other reasons suggested, no matter how vaguely, in the record." Ante, at ____ (emphasis in original).

While the Court appears to acknowledge that a plaintiff will have the task of disproving even vaguely suggested reasons, and while it recognizes the need for "[c]larity regarding the requisite elements of proof," ante, at ____, it nonetheless gives conflicting signals about the scope of its holding in this case. In one passage, the Court states that although proof of the falsity of the employer's proffered reasons does not "compe[l] judgment for the plaintiff," such evidence, without more, "will permit the trier of fact to infer the ultimate fact of intentional discrimination." Ante, at ____ (emphasis omitted). The same view is implicit in the Court's decision to remand this case, ante, at ____, keeping Hicks's chance of winning a judgment alive although he has done no more (in addition to proving his prima facie case) than show that the reasons proffered by St. Mary's are unworthy of credence. But other language in the Court's opinion supports a more extreme conclusion, that proof of the falsity of the employer's articulated reasons will not even be sufficient to sustain judgment for the plaintiff. For example, the Court twice states that the plaintiff must show "both that the reason was false, and that discrimination was the real reason." Ante, at ____; see ante, at ____. In addition, in summing up its reading of our earlier cases, the Court states that "[i]t is not enough . . . to disbelieve the employer." Ante, at ____ (emphasis omitted). This "pretext-plus" approach would turn Burdine on its head, see n. 7, supra, and it would result in summary judgment for the employer in the many cases where the plaintiff has no evidence beyond that required to prove a prima facie case and to show that the employer's articulated reasons are unworthy of credence. Cf. Carter v. Duncan-Huggins, Ltd., 234 U.S.App.D.C. 126, 146, 727 F.2d 1225, 1245 (1984) (Scalia, J., dissenting) ("[I]n order to get to the jury the plaintiff would . . . have to introduce some evidence . . . that the basis for [the] discriminatory treatment was race ") (emphasis in original). See generally Lanctot, The Defendant Lies and the Plaintiff Loses: The Fallacy of the "Pretext-Plus" Rule in Employment Discrimination Cases, 43 Hastings L.J. 57 (1991) (criticizing the "pretext-plus" approach).

== See also ==
- US labor law
- List of United States Supreme Court cases, volume 509
- List of United States Supreme Court cases
- Lists of United States Supreme Court cases by volume
- List of United States Supreme Court cases by the Rehnquist Court
