= University of Texas at Austin College of Education =

College of Education

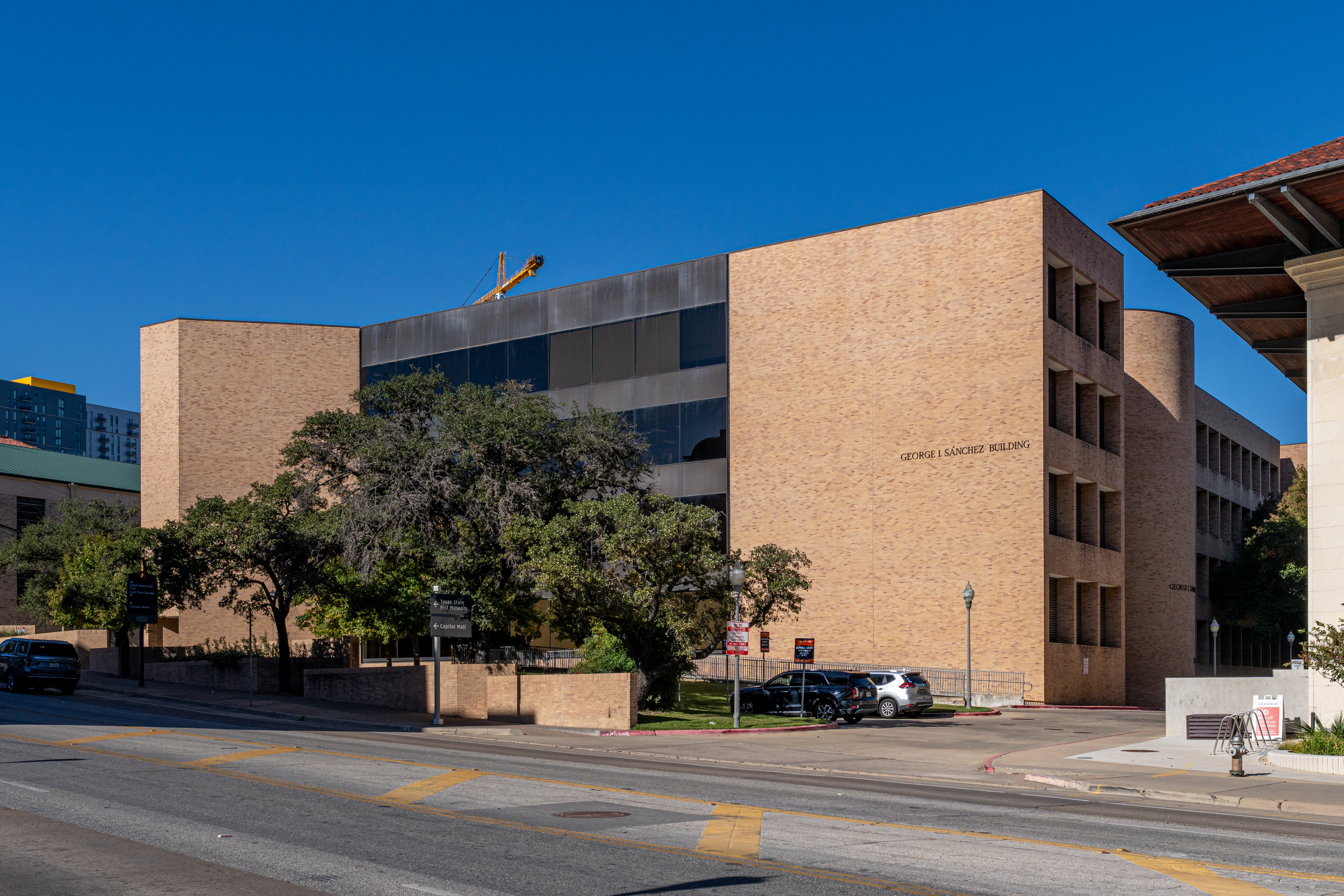
- The College of Education is housed in the George I. Sanchez Building on the University of Texas campus in Austin, Texas.
- Type: Public University College of Education
- Established: 1905
- Affiliations: University of Texas at Austin
- Endowment: $72.8 million (July 9, 2020)
- Dean: Charles Martinez
- Faculty: 106 full-time tenured/tenure track
- Students: 2,580
- Undergraduates: 1,780
- Postgraduates: 868
- Location: Austin, Texas, USA
- Campus: Urban
- Website: http://education.utexas.edu/

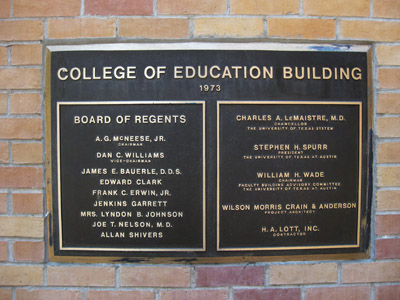
Among the members of the Board of Regents were former Texas governor Allan Shivers and former First Lady Mrs. Lyndon Baines Johnson.

The College of Education is the education school of the University of Texas at Austin.

One of 18 colleges and schools at the University of Texas in Austin, Texas, the College of Education provides a variety of academic degrees in education fields, as well as certification programs at all levels. It has consistently been ranked among the top public university graduate education programs by U.S. News & World Report. The 2025 edition of "Best Graduate Schools" ranks the College of Education sixth behind University of Wisconsin–Madison, Columbia University, University of Michigan, Vanderbilt University, and University of California, Los Angeles. The College employs 106 full-time tenured/tenure track professors and 145 non-tenure track.

== History ==
The College of Education was founded in 1891 as the School of Pedagogy. Joseph Baldwin, a leader in state and national education associations, was appointed the first professor of pedagogy by the University of Texas Board of Regents on August 25, 1891. It was established as the College of Education in 1905, with five departments, three centers, two offices, and one laboratory.

== Past and Present Deans ==
- William S. Sutton, 1909-1926
- B.F. Pittinger, 1926-1946
- Clarence T. Gray, Acting Dean, 1946
- Laurence D. Haskew, 1947-1961
- Clyde Colvert, 1962-1963
- Wayne H. Holtzman, 1964-1969
- Lorrin Kennamer, 1970-1986
- Waneen Spirduso, Interim Dean, 1987-1989
- Manuel Justiz, 1990-2017
- Sherry Field, Interim Dean, 2018
- Charles R. Martinez Jr., 2019–present

== Degree Programs ==
The College of Education offers three Undergraduate Degree Programs related to health, education, and the business of culture, sports, and entertainment industries:

- Bachelor of Science in Applied Learning and Development (ALD)
- Bachelor of Science in Athletic Training
- Bachelor of Science in Kinesiology and Health Education (KHE)

The Graduate Programs offered by the College of Education include master, doctoral, and certification programs that are managed by each of its five departments in concert with the Graduate School at the University of Texas at Austin. These programs offer research-driven experiences that pair theory and practice in collaborative environments and programs that may lead to a recommendation for teacher certification (the M.Ed.+).

== Diversity and Inclusion ==
The College of Education prioritizes diversity and inclusion as core values of the school. In May 2019, Dean Charles R. Martinez Jr. named Professor Richard Reddick the inaugural dean for equity, community, engagement, and outreach. In this role, Reddick provided leadership and focus to support the college’s continued commitment to advancing a culture of social justice, equity, diversity, and inclusion. Multiple facility members in the Department of Curriculum and Instruction prioritize the success of Latinx and African American students, teaching and researching topics such as the effect of racism on learning, the positive effect of biliteracy on long-term relationships with students, and the importance of diversity in early childhood.

The College of Education houses Project MALES (Mentoring to Achieve Latino Educational Success), a program dedicated to enhancing chances of success and retention of Latino males in both secondary and postsecondary education. It aims to combat the gender gap in educational attainment for Latino males.

== Program Rankings ==
For more than 20 years, the College of Education has been ranked by U.S. News & World Report as one of the best colleges of education in the country. In the 2025 edition, the college was ranked 6th overall.

College programs have been ranked highly in the following categories:

- Curriculum and Instruction
- Educational Administration and Supervision
- Educational Psychology
- Education Policy
- Elementary Teacher Education
- Higher Education Administration
- Secondary Teacher Education
- Special Education

As of 2020, the Department of Kinesiology and Health Education is ranked second by the National Academy of Kinesiology.

== Facilities ==
Administrative offices and classrooms for The College of Education are housed in the George I. Sánchez Building (SZB) and L. Theo Bellmont Hall (BEL). SZB is named after American education pioneer and civil rights activist George Isidore Sánchez, who earned a master's degree in Educational Psychology and Spanish at the University of Texas. The building is located four blocks north of the Texas Capitol at the intersection of Martin Luther King Jr. Boulevard and Speedway, adjacent to the Blanton Museum of Art, across from Jester Student Housing, and in back of the Perry–Castañeda Library on the University of Texas at Austin campus. BEL is located on the west side of Darrell K Royal-Texas Memorial Stadium facing San Jacinto Blvd. BEL is named for a former athletic director at The University of Texas at Austin.

== Affiliated institutions ==
- University of Texas Elementary School
