= Verona, Mississippi =

City in Mississippi, United States

- City
- Flag

- Location within Lee County and the State of Mississippi

- Location within the contiguous United States of America
- Coordinates: 34°11′18″N 88°43′5″W
- Country: United States
- State: Mississippi
- County: Lee
- Districts: 4, 5
- Founded: April 16, 1857
- Chartered: July 18, 1860
- Named for: Verona, Italy

Area
  - Total: 3.71 sq mi (9.60 km^{2})
  - Land: 3.67 sq mi (9.51 km^{2})
  - Water: 0.035 sq mi (0.09 km^{2})
- Elevation: 325 ft (99 m)

Population (2020)
  - Total: 2,792
  - Density: 760.3/sq mi (293.54/km^{2})
- Time zone: UTC-6 (Central (CST))
  - Summer (DST): UTC-5 (CDT)
- ZIP code: 38879
- Area code: 662
- FIPS code: 28-76560
- GNIS feature ID: 0679211

Verona is a City in Lee County, Mississippi. The population was 2,792 at the 2020 census, down from 3,006 at the 2010 census.

== History ==
The city is named after Verona, Italy

A post office was built at Verona April 16, 1857.

The Mobile and Ohio Railroad built a line through Verona around July 1860, with the town being chartered shortly thereafter on July 18, 1860.

During the Civil War, Verona was a Confederate supply depot and training camp. On December 25, 1864, Verona was raided by Federal Brigadier-General Benjamin Grierson's cavalry. In 1876, the first bank in Lee County (later known as BancorpSouth) was chartered here. Peoples Bank and the Bank of Mississippi also have roots in Verona. Elvis Presley's parents were married here in 1933.

== Geography ==
Verona is located at 34°11′18″N 88°43′5″W (34.188350, -88.718083).

According to the United States Census Bureau, the city has a total area of 3.8 square miles (9.8 km^{2}), of which 3.7 square miles (9.6 km^{2}) is land and 0.04 square miles (0.10 km^{2}) (0.80%) is water.

=== Climate ===
Climate data for Verona Experiment Station, Mississippi (1991–2020 normals, extremes 1987–present)
Month	Jan	Feb	Mar	Apr	May	Jun	Jul	Aug	Sep	Oct	Nov	Dec	Year
Record high °F (°C)	78 (26)	82 (28)	88 (31)	94 (34)	99 (37)	104 (40)	104 (40)	106 (41)	101 (38)	95 (35)	90 (32)	80 (27)	106 (41)
Mean daily maximum °F (°C)	52.8 (11.6)	57.2 (14.0)	66.3 (19.1)	74.8 (23.8)	83.1 (28.4)	89.5 (31.9)	92.4 (33.6)	92.3 (33.5)	87.6 (30.9)	76.8 (24.9)	64.7 (18.2)	55.7 (13.2)	74.4 (23.6)
Daily mean °F (°C)	42.6 (5.9)	46.2 (7.9)	54.6 (12.6)	62.9 (17.2)	71.7 (22.1)	78.9 (26.1)	82.1 (27.8)	81.3 (27.4)	75.6 (24.2)	64.0 (17.8)	52.7 (11.5)	45.4 (7.4)	63.2 (17.3)
Mean daily minimum °F (°C)	32.5 (0.3)	35.2 (1.8)	42.9 (6.1)	51.0 (10.6)	60.4 (15.8)	68.4 (20.2)	71.8 (22.1)	70.4 (21.3)	63.7 (17.6)	51.1 (10.6)	40.8 (4.9)	35.1 (1.7)	51.9 (11.1)
Record low °F (°C)	5 (−15)	3 (−16)	14 (−10)	27 (−3)	37 (3)	49 (9)	52 (11)	53 (12)	41 (5)	28 (−2)	18 (−8)	−4 (−20)	−4 (−20)
Average precipitation inches (mm)	5.19 (132)	5.29 (134)	5.64 (143)	5.54 (141)	5.34 (136)	4.80 (122)	4.65 (118)	4.04 (103)	3.82 (97)	4.35 (110)	4.58 (116)	6.10 (155)	59.34 (1,507)
Average snowfall inches (cm)	0.0 (0.0)	0.0 (0.0)	0.0 (0.0)	0.0 (0.0)	0.0 (0.0)	0.0 (0.0)	0.0 (0.0)	0.0 (0.0)	0.0 (0.0)	0.0 (0.0)	0.0 (0.0)	0.0 (0.0)	0.0 (0.0)
Average precipitation days (≥ 0.01 in)	9.9	9.7	10.3	8.3	9.6	9.8	9.2	7.6	6.4	6.8	9.0	11.0	107.6
Average snowy days (≥ 0.1 in)	0.0	0.0	0.0	0.0	0.0	0.0	0.0	0.0	0.0	0.0	0.0	0.0	0.0
Source: NOAA

== Demographics ==
Historical population
Census	Pop.	Note	%±
1880	596		—
1890	465		−22.0%
1900	456		−1.9%
1910	558		22.4%
1920	500		−10.4%
1930	554		10.8%
1940	526		−5.1%
1950	589		12.0%
1960	824		39.9%
1970	1,877		127.8%
1980	2,497		33.0%
1990	2,893		15.9%
2000	3,334		15.2%
2010	3,006		−9.8%
2020	2,792		−7.1%
U.S. Decennial Census

=== Racial and ethnic composition ===
Verona city, Mississippi – Racial and ethnic composition Note: the US Census treats Hispanic/Latino as an ethnic category. This table excludes Latinos from the racial categories and assigns them to a separate category. Hispanics/Latinos may be of any race.
Race / Ethnicity (NH = Non-Hispanic)	Pop 2000	Pop 2010	Pop 2020	% 2000	% 2010	% 2020
White alone (NH)	1,277	717	441	38.30%	23.85%	15.80%
Black or African American alone (NH)	1,920	2,094	2,205	57.59%	69.66%	78.98%
Native American or Alaska Native alone (NH)	14	6	5	0.42%	0.20%	0.18%
Asian alone (NH)	11	9	1	0.33%	0.30%	0.04%
Native Hawaiian or Pacific Islander alone (NH)	0	0	3	0.00%	0.00%	0.11%
Other race alone (NH)	6	0	12	0.18%	0.00%	0.43%
Mixed race or Multiracial (NH)	32	41	70	0.96%	1.36%	2.51%
Hispanic or Latino (any race)	74	139	55	2.22%	4.62%	1.97%
Total	3,334	3,006	2,792	100.00%	100.00%	100.00%

=== 2020 census ===
As of the 2020 census, Verona had a population of 2,792. The median age was 34.3 years. 26.9% of residents were under the age of 18 and 14.0% of residents were 65 years of age or older. For every 100 females there were 84.3 males, and for every 100 females age 18 and over there were 75.3 males age 18 and over.

97.4% of residents lived in urban areas, while 2.6% lived in rural areas.

There were 1,154 households in Verona, of which 32.8% had children under the age of 18 living in them. Of all households, 21.9% were married-couple households, 20.9% were households with a male householder and no spouse or partner present, and 48.3% were households with a female householder and no spouse or partner present. About 34.1% of all households were made up of individuals and 13.4% had someone living alone who was 65 years of age or older.

There were 1,305 housing units, of which 11.6% were vacant. The homeowner vacancy rate was 2.8% and the rental vacancy rate was 10.2%.

Racial composition as of the 2020 census
Race	Number	Percent
White	450	16.1%
Black or African American	2,217	79.4%
American Indian and Alaska Native	11	0.4%
Asian	1	0.0%
Native Hawaiian and Other Pacific Islander	3	0.1%
Some other race	29	1.0%
Two or more races	81	2.9%

=== 2000 census ===
As of the census of 2000, there were 3,334 people, 1,276 households, and 831 families residing in the city. The population density was 891.4 inhabitants per square mile (344.2/km^{2}). There were 1,472 housing units at an average density of 393.6 per square mile (152.0/km^{2}). The racial makeup of the city was 38.78% White, 57.68% African American, 0.42% Native American, 0.33% Asian, 1.65% from other races, and 1.14% from two or more races. Hispanic or Latino of any race were 2.22% of the population.

There were 1,276 households, out of which 37.1% had children under the age of 18 living with them, 36.1% were married couples living together, 22.6% had a female householder with no husband present, and 34.8% were non-families. 28.8% of all households were made up of individuals, and 10.0% had someone living alone who was 65 years of age or older. The average household size was 2.61 and the average family size was 3.22.

In the city, the population was spread out, with 33.1% under the age of 18, 9.5% from 18 to 24, 30.6% from 25 to 44, 17.0% from 45 to 64, and 9.7% who were 65 years of age or older. The median age was 30 years. For every 100 females, there were 91.1 males. For every 100 females age 18 and over, there were 84.4 males.

The median income for a household in the city was $26,117, and the median income for a family was $30,255. Males had a median income of $25,000 versus $18,305 for females. The per capita income for the city was $12,092. About 18.5% of families and 22.2% of the population were below the poverty line, including 29.9% of those under age 18 and 22.6% of those age 65 or over.

== Education ==
Verona is served by the Lee County School District.

== Notable people ==
- Roddy Burdine, former owner of the now-defunct department store Burdines
- Winfield R. Gaylord, minister and member of the Wisconsin State Senate from 1909 to 1913
- Chester W. Taylor, member of the United States House of Representatives from 1921 to 1923
