= Garrison Hall =

Building in Austin, Texas, U.S.

Coordinates: 30.2852°N 97.7385°W

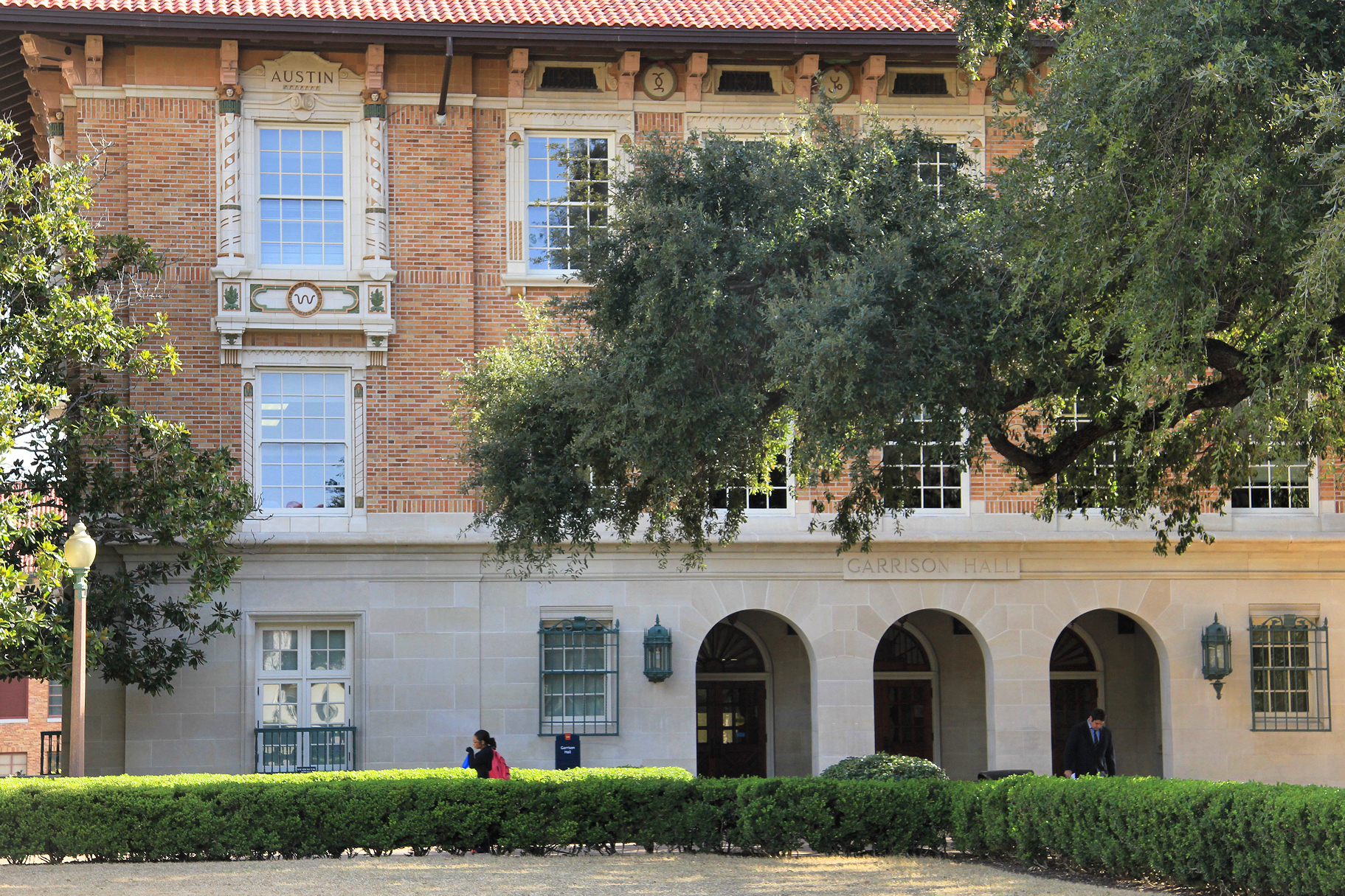
- West entrance of Garrison Hall from the South Mall
- Alternative names: GAR

General information
- Type: Academic building
- Architectural style: Mediterranean Revival
- Location: 128 Inner Campus Drive, Austin, Texas, United States
- Named for: George Pierce Garrison
- Construction started: 1925
- Completed: 1926
- Renovated: 2007-2008
- Cost: US$370,000
- Renovation cost: $8.9 million
- Owner: University of Texas at Austin

Technical details
- Material: Granite, limestone, brick, terracotta
- Floor count: 5
- Floor area: 51,822 sq ft (4,814.4 m^{2})

Design and construction
- Architect: Herbert M. Greene

Renovating team
- Renovating firm: Architexas

Garrison Hall (abbreviated GAR) is an American academic building. It is located on the University of Texas at Austin campus and houses the Department of History. The building is named after George Pierce Garrison, the history department's first chair and a founding member of the Texas State Historical Association. It was designed by Herbert M. Greene as part of a 1924 campus plan in the Mediterranean Revival style popularized on campus by Cass Gilbert. Construction began in 1925 and finished the following year, with an internal renovation completed in 2008.

Multiple subjects have been taught at Garrison Hall, although primarily history. The building contains five stories and is set on the South Mall across from Battle Hall. Its base and steps are made from granite with the rest of the building's exterior mostly using limestone. Motifs of Texas history decorate the exterior, including the names of several figures of the Texas Revolution and 36 historic cattle brands from the Spanish period through the 1920s.

== History ==
Garrison Hall emerged as part of a 1922 decision by the University of Texas Board of Regents to develop a new plan for the Austin campus. Since 1910, New York architect Cass Gilbert had designed much of the campus. As the university's architect, he developed a Mediterranean Revival style across the campus' buildings. Local architects, however, pressed the Board of Regents to select a new, Texas-based architect for the new campus plan. The Board selected Dallas architect Herbert M. Greene, Austin architect Robert Leon White, and Illinois architect James White to develop the new campus plan in 1924, including Garrison Hall, which was designed by Greene.

The building's construction began in 1925 and finished in 1926, costing $370,000. Since 1926, the building has housed the university's Department of History, although throughout its history it was also used for classes in English, psychology, economics, government, and sociology. The building was originally called the "Recitation" building but was later renamed for George Pierce Garrison, who taught history at the university from 1884 and was the first chair of the history department. In the early 1930s, Garrison's north entrance was infested by bats, which architecture department chair Goldwin Goldsmith recommended be cleared with fire extinguishers. The building underwent a $8.9 million renovation in 2007 to remodel and modernize its interior, reopening in 2008.

== Design ==
Garrison Hall contains five stories and a total floor plan of 51,822 square feet (14,104.72 square meters), with an L-shaped outline, and sits on a steep, 20-foot (6-meter) slope. Like the adjacent Waggener Hall, its base, steps, and door sills are made from Pearl Gray granite with Leuders limestone used above the base. Stylistically, Garrison's design follows that of pre-existing structures on the campus, with decorative terracotta and clay-tile roofs.

The ornamentation on Garrison takes inspiration from that of nearby Battle Hall, but modifies its theme from academics to the history of Texas. The exterior of the second floor features the engraved surnames of several figures in Texas history, including Stephen F. Austin, William B. Travis, Sam Houston, Mirabeau B. Lamar, and Anson Jones, while walls under the building's eaves contain 32 cattle brands, both Spanish and Texan. The brands were chosen from historical ranches ranging from the 1760s to the 1920s, and are arranged chronologically from west to east. The symbol of King Ranch appears under Austin's name. The building is also decorated with other Texan images, such as cacti, deer skulls, lone stars, and bluebonnets, as well as Classical features like Ionic elements and wide arches. The building's cornerstone is hollow and contains a time capsule with newspapers and letters from the early 20th century. Because the university initially planned for the East Mall to be the university's main entrance, before switching to the South Mall, Garrison Hall sits slightly south of Battle Hall instead of directly facing it across the South Mall.

== Works cited ==
- Baird, David (2007). Frommer's San Antonio & Austin. Frommer's. ISBN 9780470082997.
- Ellison Jr., S.P.; Jones, J.J. (1984). Walking the Forty Acres: Building Stones Precambrian to Pleistocene. The University of Texas at Austin Retired Faculty-Staff Association.
- Wiencek, Henry (2012). "An Architectural History of Garrison Hall". Not Even Past.
