= University of Texas Elementary School =

Charter elementary school in Austin, Texas

Coordinates: 30.260261°N 97.717467°W

Location
- 2200 East Sixth Street; Austin, Texas 78702; United States

Information
- Other name: UTES
- Locale: City
- NCES District ID: 4800251
- Educational authority: Texas Education Agency
- Oversight: University of Texas at Austin College of Education
- Superintendent: Nicole Whetstone
- NCES School ID: 480025109530
- Principal: Lara Wilder
- Teaching staff: 22.00 (FTE)
- Gender: Coeducational
- Enrollment: 304 (2024-2025)
- Capacity: 308
  - Pre-kindergarten: 42
  - Kindergarten: 43
  - Grade 1: 44
  - Grade 2: 44
  - Grade 3: 44
  - Grade 4: 44
  - Grade 5: 43
- Student to teacher ratio: 13.82
- Mascot: Little Longhorn
- Website: utelementary.org

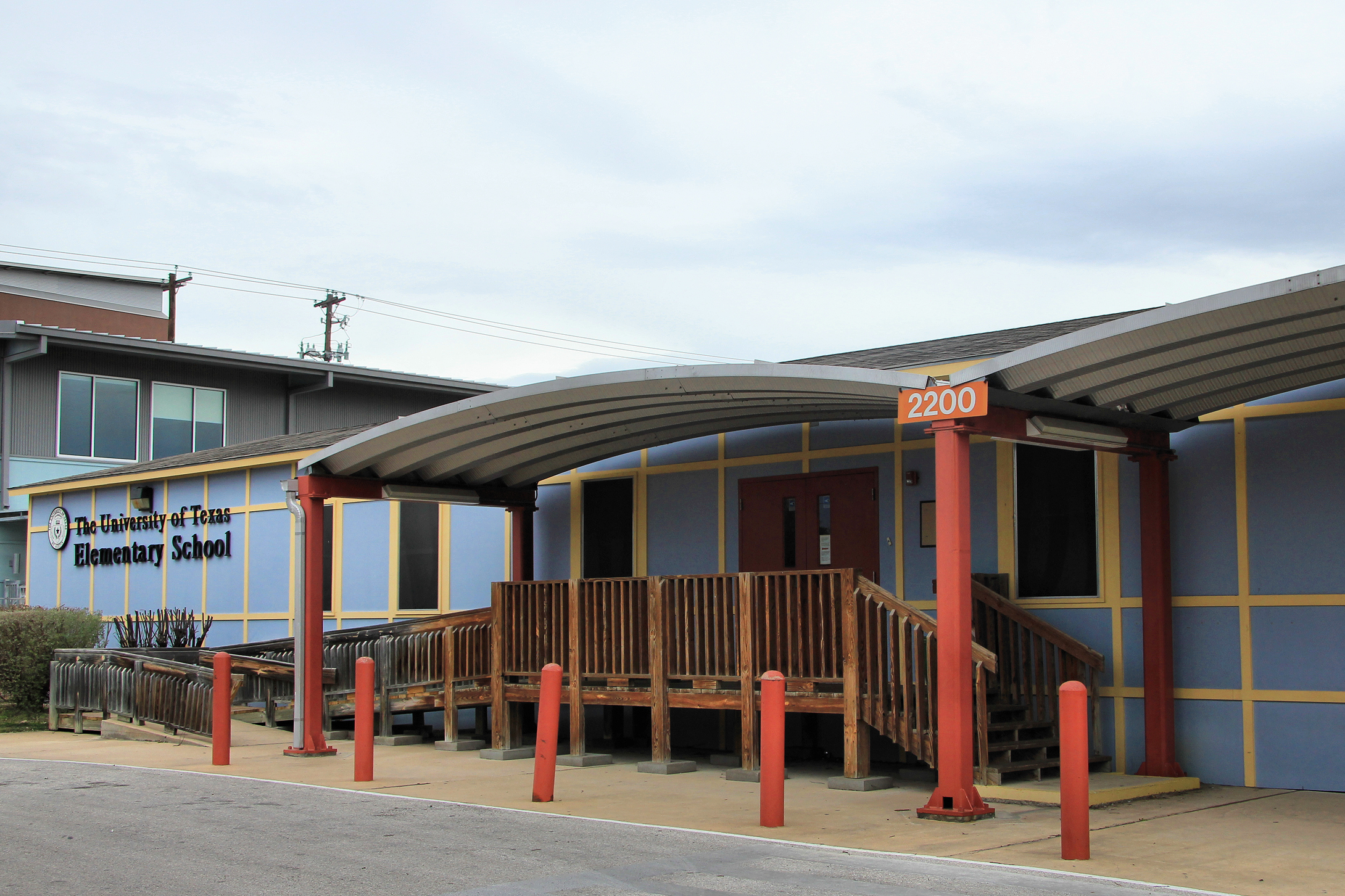
University of Texas Elementary School

University of Texas Elementary School is a state charter primary school located at 2200 East 6th Street in Austin, Texas, United States. The school is affiliated with the University of Texas at Austin College of Education.

== History ==
In 2001 a law was passed that allowed universities in Texas to create charter schools. The Board of Regents of the University of Texas System agreed to establish UTES. That year, the Texas State Board of Education accepted the UT System's proposal for UTES.

By 2002 the school proposal caused friction between the University of Texas at Austin and the Austin Independent School District. Sharon Jayson of the Austin American-Statesman predicted that the charter school, which would become the 17th charter school in central Texas and would serve a 25-square-mile (65 km^{2}) area, would take students from one third of Austin ISD's campuses and two of Del Valle Independent School District's six schools. The school opened in August 2003. In fall 2006 the school added the fourth grade, with the fifth grade added the following year.

Grade levels were added each year until the 5th grade began operations in 2007.

== See also ==
- University of Houston Charter School
