= Joseph Baldwin =

American educationalist

Joseph Baldwin

Joseph Baldwin (October 31, 1827, some sources indicate October 27, 1827 – January 13, 1899) was an American educator, and called by some the "father of the normal school system".

== Early life ==
Baldwin was born to Joseph and Isabella (née Cairns) in New Castle, Pennsylvania. His lifework has been characterized by a pair of related tensions: between religious zeal and a recognition of the need for teachers well-educated in secular subjects, and between potentially opposed emphases on technical training and the liberal arts in teacher preparation. He founded a series of educational institutions which survive into the present day, each of which still bears some mark of his influence.

A story told by his sister relates that, while plowing his father's fields, upon reaching the end of each furrow, he would pick up a book, find where he last left off, read the next paragraph, put the book down, and proceed to plow the next row. Headed back across the field, he meditated on the newly acquired fragment of knowledge.

== Primary education ==
He was educated in Bartlett's Academy, near New Castle, Pennsylvania. At the age of 18 he began keeping a diary which bears witness to a religiosity which would remain deeply interwoven with his educational philosophy throughout his career. "Saved" during a serious illness at fourteen, he continued to struggle with his "direful condition" in a search for salvation. He visited the sick and dying and attended the dead. Conversion and baptism renewed him (April 2–3, 1845), and he dedicated himself to serving Christ (May 1, 1845). At this early period, a sense of the tension between his religious and worldly impulses is evident. Secular reading was one of his distractions. He lamented: "I have spent a considerable portion of my time in reading History and Biography and thus have neglected the most important of books to wit the Bible. May in future make this my study and may I use it as my sword" (September 14, 1845).

== Dedications ==
Even at the age of eighteen, he had consciously dedicated himself to a religiously-conceived mission of educating the young. He thought "youth" (such as himself), deserving of eternal punishment but nonetheless worth "saving". In 1847, he attended school a full forty weeks and worked about a month and a half. Practicing what he preached, when he was invited to a party, he chose to spend his time studying rather "than in hurtful folly" (February 6). Passing a room where "many youths were engaged in mirthful danceing [sic]", he writes, "I was struck with the reflection that all these thoughtless youths must soon appear before the judge of all" (March 10). His stated ambitions evince an ambivalence between the desires for prominence and service: "I long to become an orator; that I may do good to my fellow men."

== Higher education ==
In 1848, Baldwin entered Bethany College, where he would take the B.A. in 1852. While at Bethany, he lived in the home of the school's founder and president, Rev. Alexander Campbell, founder of the Disciples of Christ Church. There he studied, recited, debated, and helped to form an "economical society" whose members pledged to assist one another in case of sickness; he became its president. Baldwin excelled, ranking first or second in his classes. His censure of other youths, including his fellow students, continued: "Alas follish [sic] young men! You do not feal [sic] the values of life" (April 5, 1849). In his later career as an educator, he would show no mercy to students found guilty of his three horrors: dancing, card-playing and drinking.

In emotional affairs as in professional, Baldwin's diary evidences a strong sense of priorities. In August 1849 he went to the county meeting in the company of one Emaline McC., "whom I think would make a suitable companion for me for life.... If it is the will of God to spare my life & hers, and if he so permit, we may be united by the bans of matrimony; after I have completed my College course."

Back in school in September 1849, Baldwin spent his days writing to this same Emaline (who would not, in fact, become his life-partner), studying hard, and finding "Pope Homers Iliad" truly admirable, if filled with much of which he disapproved. Reading Cicero, writing compositions and orations, Baldwin demonstrated an iron discipline, which he would later expect of his students. Partly contradicting his dedication to a higher spirit is his self-puffery: "Declaimed in society a piece called 'The Whiskers.' Succeeded better than ever before. One remarked publicly that it was the best he had ever heard. But O! how far short of what I desire, what vast heights still remain to be assended [sic]."

After graduation Joseph Baldwin went west to pursue the newly emerging professional career of a college professor. In 1853 he taught at the Platte City Male and Female Academy in Missouri, and by 1855 he was co-principal of a collegiate institution in Savannah, Missouri.

== Marriage ==
On August 26, 1852 he married Ellen (or Ella) Sophronia Fluhart (b. 1828, Ohio - d. November 26, 1924, San Diego, California). It had been his intention to enter the ministry, but his responsibilities as a newly married man required him to make a living as a teacher. In the spring of 1856, he helped found the Missouri State Teachers Association and was elected vice president. The following autumn, he returned to Pennsylvania and enrolled at Lancaster County Normal School to receive training specific to his newfound vocation.

== Career ==
From 1857 to 1863, Baldwin led normal schools, including the Farmington Male and Female Seminary (Burnettsville, Indiana) and a new institution at Kokomo, Indiana. Founded as Farmington Academy in the southwestern part of town, in 1858 Baldwin opened the Indiana Normal. This was Indiana's first Normal School and the fifth in the United States.

At Kokomo, Indiana, Baldwin provided the first impetus to higher education. A joint stock company, the Normal School Association, was organized in 1859 under Baldwin's direction, placing emphasis on the "normal" method of instruction to prepare students to become teachers. This was an early example of the spirit, at once scientific, evangelical and entrepreneurial, which characterized all of Baldwin's educational projects. Center Township provided $3,000 for the construction of a Normal Building. The money was provided on the condition that the township would have the use of the four lower rooms for a free school known as the Indiana State Normal School of Kokomo. He taught a few students in a one story frame building near the present intersection of Mulberry and Main Streets. Classes at the Normal School began in 1863-64.

== Military service ==
Although never really robust in health or constitution, during the Civil War, Baldwin organized Company B of the 118th Indiana Infantry, a company made up of Kokomo students. Capt. Baldwin and the 30-40 men of his command served from July 1863 to March 1864, and saw action at Blue Springs (October 10, 1863), Walker's Ford (December 2) and Tazewell (January 24, 1864). After the war he moved to Logansport, Indiana, where he became Principal of Logansport Seminary and of Cass County Normal School.

In February 1867, Baldwin resolved to found a new teacher-preparation institute. With the advice of Major J. B. Merwin of St. Louis, editor of the American Journal of Education, and his own nephew, J. J. Grigsby of Kirksville, Missouri, he selected Kirksville as the location. Another factor that helped Baldwin decide on Kirksville was the availability of a ready-made structure -the Cumberland Academy Building - that fulfilled all the needs for the school. Built in 1860, the building, located on the corner of Mulanix and Hickory Streets (now Memorial Park), resembled a church, complete with a tall steeple. It had served as McNeil's headquarters during the Battle of Kirksville. It was originally built to house a school known as the Cumberland Academy. Baldwin leased the building for $100 per year.

== Normal schools ==
On September 2, 1867, the North Missouri Normal School and Commercial College opened. In 1870, the state legislature provided for the creation of the normal school system and Baldwin, who was named a member of the organizing board of regents, offered his school to the state. His offer was accepted, and the school came under state control as the First District Normal School on December 29, 1870; Baldwin was named president.

When Baldwin's North Missouri Normal School outgrew the Cumberland Academy building, a site was chosen for a new building. At the time, the new location selected for the school was a cornfield just outside the Kirksville city limits. To meet the state's demands that the school be located inside the city limits of a county seat, the Kirksville city limits had to be extended to include the property.

Although not named formally, the building became known as the Normal Building (and much later, "Baldwin Hall"). An impressive tower in the center of the building rose 126 feet (38 m) up toward the sky, creating a landmark that was visible for miles. Historical documents state that approximately 600-700 students could be accommodated in the building, which was divided into teachers' rooms, a library, a laboratory, a large assembly room, recitation rooms, as well as other various rooms. The large hall had a 35-foot-high (11 m) ceiling that featured beautiful open timber work. The entire cost of the Normal Building was $101,400 - all a testimony to Baldwin's powers of organization and persuasion, and the regard with which this newcomer was held in the community. The institution Baldwin founded would grow to become Truman State University.

== Sam Houston Normal Institute ==
In 1881, Baldwin was on a lecture tour, and by a chain of circumstances not fully known, was elected principal of one of the institutions he visited. Baldwin left Kirksville in 1881 to become the third principal of the Sam Houston Normal Institute (now Sam Houston State University), replacing the recently resigned president, H.H. Smith, and bringing along his daughter Olivia Baldwin as the founder of the Art faculty; his daughter Zoe would also teach there. Under his presidency, in 1890, Old Main was built and occupied, allowing space for an additional year of study for students wishing to remain beyond the traditional two-year program – part of Baldwin's lifelong efforts to enforce rigor and depth in the training of public school teachers.

He created seven departments of study for the Institute: professional work; natural and physical science; English and literature; vocal music and calisthenics; rhetoric, etymology, and physiology; and elocution, drawing, and penmanship. He served from 1881–91, leaving to accept the newly created chair in pedagogy at the University of Texas at Austin. His chief achievement was to raise awareness of the need for teacher training specific to the requirements of public school administrators and teachers of specialized subjects in the high schools. This school would eventually become the University of Texas College of Education. Baldwin retired as professor emeritus in 1897 and died January 13, 1899, aged 71. He was buried in Oakwood Cemetery in Austin, Texas.

== Children ==
Baldwin had nine children: Icilius Victor Baldwin (1853), Anabel B. Baldwin Sublette (1856), Olivia Artemesia Baldwin (1858), Coramantha M. Baldwin Haston (1860), Joseph Rolla Baldwin (1863), Rachel Irene Baldwin(1865) Harold Baldwin (1868), Norma Mable Baldwin (1870), and Zoe Lenore Baldwin Sublette (1874).

== Publications ==
While living in Texas he wrote several books on education:

- Art of School Management (1881)
- Elementary Psychology and Education, a text-book for high schools, normal schools, normal institutes, and reading circles, and a manual for teachers. (1887) another ed. D. Appleton, New York, 1897
- Psychology Applied to the Art of Teaching (1892)
- School Management and School Methods (1897)

== Honors ==
Joseph Baldwin statue on the Truman State University campus

Baldwin received an honorary LL.D from Bethany College in 1891. He is memorialized at Truman State University by Baldwin Hall ("Old" Baldwin, the building Baldwin himself constructed, burned 1924; the cornerstone for "New" Baldwin was laid in 1938), the prestigious annual Baldwin Lecture, and the Joseph Baldwin Academy for Eminent Young Scholars. There is also a lifesize bronze statue of Baldwin on the quadrangle.

The Education Building at Sam Houston State University, built in 1918, was meant to be renamed for Baldwin in 1981, but was demolished the next year.
