= Cactus Cafe =

Live music venue at the University of Texas at Austin

Coordinates: 30.286109°N 97.741365°W

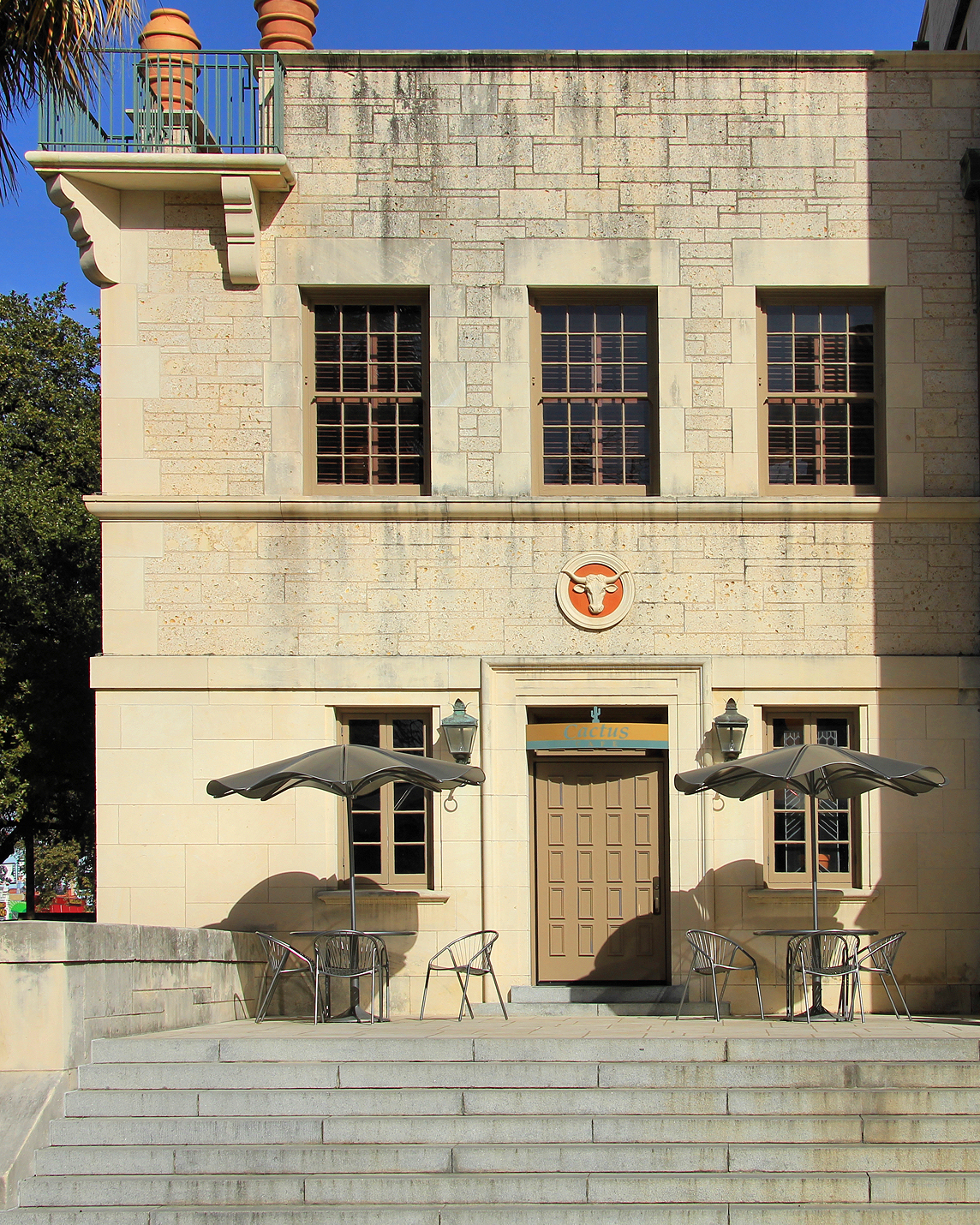
Entrance to the Cactus Cafe

The Cactus Café is a live music venue and bar on the campus of The University of Texas at Austin. Located in Austin, Texas, a city frequently referred to as "the live music capital of the world," a number of well-known artists have played in the Cactus, and Billboard Magazine named it as one of fifteen "solidly respected, savvy clubs" in the United States, "from which careers can be cut, that work with proven names and new faces."

== Overview ==
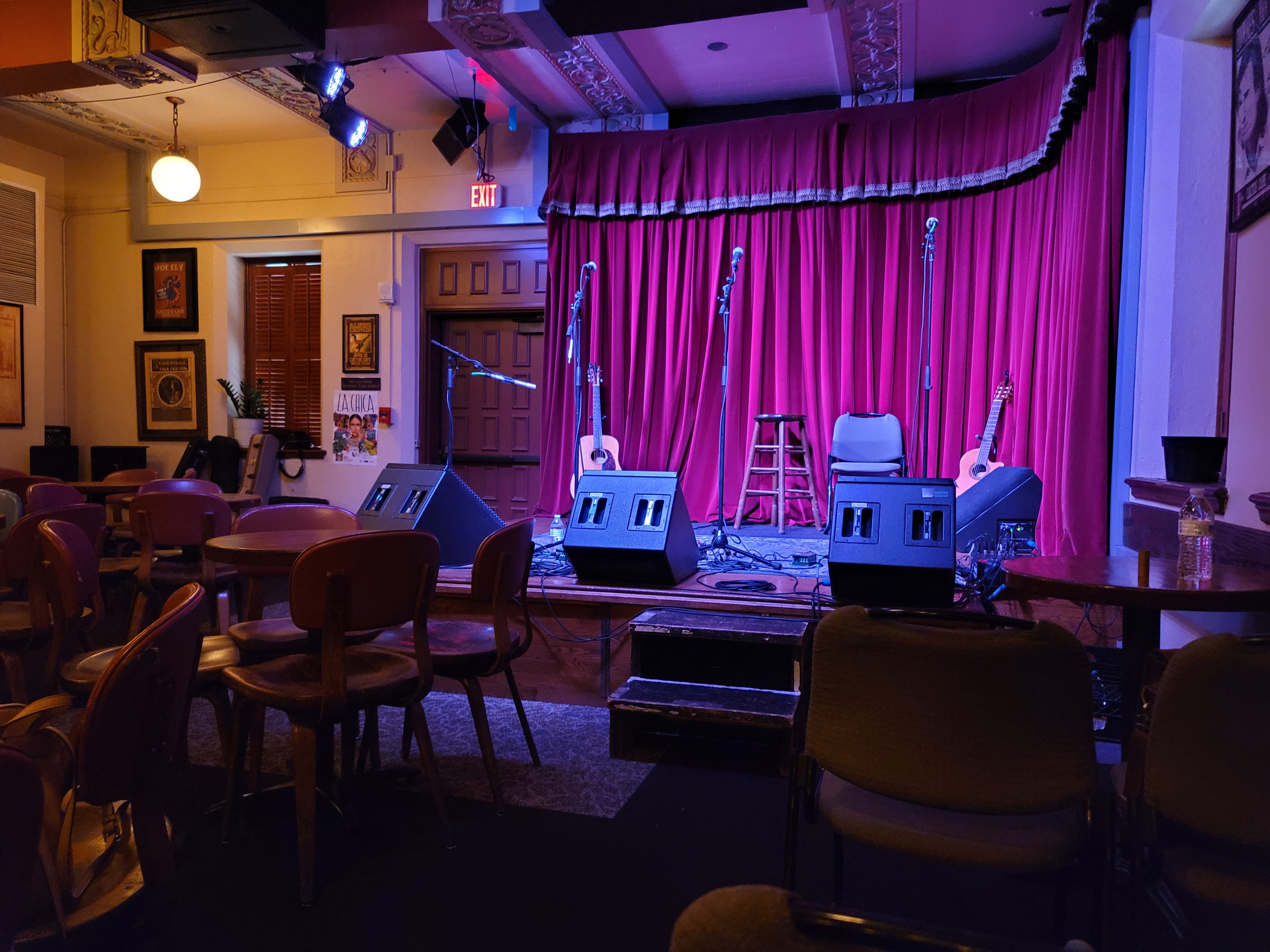
Stage of the Cactus Cafe

The Cactus Café, which opened in 1979, is located in the Union Building. The Café is a fairly intimate venue, known for its acoustics.

In 2010, the university announced that the Cactus Café would be closing. The decision was met with widespread shock and opposition in the Austin community, from musicians, and among students.

== Artists ==
A wide array of well-known artists played at the Cactus Café, many earlier in their careers. Lyle Lovett told the Austin Chronicle, "For a long time, the Cactus Café was the only place I played in Austin."

Notable Texans that have played at the Cafe include:

- Singer/songwriters
  - Danny Barnes
  - Guy Clark
  - Hayes Carll
  - Joe Ely
  - Alejandro Escovedo
  - Jimmie Dale Gilmore
  - Butch Hancock
  - Robert Earl Keen
  - Bob Schneider
  - Townes Van Zandt
  - Jerry Jeff Walker
  - Don Walser
  - T-Bone Burnett
  - Darden Smith
- Bands
  - Asylum Street Spankers
  - Bad Livers
  - Dixie Chicks
  - The Flatlanders
  - Okkervil River
  - Shearwater

Notable national and international artists that have played at the Cafe include:

- Singer/songwriters
  - Brandi Carlile
  - Peter Case
  - Ani DiFranco
  - Kristin Hersh
  - Paul Kelly
  - Alison Krauss
  - Bob Mould
  - Jason Mraz
  - Sharon Shannon
  - Todd Snider
  - Loudon Wainwright III
  - Ron Sexsmith
  - Milla Jovovich
- Bands
  - Battlefield Band
  - Black Crowes
  - Nickel Creek
  - Everything But the Girl

== Threatened closing and controversy ==
In a press release on 30 January 2009, the university announced that the Cactus Café would be closing, and cited student leaders on the Texas Union Board as the decision-makers.

Members of the Austin community formed a non-profit, Friends of the Cactus Café, to attempt to save the venue. An arrangement was eventually made to keep the venue open under the auspices and management of the University of Texas operated public radio station KUT.
