= Little Campus =

Historic district in Austin, Texas

- U.S. National Register of Historic Places
- U.S. Historic district
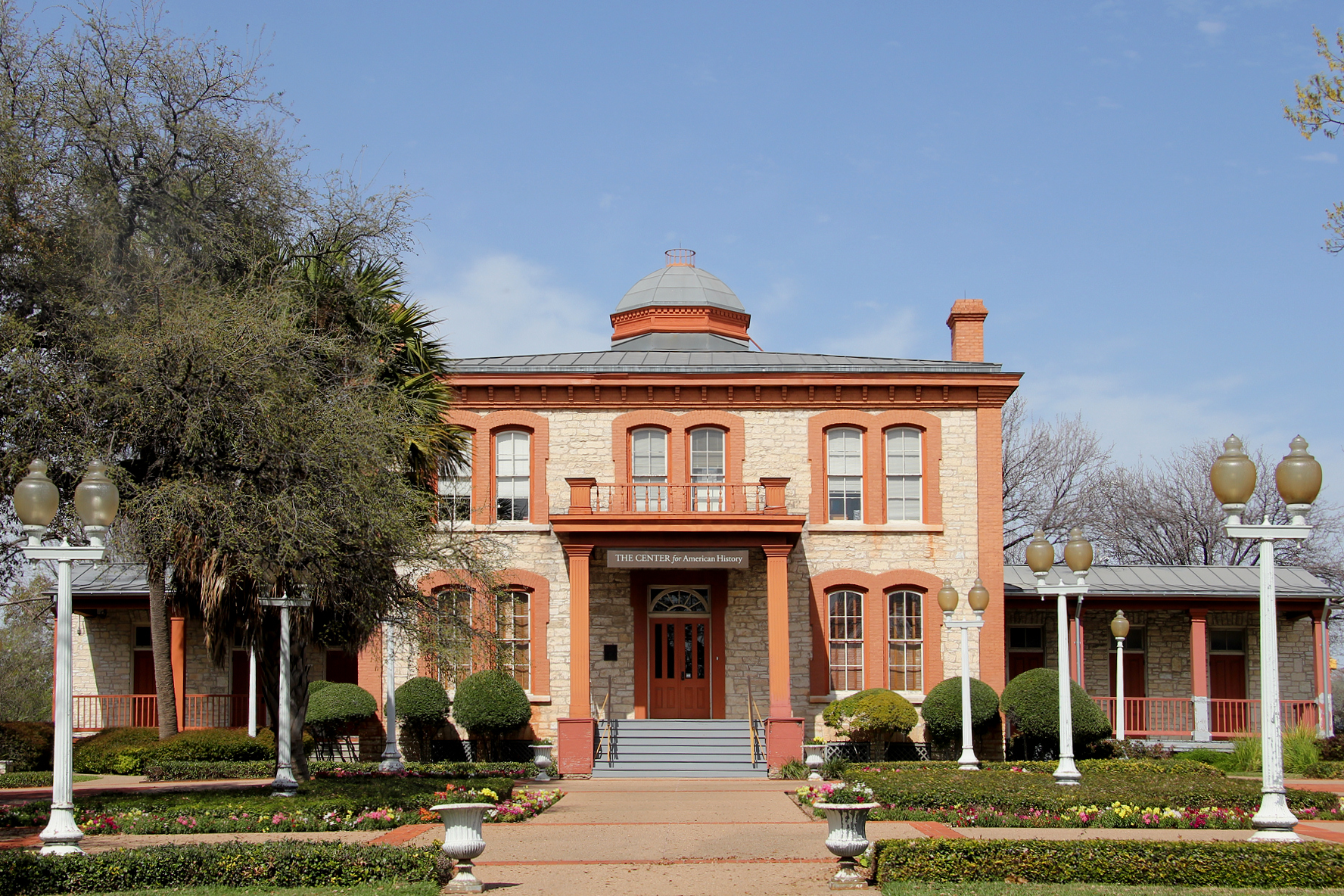
- The original main building of the Little Campus, now known as the Arno Nowotny Building
- Location: Bounded by 18th, Oldham, 19th, and Red River Sts., Austin, Texas
- Coordinates: 30°16′42″N 97°43′53″W
- Area: 7 acres (2.8 ha)
- Built: 1856
- Architect: Abner H. Cook
- Architectural style: Italianate
- NRHP reference No.: 74002091
- Added to NRHP: August 13, 1974

The Little Campus (officially the Heman Sweatt Campus) is a historic district and part of the University of Texas at Austin campus in Austin, Texas. Originally built in 1856 as the Texas Asylum for the Blind, the complex was used for a variety of purposes through the late nineteenth and early twentieth centuries. It was acquired by the University of Texas after World War I and listed on the National Register of Historic Places in 1974.

== History ==
On August 16, 1856, the Texas Legislature enacted a measure providing for the establishment of a Texas Asylum for the Blind (now known as the Texas School for the Blind and Visually Impaired) in Austin. The state leased the Neill–Cochran House as a temporary site for the asylum while a permanent building was constructed. The asylum facility was built between 1856 and 1857 at a cost of $12,390 (equivalent to $428,000 in 2025). In 1857 the asylum moved into its building, where it operated until the end of the American Civil War in 1865, at which point the campus was commandeered by General George Armstrong Custer, who used the facility as his family's residence while contributing to the occupation and Reconstruction of Texas.

In 1866 the asylum was restored, and it occupied the campus from then until 1915, while the program was renamed the Texas Blind Institute in 1905 and then the Texas School for the Blind in 1915. During this period the complex was expanded with the construction of several additional buildings. During World War I the School for the Blind was displaced by a military pilot training program, and a barracks was added to the complex. After the war the School for the Blind relocated to a new and larger campus, and the original asylum facility spent several years housing the Texas State Hospital for the Senile.

=== Little Campus ===
In the mid 1920s the growing University of Texas at Austin purchased the campus from the State Hospital system, after which it came to be known as the "Little Campus" (by contrast with the main campus to the northwest). The university built a women's dormitory called the Little Residence Hall and renovated the existing buildings into a men's dormitory. The facility was again commandeered for military training during World War II, reverting to the university's use after the war's end.

On August 13, 1974, the Little Campus was declared a United States historic district and added to the National Register of Historic Places. In 1987 the area was officially renamed the "Heman Sweatt Campus," in honor of former UT law student and African-American civil rights plaintiff Heman Marion Sweatt.

Today, many of the Little Campus's historic structures have been demolished to make room for redevelopment, but two buildings remain: the asylum's original building, now known as the Arno Nowotny Building, holds the office of the director of the university's Dolph Briscoe Center for American History, and John W. Hargis Hall houses the university's Undergraduate Admissions Center.

== Architecture ==
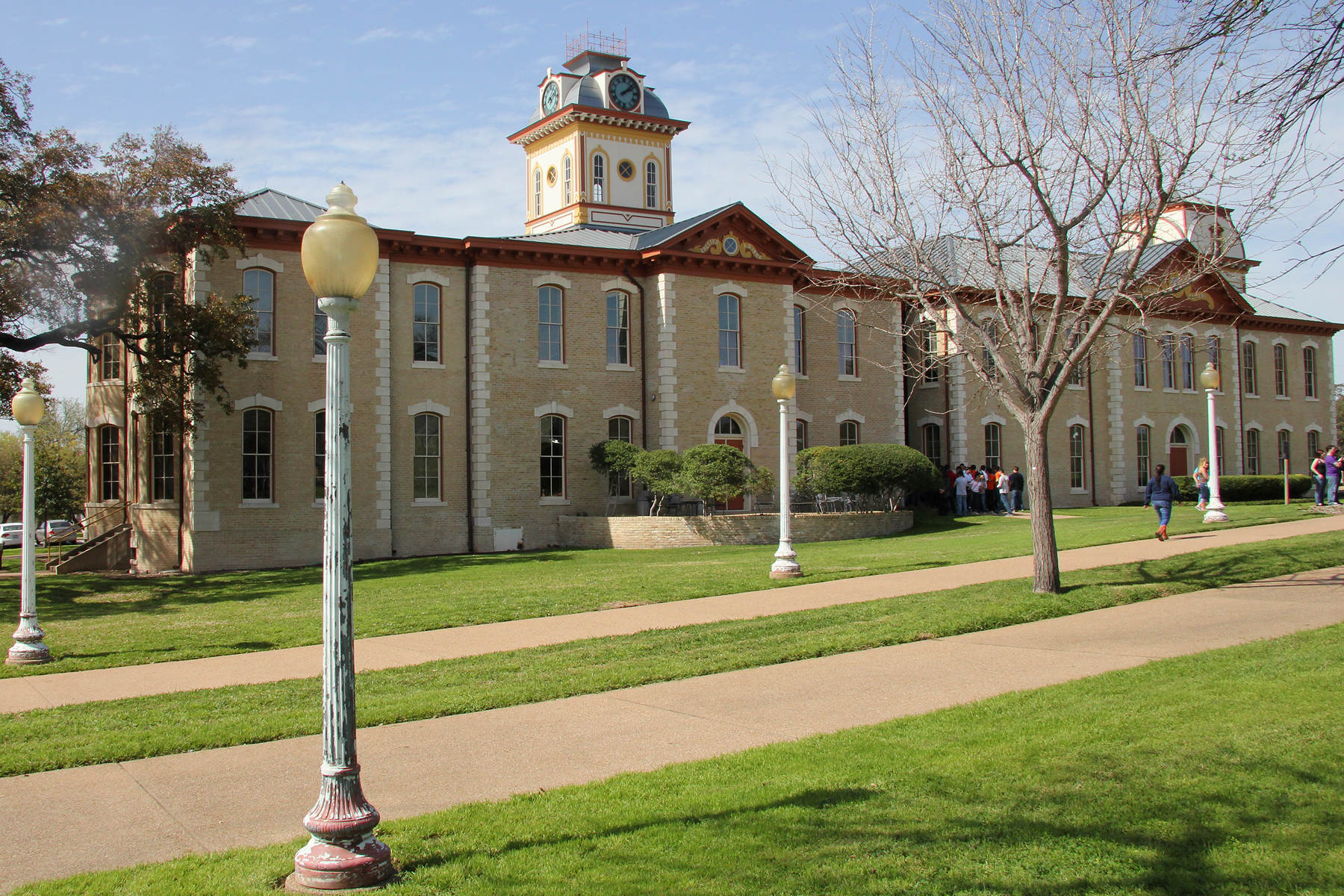
Hargis Hall, one of two historic buildings remaining in the Little Campus

The original 1857 asylum building (now the Nowotny Building) is a two-story Italianate structure of rough limestone with red brick detailing. The main facade features five sets of paired windows with limestone sills framed in brick and topped with brick segmental arches. The corners are reinforced with brick quoins, and a wide first-story portico extends to both sides of the main entry. A brick cornice marks the roofline, above which the gray metal roof is punctuated by an octagonal Italianate dome. The building was designed and built by Abner H. Cook, an Austin architect who had recently designed the Texas Governor's Mansion.

The other surviving building, Hargis Hall, is a two-story Victorian Italianate structure of tan bricks with limestone detailing formed by the joining of two older buildings, one built in 1889 and one in 1900. The many windows have limestone sills and are topped by limestone segmental arches with distinct keystones. A dark red cornice supports the gray metal roof, from which there rises a square clock tower on one side and a shorter square tower on the other.

== See also ==
- National Register of Historic Places listings in Travis County, Texas
- List of University of Texas at Austin buildings
