= Roddy Burdine =

American businessman

Roddy Bell Burdine (October 14, 1886 – February 15, 1936) was an American businessman who owned the Burdines department store chain from 1911 to 1936. A leading citizen of Miami in the early 20th century, Burdine was the son of William Burdine, who founded Burdines as a dry goods store in 1898.

After his father's death, Burdine became the chairman of the department store, leading its expansion to become one of the biggest department stores in the United States. He built Miami's first skyscraper and created the first parking garage connected to a retail business.

== Early life ==
Burdine was born in Verona, Mississippi, the third of seven children. He was the son of William Burdine, a Confederate veteran and merchant and Mary Freeman. At a young age, the Burdine family moved to Bartow, Florida where his father became a successful orange grower. William Burdine later moved his family to Miami when Roddy was 10 after a great freeze destroyed the family's crop.

== Career ==
Miami was incorporated as a city in 1896. The Spanish–American War was raging, and many soldiers were training in the area when William Burdine founded a dry goods store to cater the needs of these soldiers two years later in 1898. Roddy worked at the store as a teenager, first as a clerk, and after graduating from Miami High School became a partner with his brother, Robert Freeman Burdine, a successful Miami attorney.

Upon his father’s death in 1911, Roddy became the owner of the company. Soon afterwards, Roddy led the expansion of Burdines. In 1912, Roddy built a new store on Flagler Street, the main commercial street in Miami. Five stories high, the Burdine Building became Miami's first "skyscraper", and the first building to have modern electrical installation. Burdine traveled north to study department stores such as Wanamaker's and Marshall Field's to make his department store the most modern in the country.

By 1924, Burdines had become the leading department store in Florida, with customers coming from across the state. It had its own post office, restaurant, and car dealership. A new parking garage opened in 1923, becoming the first garage linked to a retail establishment. A new six-story building with 150,000 square feet (14,000 m^{2}) opened next to its original location in 1925. His second store opened in Miami Beach also in 1925.

=== Civic activity ===
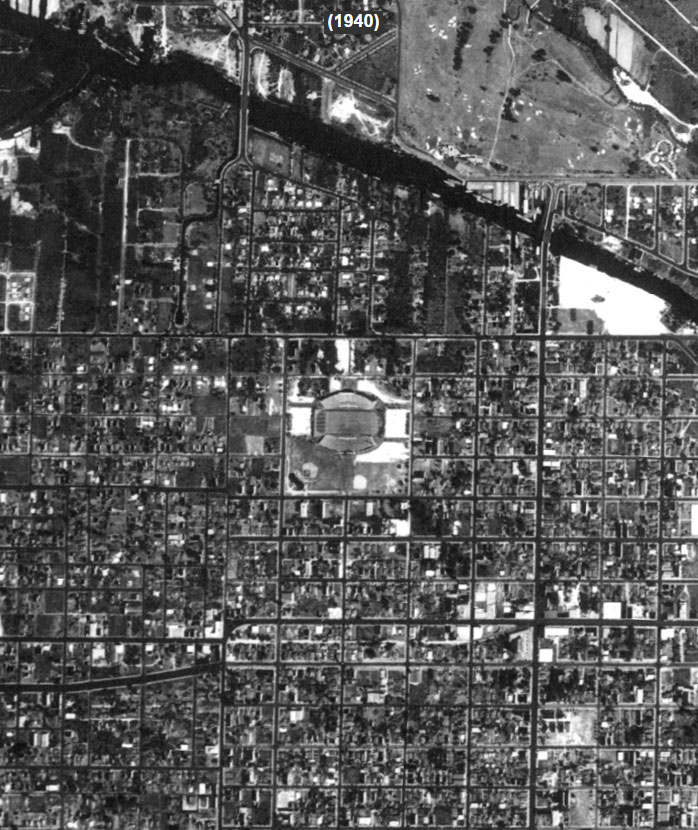
Historical Aerial view of Burdine Stadium, later renamed the Miami Orange Bowl, in 1940

Burdine was the head of the Miami's Rotary Club, and the head of the business ethics committee. After the Great Miami Hurricane of 1926, Burdine was named the head of the rebuilding committee.

In 1933, Roddy Burdine Municipal Stadium opened in what would, many decades later, become the "Little Havana" section of Miami. In 1959, it was renamed the Orange Bowl.

== Personal life ==
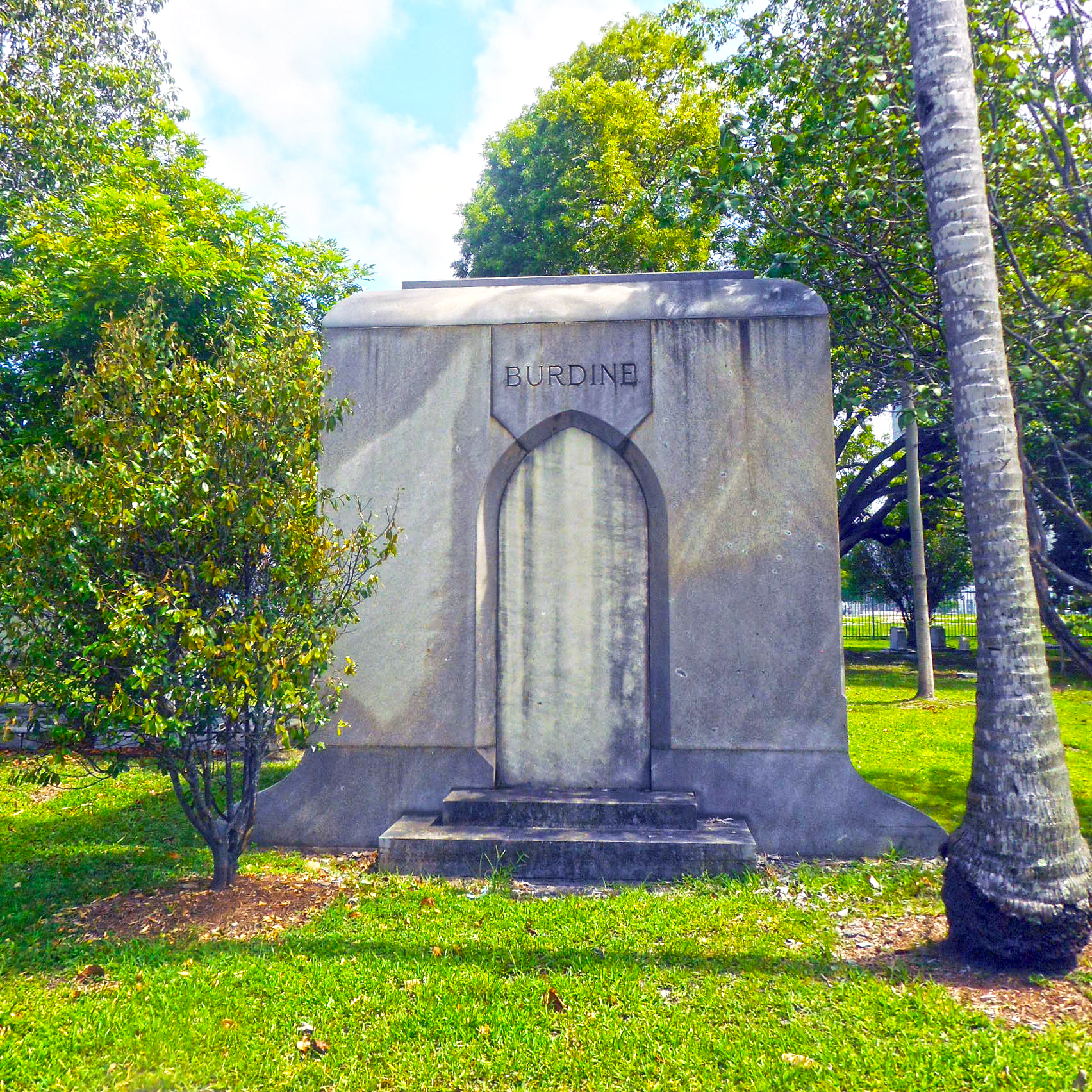
The Burdine family mausoleum in Miami City Cemetery

He married Zada Dutton (March 3, 1896 – October 15, 1969), of Statesboro, Georgia, on September 15, 1915 at her parents home. They had two daughters, Zada (November 18, 1916 – September 18, 2016) and Patricia (December 29, 1919 – July 13, 1986), and divorced in 1932. Roddy remarried on September 14, 1933 to Lillian Jenette Chatham (September 1, 1903 – May 17, 2006), a native of Windom, Minnesota, in New York City. They remained married until his death in 1936 and had one son, Roddey, who was born about two months prior to Roddy's death.
