= University Junior High School =

Historic structure in Austin, Texas

- U.S. National Register of Historic Places
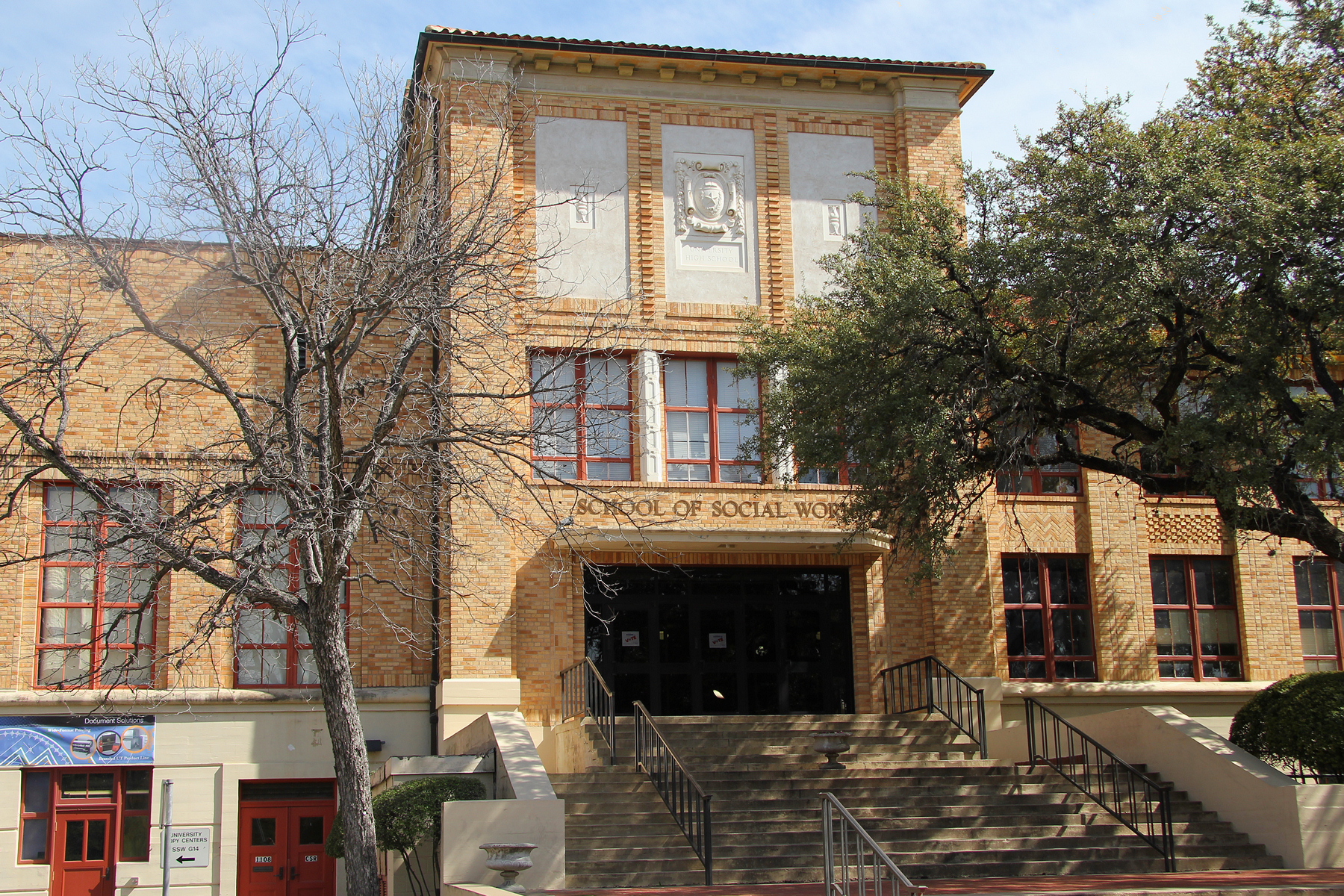

- Location within Texas Location within the United States
- Location: 1925 San Jacinto Blvd. Austin, Texas
- Coordinates: 30°16′50″N 97°43′57″W
- Area: 1.5 acres (0.61 ha)
- Built: 1933
- Architect: George Dahl; Paul Philippe Cret
- Architectural style: Spanish Revival
- NRHP reference No.: 01000396
- Added to NRHP: April 19, 2001

University Junior High School (formerly the School of Social Work Building) was a historic Spanish Revival-style structure on the University of Texas at Austin campus in Austin, Texas. Opened in 1933 as a joint project between the university and the Austin Independent School District, the school served both as a public junior high school and as a laboratory school for the university's Department of Education until 1967, when the school was closed and the facility turned over to UT. The school was added to the National Register of Historic Places in 2001.

University Junior High later gained historical significance as one of Austin’s first desegregated schools, contributing to the city’s civil rights history.

The building formerly housed the UT Child Development Center, which relocated after breaking ground on a new facility in 2021.

Following the spring of 2024, the Steve Hicks School of Social Work vacated the historic building as part of a relocation plan by the university that cited the aging building’s inadequacies and a partnership with UT Athletics, which pledged $10 million to address systemic homelessness—a commitment later revealed to lack formal agreements or specific plans.

Controversy arose when the university announced plans to demolish the building to construct a new football practice facility, citing modernization needs and proximity to athletic headquarters. The proposal sparked widespread criticism from local preservation advocates, including faculty, alumni, and grassroots coalitions such as "save the past for the fUTure", who argued that the building represents an irreplaceable cultural and historical landmark.

Efforts to save the structure culminated in its designation as a State Antiquities Landmark on July 26, 2024 by the Texas Historical Commission, temporarily adding legal hurdles to demolition plans.

However, the university ultimately obtained a demolition permit in September 2024. Demolition began shortly after the permit was granted, and the site will be transformed into a modern athletic complex with indoor and outdoor practice fields, a sprint track, and parking facilities.

While the university committed to preserving the building’s memory through photography, a documentary, and salvaged architectural elements, critics argued that such measures fell short of meaningful preservation.

The battle to preserve University Junior High School represents a broader struggle over the preservation of Austin’s history amid rapid urban development and raised critical questions about the role of public institutions in safeguarding cultural heritage. It remains emblematic of the challenges faced by historic landmarks in rapidly growing cities.

== History ==
In 1923 petroleum deposits were discovered on lands owned by the University of Texas System. New revenues from mineral royalties helped to fund a flurry of construction and renovation on the University of Texas at Austin's campus between 1925 and 1933. By the end of this period Texas was well into the Great Depression, and the Austin Public Schools program (now the Austin Independent School District) was struggling to provide adequate public education for the city's rapidly growing population with declining tax revenues. The school district's growing need for an additional public secondary school coincided with the university's Department of Education's growing interest in establishing a laboratory school where future teachers could be trained and new educational techniques tested.

In 1932 the city and the university reached an agreement to establish a model secondary school, to be built and furnished by the university but operated by the school district, with the district paying the faculty. The school was initially envisioned as a six-year secondary school that would house grades seven through twelve, to be named "University High School"; in the end, however, the city's changing school-age demographics led the district to operate the campus as a three-year junior high school serving grades seven through nine, and the name was changed to "University Junior High School." Construction on the school began in January 1933 and was completed that September at a total cost of $375,000 (equivalent to $9,330,000 in 2025). The first students entered the school on September 26, 1933.

=== Secondary school ===
The school was operated by AISD for thirty-four school years, from 1933 through 1967. From 1956 to 1957 the facility also served as a temporary home to Allan Junior High School, whose campus had been badly damaged by a fire in March 1956; both schools operated in the same building, with UJH holding shortened classes in the mornings and Allan meeting in the afternoons. University Junior High was the first public junior high school in Austin to become racially integrated, accepting non-white students beginning with the 1957–58 school year.

=== University building ===
After the 1966–67 academic year AISD closed the school, and the university devoted the building first to its School of Music and later to elements of the College of Education and the Division for Continuing Education. In 1991 the university's Child Care Center for university and state employees opened in the former UJH facility, and the School of Social Work moved into the building in 1994; these two programs to occupied the facility referred to as the School of Social Work Building.

In 1995, under the leadership of Dean Barbara White—the first African American dean at the University of Texas—the School of Social Work commissioned distinguished local artist Raúl Valdez to create the mural "Heart & Soul." The artwork, prominently displayed in the building's grand staircase, depicted scenes of social challenges, injustice, resilience, hope, and the pursuit of social justice, serving as a visual embodiment of the school's mission and providing inspiration for generations of social work students, scholars, and visitors.

The former school site was added to the National Register of Historic Places on April 19, 2001, in recognition of its significance in the development of the university's campus architecture and the history of pedagogical research and teacher education in Texas.

== Architecture ==
The University Junior High School building is a roughly U-shaped reinforced concrete building with a veneer of buff Elgin brick and a hipped tile roof, with two main stories and a partially exposed basement. The school was primarily designed by architect George Dahl (with input from the university's consulting architect, Paul Philippe Cret) in an eclectic Spanish Revival style inspired by existing campus structures. It is located near the southeast corner of the University of Texas campus, south of Texas Memorial Stadium and north of the Texas Swimming Center, which was built over the school's former sports fields.

The main entrance faces west toward Waller Creek and is set into a four-story central massing, flanked to the north by an auditorium (now called the Utopia Theater) and to the south by a former gymnasium (now used for office space). Concrete steps lead up to the main doors on the second level, above which recently added brass lettering labels the build as the "SCHOOL OF SOCIAL WORK." Above the doors are three symmetrical windows separated by decorative terra cotta panels. At the fourth level three vertical stucco panels bear floral patterns flanking the seal of the university in relief and the incised words "UNIVERSITY HIGH SCHOOL." Above, a corbelled cornice separates the brick siding from the red tile roof.

== See also ==
- National Register of Historic Places listings in Travis County, Texas
- List of University of Texas at Austin buildings
