= University Teaching Center =

- Interactive map of the University Teaching Center area

General information
- Location: 105 West 21st Street, Austin, Texas, United States
- Coordinates: 30.283048°N 97.738796°W
- Owner: University of Texas at Austin

Technical details
- Floor count: 6
- Floor area: 168,696 sq ft (15,672.4 m^{2})

University Teaching Center is an academic building located on the University of Texas at Austin campus. It is adjacent to the Perry–Castañeda Library.
