= Battle Hall =

- U.S. National Register of Historic Places
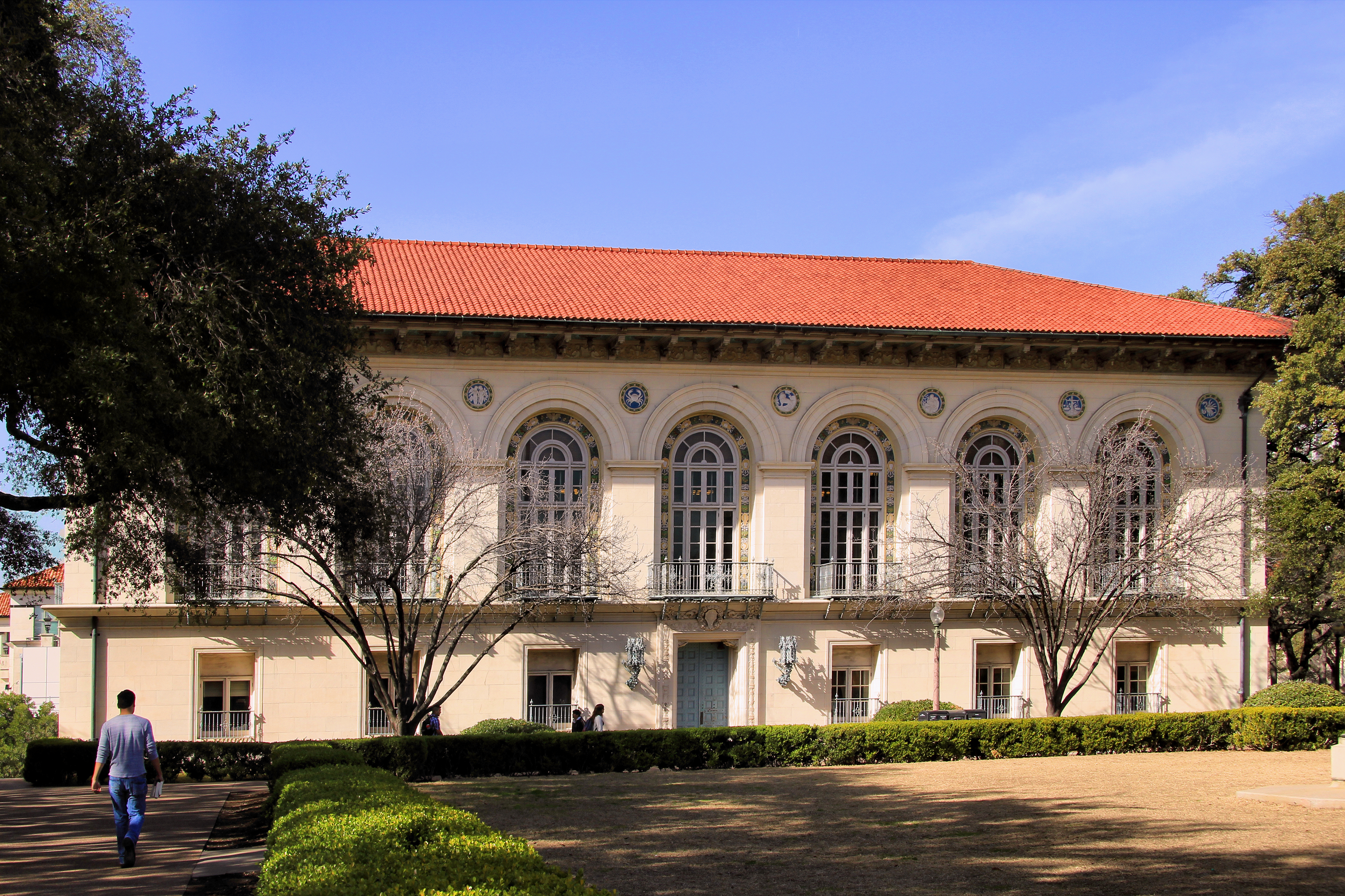
- Battle Hall in 2014

- Location within Texas Location within the United States
- Location: Austin, TX
- Coordinates: 30°17′07″N 97°44′25″W
- Built: 1911
- Architect: Cass Gilbert
- Architectural style: Late 19th And 20th Century Revivals
- NRHP reference No.: 70000763
- Added to NRHP: August 25, 1970

Battle Hall, also known as the "Cass Gilbert Building" and "The Old Library," is a historic library on the campus of the University of Texas at Austin in Austin, Texas. It is one of four buildings on campus that have been added to the National Register of Historic Places. The others are the Littlefield House, University Junior High School (now the School of Social Work Building) and Little Campus (now called Arno Nowotny Building and John W. Hargis Hall).

The building was designed by New York architect Cass Gilbert in 1911, using a Spanish-Mediterranean Revival style. It served as the main library until the new main building was completed in 1937. It now houses the John S. Chase Architecture and Planning Library, the Alexander Architectural Archives and the Center for American Architecture.

The building's design, particularly its Spanish red tile roof, overhanging eaves and limestone walls, heavily influenced the 1933 master plan developed by Paul Cret, which in turn is a design requirement for new buildings on campus to this day.

By the 1940s, the university's archival collections had outgrown their facilities. The Board of Regents voted to use the Cass Gilbert Building as a library once again, and after 1950, the expanding collections were rededicated as the Eugene C. Barker Texas History Center and moved into the "Old Library."
