= Burdine Hall =

Building on the University of Texas at Austin campus

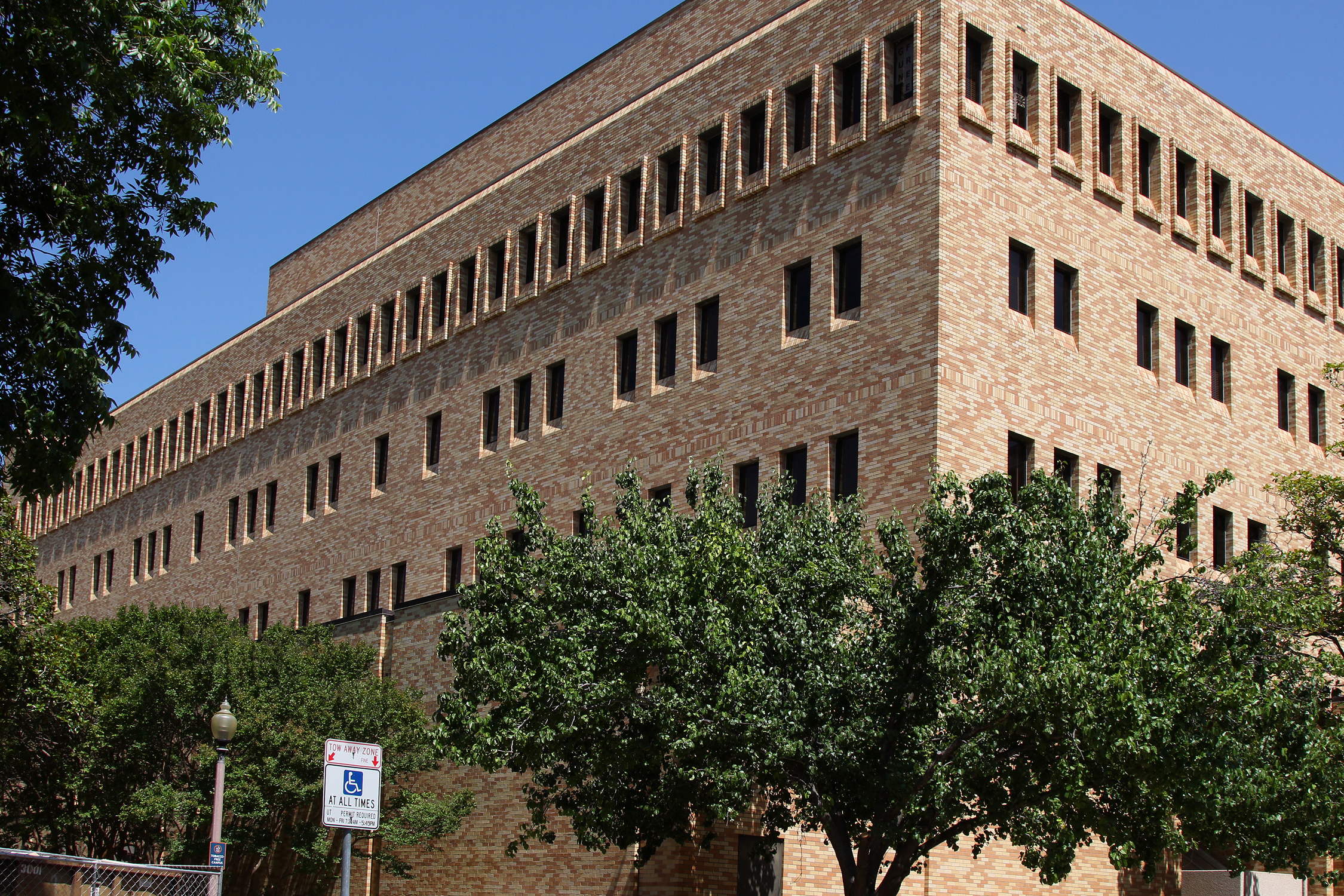
- The building's exterior in 2018

General information
- Location: University of Texas at Austin, 2505 University Avenue, Austin, Texas, United States
- Coordinates: 30.28885°N 97.73835°W
- Completed: 1970
- Inaugurated: December 14, 1970

Burdine Hall is a building on the University of Texas at Austin campus, in the U.S. state of Texas. The classroom and office building is named after J. Alton Burdine, a former dean of the University of Texas College of Arts and Sciences, and has previously been referred to as the North Campus Classroom-Office. The hall reportedly cost $2.1 million and has previously housed the departments of anthropology, government, and sociology, as well as student financial aid offices. There is a local urban legend that the layout of the building's windows was intended to resemble a computer punched card. Departments and Centers currently housed

- Department of Germanic Studies
- Department of Slavic and Eurasian Studies
- Center for Russian, East European, and Eurasian Studies
- Department of American Studies
- Center of Women's and Gender Studies
- Center of Asian American Studies
- Department of Religious Studies
- Texas Language Center
