= George I. Sánchez =

American educator and civil rights activist (1906–1972)

- Born: October 4, 1906; Albuquerque, Territory of New Mexico, U.S.
- Died: April 5, 1972 (aged 65); Austin, Texas, U.S.
- Education: Master of Science; Doctor of Education
- Alma mater: University of New Mexico; University of Texas at Austin; University of California at Berkley
- Notable work: Mexico: A Revolution By Education (1936); Forgotten People: A Study of New Mexicans (1940); Practical Handbook of Spanish Commercial Correspondence (1943); The Development of Higher Education in Mexico (1944)

George Isidore Sánchez (October 4, 1906 – April 5, 1972) was a pioneer in American educational scholarship and civil rights activism, originally from the state of New Mexico. He served on the faculty of the University of New Mexico, and held several concurrent teaching, chair, and dean positions at The University of Texas at Austin (UT Austin) from 1940 until his death. Sanchez also acted as the 13th president of the League of United Latin American Citizens (LULAC) while spearheading several landmark civil right aimed court cases focusing on equal educational opportunities for Chicano Americans and opposing the use of racially-biased standardized tests based on non-proficiency in English.

Sanchez is remembered as a leading figure in the early Mexican American / Chicano movement, which culminated during World War II, after heavy involvement with and collaboration between Chicano Americans and Latin Americans through The Office of Inter-American Affairs. In 1998, the UT Austin Education building (SZB) was renamed in his honor.

== Biography ==
=== Early life ===
George Isidoro Sánchez was born on October 4, 1906, in Albuquerque, New Mexico. During his early years, his family moved to Arizona, following his father's occupation as both a gold and copper miner. The longest settled period of time George enjoyed as a child happened to be in Jerome, Arizona, now a ghost town, but at the time was known as William A. Clark's copper mining boom town, with shipments moving hourly towards Clark County in Las Vegas, Nevada. His early experiences in a notorious mining company owned town, full of constant human suffering at the hands of a single industrial capitalist may have helped shape his gift for public service in the name of the human race. In 1921, they traveled back to Albuquerque when Sánchez finished ninth grade, so that he was able to finish out his high school career at Albuquerque High School. When he graduated, he worked as a part-time student for seven years at the University of New Mexico, all the while teaching at the surrounding public county school systems.

In 1930, Sánchez graduated cum laude from the University of New Mexico with a Bachelor of Arts in education and Spanish. After graduating from the University of New Mexico with his bachelor's degree, Sánchez received a fellowship to fund his graduate studies from the General Education Board (GEB)[A]. The GEB, created and funded by the Rockefeller family in 1902, provided a fellowship that allowed Sanchez to fund both his master's degree and his Doctor of Education. In 1931, he graduated with a Master of Science with concentrations in educational psychology and Spanish from The University of Texas at Austin. His master’s thesis surrounded racially biased IQ tests that were created for children who speak English and used them to evaluate children who speak Spanish. In 1935, Sanchez obtained his Doctorate of Education in educational administration from the University of California, Berkeley.

=== Career ===
Sanchez also received funding from the General Education Board for his position as Director of Division of Information and Statistics of the New Mexico State Department of Education from 1931 to 1935 while he completed his doctorate. Sanchez received funding on numerous occasions from different organizations, namely the Julius Rosenwald Fund to conduct field studies concerning education in Mexico. The result of this research was the book Mexico: A Revolution by Education, originally published in 1936 exploring the rural education system in Mexico. From 1937 to 1938, Sanchez served as the Director of the Instituto Pedagógica Nacional (a normal school) and was a part of the Venezuelan Ministry of Education.

Sánchez published his best-known work, Forgotten People: A Study of New Mexicans, in 1940. This book was the first to use sociological methods to document the concerns and experiences of "New Mexicans." Sánchez criticized the inclination to romanticize New Mexico and its people while at the same time ignoring the grinding poverty in the state. This book was based on his survey of Taos County, New Mexico for the Carnegie Foundation. It explored the injustices that schoolchildren in New Mexico faced in terms of literacy rates, low disbursement for education, and particularly low enrollment in schools for Spanish-speaking children. He also challenged the U.S. government to address the basic needs of the people, who he said had always been loyal to the nation.

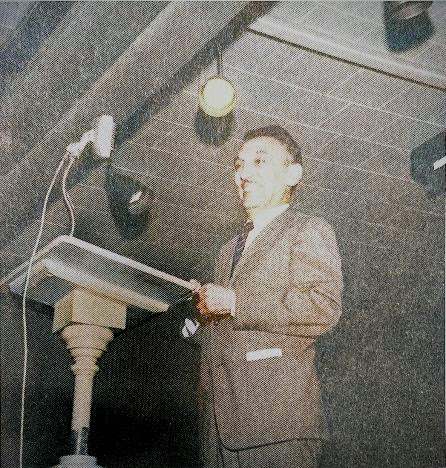

Sánchez gained his greatest accolades after 1940. In that year, he accepted a position as a full professor at the University of Texas at Austin. He was the university's first professor of Latin American Studies and later served as the chair of the Department of History and Philosophy. He was particularly outspoken in his political opinions during this time and received considerable attention for his beliefs [A]. The year after arriving in Austin, Sánchez was elected national president of LULAC although he only served one term from 1941 to 1942.

Throughout his career, Sanchez continued to conduct research. In 1946 and 1947 he conducted a survey for the U.S. Department of the Interior surveying the Navajo education. The results of this survey shed light on the injustices that Navajo schoolchildren faced. Only about a quarter of Navajo children attended school and in order to attend school they encountered rough road conditions and insufficient educational materials and establishments.

After his time serving for the LULAC, he continued to pursue activism, equity, and education for Mexican-Americans. After World War II, he assisted many Mexican-American individuals who fought in the war and chose to pursue higher education. He also assisted individuals who fought for civil rights in court. During this time he also received funding from a number of organizations including the American Council of Spanish-Speaking People for court cases supporting Mexican-American civil rights and education.

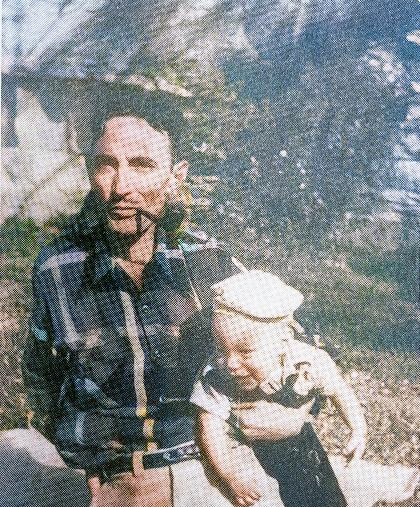

=== Death and legacy ===
Sánchez died on April 5, 1972. Among many honors in his memory, the National Education Association sponsored the George I. Sánchez Memorial Award to recognize him as the "father of the movement for quality education for Mexican-Americans"; the United States Office of Education named a work section and a room in the new United States Office of Education Building for him; schools in Houston, San Antonio, and Austin, Texas, were named for him; and in 1995 the University of Texas rededicated its Education Building as the George I. Sánchez Building.

Sánchez was a specialist in mental measurements and bilingual education and a critic of culture bias in the intelligence tests of the day. He has been called the founder of Chicano educational psychology, and is still given much credit in regards to his methodical studies on bilingual education, which are still a basis of study in the current field.

== See also ==
- History of the Mexican-Americans in Texas

== Footnotes ==
- Carlos Kevin Blanton, George I. Sánchez: The Long Fight for Mexican American Integration. New Haven, CT: Yale University Press, 2014.
