= USPS Building Bridges Special Postal Cancellation Series =

- Status: Active
- Genre: Postal cancellation events
- Country: United States
- Inaugurated: May 29, 1996
- Founders: Karen Earle Lile; Dan DiMiglio; Layton Hansen
- Most recent: May 16, 2022
- Organizer: United States Postal Service; Building Bridges
- Website: sanfrancisco.comteams.com

The USPS Building Bridges Special Postal Cancellation Series is a series of cancellations and pictorial postmarks issued by the United States Postal Service for special events that began in the San Francisco Bay Area beginning in 1996, and expanded to the Pacific Coast of the United States in 2022.

== History ==
The first USPS Building Bridges Special Postal Cancellations was issued on May 29, 1996 in partnership with Dan DiMiglio, the USPS Manager of the Pacific Area, Corporate relations, at a special ceremony unveiling the Breast cancer research stamp in Contra Costa County. 60 Representatives from non-profit organizations and coalitions were present in a special presentation with live music and government officials. This first USPS Building Bridges Special Cancellation was not unusual. It had been a pattern of Postmasters, as early as the World's Columbian Exposition 1893, for Postmasters to officiate over a special postal station located in an event important for the city.

In 1996, two additional USPS Building Bridges Special Postal Cancellation Series were issued and Contra Costa County recognized the series in a Resolution declaring October 1996 "Building Bridges of Peace Month". A Building Bridges postal Station was set up at the Health and Safety Fair Expo and another at a live concert at the Dean Lesher Regional Center for the Arts. The Mayor of Walnut Creek, Gwen Regalia, was sworn in as Postmaster for the day at the Contra Costa Newspapers Health and Safety Expo at Countrywood Plaza. The Board of Supervisors for the Mount Diablo Unified School District passed a resolution declaring Oct 1996 as "Building Bridges of Peace Month" and children from the elementary schools drew art on the theme and created a "Wall of Life" across public spaces and bank lobbies.

The Valley Yellow Pages devoted 50 pages and a front cover of its Contra Costa County Central Yellow Pages book to a Building Bridges Recognition Series, recognizing the executive directors of over 50 different non-profit organizations and government agencies in the county with the symbol and a description of the non-profit organizations program.

The Building Bridges symbol was designed by Karen Earle Lile and Kendall Ross Bean. It was first used in a video broadcast produced by Lile for the City of Oakland's KTOP TV, a Government-access television station as a promotional piece for a one time festival proclaimed the "21 Days of Light" by Elihu Harris in a Mayor's Proclamation. in the City of Oakland from Jan 2–22, 1994. Over the years, other postmasters collaborated with the conceptual artist, art director and designer, Lile, to create additional postal cancellations with the Building Bridges symbol and name on postal stations on land and on the water.

=== On-the-Water Cancellations and Postal Stations ===
Cannon Battle at Pier 39 between Lady Washington and Hawaiian Chieftain tall ships marks USPS Celebrating the 30th Birthday of the Lady Washington Tall Ship

The first on-the-water theme of the USPS Building Bridges Special Postal Cancellation series was conducted on land, at the Berkeley Yacht Club, by the Berkeley Postmaster and Leonora Clark, the Commodore (rank) of the Pacific Inter-Club Yachting Organization, a retired United States Postal Service Postmaster, paired with the new release of the Global surface temperatures Forever Stamp.

For the 100th Anniversary of the Opening Day on the San Francisco Bay in 2017, there were two Building Bridges postal stations: one in San Francisco and one in Oakland. On April 23, 2017, the San Francisco Station and the Postmaster were on the Californian of Hornblower Cruises, but the majority of the hand stamps were done at the dock of Pier 1 1/2 and for the 30 days after at the local post office. The Oakland Building Bridges Postal Station was done on the dock of Jack London Square where the ceremony was held, but the Oakland Postmaster Daryl Trujillo was aboard the Lady Washington. The Pacific Inter-Club Yachting Association (PICYA) helped commemorate the event, bringing 100 vessels consisting of yachts, power boats, ships and a fire boat.. The open and close of the celebration featured a Tall Ship Cannon Battle between the Lady Washington and the Hawaiian Chieftain.

Two years later, on April 21, 2019, the cancellation took place two days after a cannon battle on Pier 39 at Sports Byline USA broadcast studio. The actual Postmaster Ceremony with San Francisco Postmaster Abraham Cooper was broadcast on the network's 10 platforms including 200 US satellite radio stations and the 500 radio stations of the American Forces Network to 168 countries. It was broadcast to 82 million people in 168 Countries and on the American Forces Network by Sports Byline USA.

The Eureka cancellation was the first time the series moved up the Pacific Coast.

The Lady Washington and Hawaiian Chieftain had planned a battle sail in Eureka as part of the celebration, but the Lady Washington was delayed due to weather conditions on the coast and so the Hawaiian Chieftain ship itself became the Building Bridges Postal Station for the ceremony with Eureka's Mayor Susan Seaman receiving the first inked cancellation.

=== Music History Cancellations and Postal Stations ===
Fantasy Studios closed its doors September 15, 2018, as part of a trend of studio closings happening over a period of years. News of the closing of Fantasy Studios went global and recording artists who had recorded there were in mourning at its loss on radio, TV and in the newspapers.

Lile, upon finishing the last music recording at Fantasy Studios for a special KCSM (FM) Jazz Benefit album featuring Kendall Ross Bean and 60 musicians, including Grammy Award Winners, designed a new theme of the USPS Building Bridges Special Postal Cancellation, recognizing all the recordings that had been preserved over the years in the city of Berkeley, California, and then later in the City of San Francisco. The Berkeley Cancellation had a typo and read 70 years, instead of 80 years. The oldest recording found to date in Berkeley was in 1938.

==== 80th Year of Music Recording in Berkeley, California ====
USPS Building Bridges Special Postal Cancellation: Recognizing 70 years of Music Recording in Berkeley two months after Fantasy Studios closed.

Plans of a Cal Alumni Marching Band and audience as part of the celebrations were cancelled due to fires in the area., but, the ceremony happened as planned inside the Main Berkeley Post Office and was recorded on film.

==== 80th Year of Music Recording in San Francisco ====
A Building Bridges Music Recording History Postal Station was established at SF Jazz for 4 hours where the public and collectors purchased specially designed souvenir envelopes with the newly issued Gregory Hines stamp and a special pictorial postmark applied. San Francisco Postmaster Abraham Cooper gave a speech at the beginning of the concert, which was broadcast live simultaneously on the internet. Cooper then hand cancelled the Hines stamp and pictorial postmark for presentation to SFJAZZ.

The concert and ceremony was live-streamed. The event was part of Black History Month. Members of the audience received the cache with the stamp and postmark as a gift from SFJAZZ Center

The ceremony recognized San Francisco's abundant music recording history and abundance of talent back to 1938, when ethnomusicologist Sidney Robertson Cowell first recorded the folk songs of immigrants living in San Francisco. Her recordings are now part of the Library of Congress collection.

=== Building Bridges During the Pandemic ===
In 2021, USPS announced that the theme of Building Bridges will continue to cities on both the west and east coast. The first of the 2021 series happened on February 18, 2021, at the Treasure Island Museum commemorating the Opening day of the Golden Gate International Exposition in 1939. It includes the Treasure Island Museum logo, the logo of The Bicentennial of the Independence of Peru and an illustration of Peru's Tall Ship BAP Unión. Because of the pandemic, only 12 people were allowed to be at the event including the filmmakers. So, the ceremony was filmed and then broadcast to the public on an event website in cooperation with all the public sector, private sector and community sector partners involved. Speakers included San Francisco Postmaster Abraham Cooper, Consul General of Peru in List of diplomatic missions of Peru, Hernando Torres-Fernandes, Treasure Island Museum President Mike Hennahane, Pacific Inter-Club Yacht Association Commodore Patti Mangan, Treasure Island Yacht Club Vice Commodore Will Smith and Karen Earle Lile. The ceremony began with a flag raising ceremony at Treasure Island Yacht Club and then continued at Treasure Island Museum with the speakers, continued with a ceremonial sail of the Consul General of Peru on the boat Sandpiper and two days later was concluded with a Pacific Rim Unity Parade of 51 sail and power boats around Treasure Island. Seven commemorative postal caches were created for receiving the postal cancellation

=== Air Mail Cancellations and Postal Stations ===
From May 10, 2022, to May 16, 2022, 5 cancellations in 3 cities honored the 110th Anniversary of Glenn L. Martin’s flight from Balboa Pier to Newport Beach, the 1938 National Airmail Week celebrated across the nation and on Catalina Island with Glenn Martin present, and the progress of International Air Mail, at LAX airport, one of the largest centers for shipping International Airmail in the world.

== Illustration and format ==
What each cancellation has in common is the Building Bridges symbol, a black hand clasping a white hand over the water, forming a bridge with a rainbow above. The rectangle to the right of the Building Bridges symbol names the event and later in the series began to feature pictorial postmark elements. Unique Building Bridges Postal Stations are set up for each cancellation for a period of 2–4 hours, some on land and some on water. Every cancellation ceremony in the series has special events as part of a celebration.

Hand cancelling a stamp on the water is a challenge because it requires stillness of the surface being stamped so the postal worker can ink the hand stamp and place it on the envelope without smearing.

== List of major events ==
List of major events that involved a Building Bridges Special Postal Cancellation
| Date | Event | Location | Stamps / Cancellation slogan | Credits and notes | Refs |
|---|---|---|---|---|---|
| May 29, 1996 | Building Bridges of Peace Awards and Breast Cancer Awareness Stamp Unveiiling | Walnut Creek Main Post Office | Stamp: Breast Cancer Awareness Stamp; Slogan: Building Bridges of Peace | Postmaster: Layton Hansen; Speakers: USPS Corporate Area Manager: Dan DiMiglio, Karen Earle Lile, Peggy Marshburn; Performers: Kendall Ross Bean, Lissa Werson, California Theater Arts; Over 50 representatives of Contra Costa County non-profits; Building Bridges of Peace Awards presented by CCC Breast Cancer Partnership.; Contra Costa TV | |
| October 11, 1996 | Kendall Ross Bean Concerts for Kids | Hoffman Theater (Dean Lesher Regional Center of the Arts), Walnut Creek, CA | Slogan: Building Bridges of Peace | Postmaster: Layton Hansen; Speakers: Karen Earle Lile; Performers: Kendall Ross Bean; Contra Costa County Proclamation of Building Bridges of Peace Month | |
| October 26, 1996 | Contra Costa Newspapers Health and Safety Fair Expo | Countrywood Shopping Plaza, Walnut Creek, CA | Slogan: Building Bridges of Peace | Postmaster of the Day: Gwen Regalia (mayor of Walnut Creek); Performers: California Theater Arts; Contra Costa County Proclamation of Building Bridges of Peace Month | |
| April 23, 2017 | 100th PICYA Opening Day on the San Francisco Bay | Pier 3, San Francisco Bay, San Francisco; Jack London Square, Oakland | Stamp: Global: Sea Surface Temperatures Forever; Cancellation: Cruising the Century 100th Opening Day on the Bay | Postmasters: Abraham Cooper (San Francisco); Daryl Trujillo (Oakland); A Cannon Battle between the Lady Washington and Hawaiian Chieftain; Boat parade | |
| November 17, 2018 | 80th Year Music Recording History in Berkeley Celebration | USPS, Berkeley, CA | Stamp: Celebrate Forever; Cancellation: 70th Year of Music Recorded in Berkeley (typo in cancellation) | Postmaster: Candace Champion-Forbes; Music Recording History Illustration: Aneka K. Bean; Performer: Sweetfoot representing Ashkenaz Community Center.; Speaker: Mayor of Berkeley, Jesse Arreguin; An original 78 record was played with "Oh Happy Day" recorded in Berkeley in 1969. The Cal Alumni Marching Band was set to perform outside the Post Office but celebrations were cancelled because of Fires creating poor air quality. Event was filmed. | |
| February 23, 2019 | Black History Month: SF Jazz Center Family Matinee Concert | SFJAZZ Center, San Francisco, CA | Stamp: Gregory Hines Forever; Cancellation: 80th Year of Music Recording History in San Francisco | Postmaster: Abraham Cooper; Music Recording History Illustration: Aneka K. Bean; Speaker: Postmaster Abraham Cooper; Performers: Linda Tillery & The Cultural Heritage Choir | |
| April 19, 2019, April 21, 2019 | 30th Birthday of Lady Washington Journey from Pier 39 to Aberdeen | Sports Byline USA, Pier 39, San Francisco, CA | Stamp: Celebrate Forever; Cancellation: Celebrating 30 years of learning, sailing and discovering (1989–2019) | Postmaster: Abraham Cooper; Illustration: Grays Harbor Historical Seaport; Speakers: Karen Lile, Rick Tittle, Abraham Cooper, Winston Bumpus; Tall Ship Cannon Battle between Hawaiian Chieftain and Lady Washington on April 19 on the water off Pier 39.; Cancellation ceremony on April 21 at Sports Byline USA, broadcast on Sports Byline radio network | |
| April 29, 2019 | 30th Birthday of Lady Washington Journey from Pier 39 to Aberdeen | Hawaiian Chieftain Tall Ship, Eureka, CA | Stamp: Celebrate Forever; Cancellation: Building Bridges: Celebrating 30 years of learning, sailing and discovering (1989–2019) | Postmaster: Heather McTigue; Illustration: Grays Harbor Historical Seaport; Speakers: Susan Seaman (mayor); Sail on Hawaiian Chieftain with cannon shots | |
| February 18, 2021 | The Bicentennial of the Independence of Peru, Golden Gate International Exposition, BAP Unión | Treasure Island Museum, San Francisco | Stamp: Madonna and Child Cuzco Peru Christmas 2020; Cancellation: Building Bridges: GGIE Pacific Unity Station | Postmaster: Abraham Cooper; Illustration: Peru Bicentennial, Treasure Island Museum, BAP Union Tall Ship; Speakers: Abraham Cooper, Hernando Torrez-Fernandez, Karen Earle Lile, Mike Hennahane, Will Smith; Sail on 'Sandpiper', then P.I.C.Y.A Pacific Unity Parade around Treasure Island | |
| May 10, 2022 | Glenn L. Martin 1 of 5 Cancellations in a Series | Balboa Pier, Newport Beach, CA | Cancellation: Building Bridges: 110th Anniversary of Glenn L. Martin's flight on May 10, 1912, setting the Over the Water Record. | Postmaster: Rafael Ibanez; Illustration: Building Bridges logo, Glen L. Martin on his Bi-plane with pontoon; Speakers: Karen Earle Lile, Rafael Ibanz, Steven Tucker; Helicopter flight on Glenn L. Martin's Flight path, World Premiere of Trumpet Fanfare arrangement from “Break Free on Wings of Music” by Kendall Ross Bean | |
| May 10, 2022 | Glenn L. Martin 2 of 5 Cancellations in a Series | On beach near Glenn L. Martin's landing, Avalon, CA and Catalina Island Museum for Art & History | Cancellation: Building Bridges: 110th Anniversary of Glenn L. Martin's flight on May 10, 1912, First Air Mail Delivery. | Postmaster: Margarita Jackson; Illustration: Building Bridges logo, Glen L. Martin on his Bi-plane with pontoon plus Catalina Casino; Speakers: Karen Earle Lile, Avalon Mayor Annie Marshall, Avalon Postmaster Margarita Jackson; Plane Flyovers with missing Man formation to honor aviators who risked their lives for aviation progress. | |
| May 14, 2022 | Glenn L. Martin 3 of 5 Cancellations in a Series | Catalina Island Casino, Avalon, CA | Cancellation: Building Bridges: 110th Anniversary of Glenn L. Martin and 1938 National Airmail Week May 15–21, 1938. | Postmaster: Margarita Jackson; Illustration: Building Bridges logo, Glen L. Martin on his Bi-plane with pontoon plus Catalina Casino; Speakers: Karen Earle Lile, Margarita Jackson, Walter Nelson; Avalon Ball Art Deco Society of LA. | |
| May 15, 2022 | Glenn L. Martin 4 of 5 Cancellations in a Series | Catalina Island Country Club, Avalon, CA | Cancellation: Building Bridges: 110th Anniversary of Glenn L. Martin's flight and National Airmail Week May 15–21, 1938.. | Postmaster: Margarita Jackson; Illustration: Building Bridges logo, Glen L. Martin on his Bi-plane with pontoon plus Catalina Casino; Speakers: Karen Earle Lile, Margarita Jackson, Steven Tucker, Johnny Sampson; World Premiere of Hi-C's Clarinet, guitar and vocal arrangement of “Break Free on Wings of Music” by Kendall Ross Bean and Karen Lile | |
| May 16, 2022 | Glenn L. Martin 5 of 5 Cancellations in a Series | Flight Path Museum LAX, Los Angeles, CA | Cancellation: Building Bridges: 110th Anniversary of Glenn L. Martin's flight and International Air Mail at LAX | LA Manager of Customer Service and Operations: Debra Davis; Illustration: Building Bridges logo, Glen L. Martin on his Bi-plane with LAX iconic building; Speakers: Karen Earle Lile, Debra Davis, Steven Tucker, Jean Christoph Dick; Helicopter flight from Catalina Island to LAX, Trumpet solo by Chris Tedesco of “Break Free on Wings of Music” | |
