= Ricardo Musse Carrasco =

Peruvian poet, professor and lawyer

- Born: 11 August 1971 (age 54); Callao, Peru

Ricardo Santiago Musse Carrasco (born 11 August 1971 in Callao) is a Peruvian poet, professor and lawyer.

== Biography ==
Musse was born in the constitutional province of Callao. He is the son of the marriage of the Lima librarian Fermín Ruperto Musse Elliott and the Sullanera Tallán Alicia Carrasco Lazo. He studied in schools in Lima and Callao, culminating his school years at the “Carlos Augusto Salaverry” school. He has a degree in Pedagogy and Law and a master's degree in Educational psychology.

As a poet, Musse has published the collections of poems Sirodima (1990), Cinematografía de una adolescencia (2006), El espíritu giratorio del viento (2006), Eternidad (2008), Apostasías (2009), El viento de las heridas (2011), Música (2011), Lumbres primordiales (2012), Homo (2012), La voz insular (2012) and Lágrimas (2013).

As a writer, Musse has published the essays Poética piurana de las postrimerías: sus pulsiones seculares y sus rasgos divergentes (2009) and El porqué de los hipocorísticos Paco (2021) together with professor Diana Consuelo García Aguilar.

He has published the book Poética Piurana de las Postrimerías, sus pulsaciones Seculares y sus Rasgos Divergentes sponsored by the Provincial Municipality of Piura.

His essay Poética Piurana de las Postrimerías, sus pulsaciones Seculares y sus Rasgos Divergentes, is considered "un magnificente texto -y el mejor escrito hasta ahora, según la crítica especializada- que comenta el devenir de la poesía de la región Piura en los años ochenta y noventa del siglo pasado".

He was a member of the generational lineage “Ángeles del Abismo”, of the Piuran literary group Magenta and of the Chiclayano literary movement Signos.

He has participated in the Sullana Book Fair.

He is a columnist for the newspaper Tribuna and the newspaper Río Hablador.

He has been director of Educational Institution No. 14107, “Santa Rosa de Lima”, in Sullana.

He is deputy director of the INIF Educational Institution No. 48, in Sullana.

== Awards and distinctions ==
Among his awards and distinctions we find:

In 2002 he obtained third place in the XII National Education Contest “Horacio” in the poetry category with “Cinematografía de una adolescencia”.

In 2004 he obtained second place in the XIV “Horacio” National Education Contest in the poetry category with “El espíritu giratorio del viento”.

In 2005 he was a finalist in the XII Poetry Biennial Premio Copé with the collections of poems “Cinematografía de una adolescencia” and “El espíritu giratorio del viento”.

In 2006 he obtained first place in the III Northern Region Contest “Mario Vargas Llosa & Gabriel García Márquez: Crónica de una reconciliación anunciada”, convened by the Lambayeque Cultural Conglomerate with the poetic work “La celeste peregrinación de las esferas”.

In 2007 he was selected for the “IV Premio Internacional de Poesía Amorosa” organized by the Círculo de Bellas Artes de Palma de Mallorca Baleares, Spain.

In 2007 he was a finalist in the XVI “Horacio” National Education Contest in the research modality with the work “El método verde: Abordaje diversificado interáreas de la temática ecológica del primer grado para el VI Ciclo de secundaria”.

In 2019, his alma mater, the "Hermano Victorino Elorz Goicoechea" Public Pedagogical Higher Education Institute, recognized Musse as a distinguished alumnus for his literary and professional contributions.

Within the framework of the Bicentennial of the Independence of Peru, he was decorated by the Congress of the Republic of Peru for his award-winning poetic work to benefit the culture of Sullana.

In 2023 he received the National Award “Excelencia del Año” from the National Chamber of Commerce of Peru.
