= BAP Unión =

Training ship of the Peruvian Navy

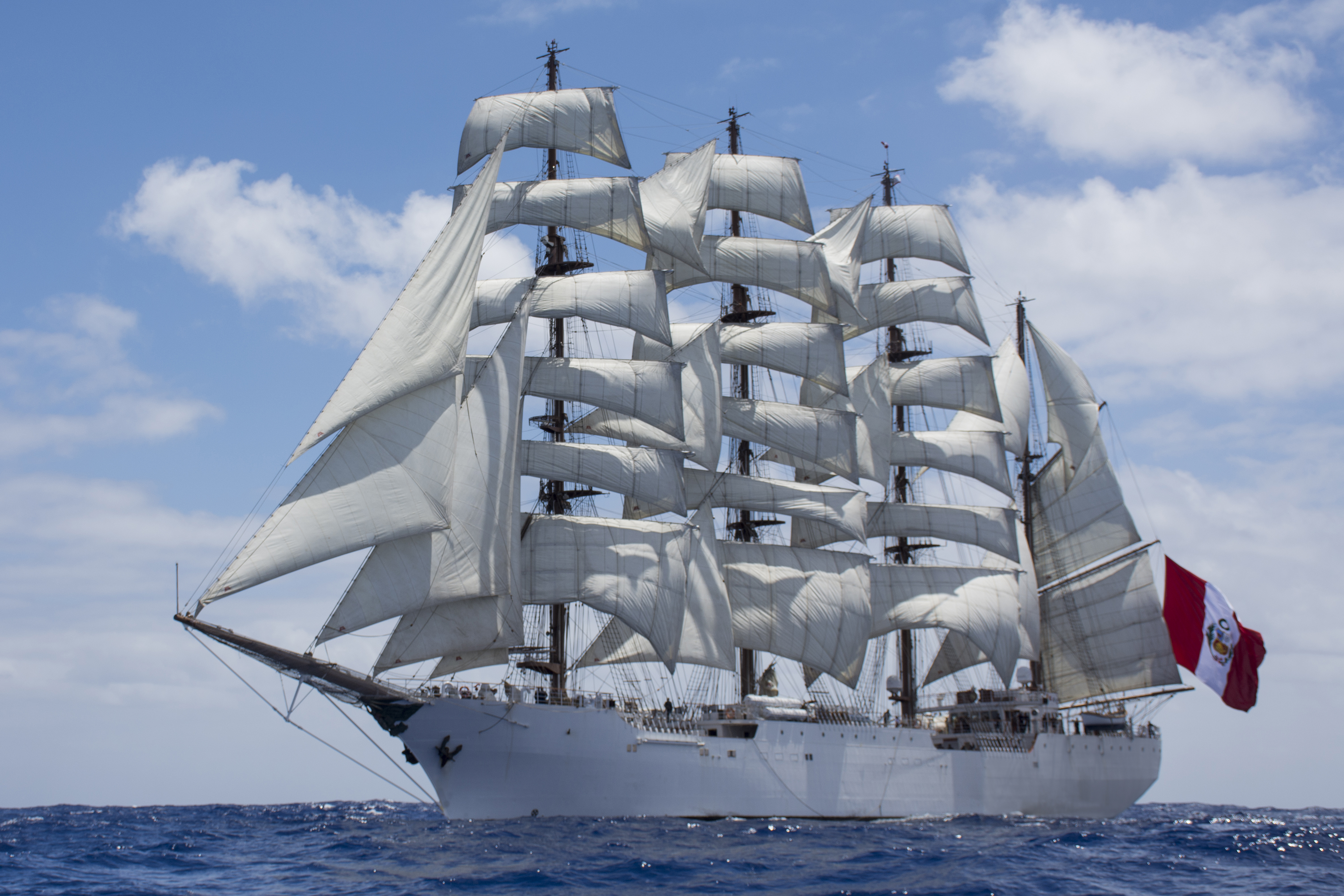
- BAP Unión or BAP United (BEV-161)

History

Peru
- Name: BAP Unión or BAP United
- Namesake: Unión (1865)
- Ordered: 23 December 2010
- Builder: SIMA, Callao, Peru
- Laid down: 8 December 2012
- Launched: 22 December 2014
- Commissioned: 27 January 2016
- Identification: MMSI number: 760105000; Callsign: OBAA
- Status: In active service

General characteristics
- Type: Barque
- Displacement: 3,200 t
- Length: 115.50 m (378 ft 11 in)
- Beam: 13.5 m (44 ft 3 in)
- Draft: 6.5 m (21 ft 4 in)
- Propulsion: Caterpillar 3516H engine, a BERG propeller, a Rolls-Royce maneuvering propeller and a Reintjes LAF-863L gearbox
- Sail plan: Four-masted barque; 34 sails, total sail area of 3,402 m² (36,620 sq. ft.)
- Speed: 12 knots (22 km/h)

BAP Unión (BEV-161) is a training ship of the Peruvian Navy built in 2012–2015 by Shipyard Marine Industrial Services of Peru, known as SIMA. It is a four-masted, steel-hulled, class "A" barque, composed of 38 steel modules. It has a total length (including bowsprit) of 115.50 m (378 ft 11 in); a beam of 13.50 m (44 ft 3 in); a draft of 6.50 m (21 ft 4 in); an air draft of 53.50 m (175 ft 6 in); a displacement of 3,200 tonnes; a speed of 12 knots (22 km/h) and a crew of 250 officers and trainees. The ship's name honors a Peruvian corvette that took part in the first stage of the 1879–1883 War of the Pacific as part of a naval squadron under the command of Miguel Grau, a hero of the Peruvian Navy.

Like other similar ships, Unión has been conceived not only for training purposes, but also to be a sailing ambassador for its home country. Due to its features and dimensions, it has been considered (as of the date it was commissioned) the largest sail vessel in Latin America.

== History ==
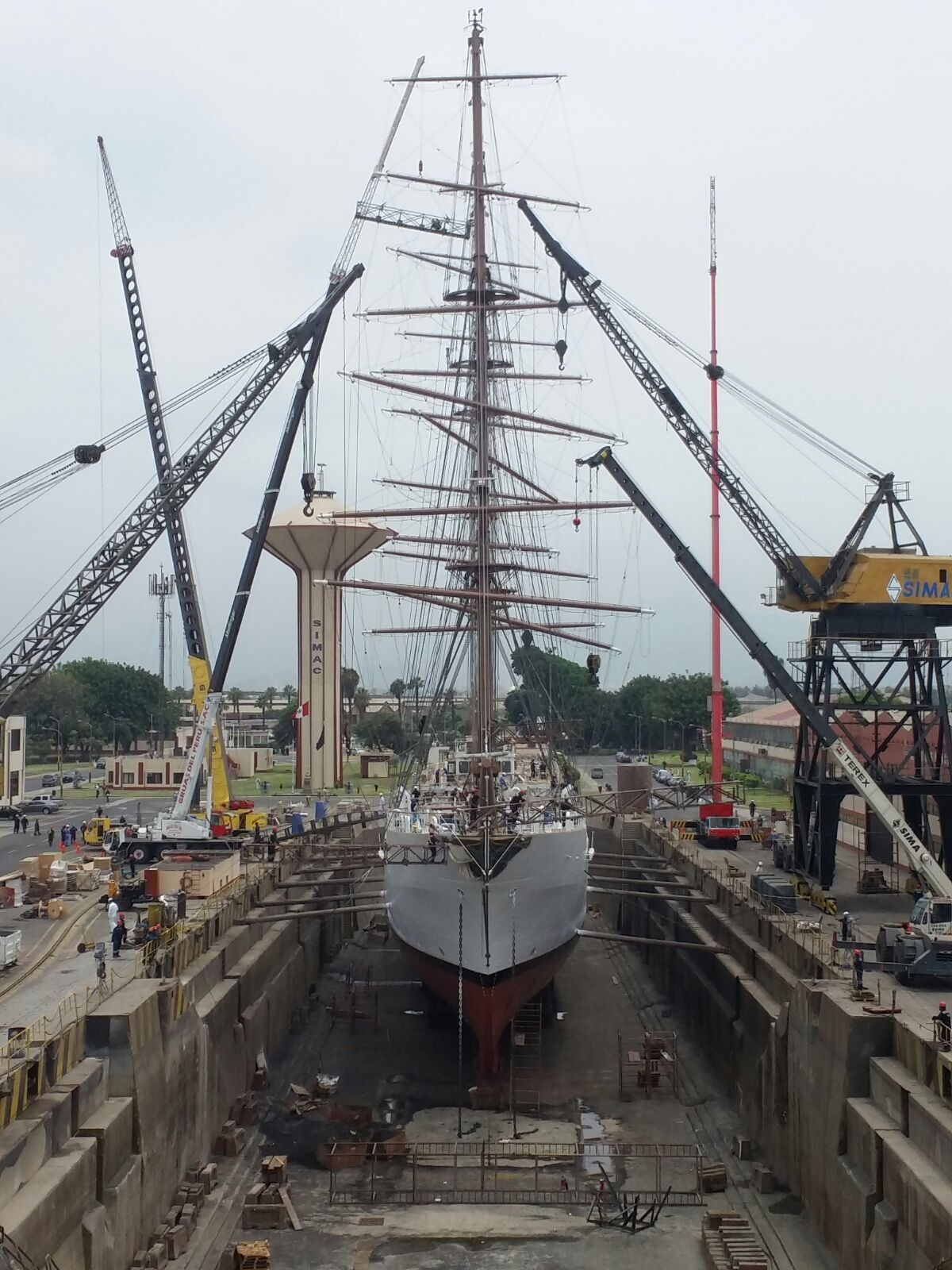
Under construction in dry dock at SIMA

For a long time, the Peruvian Navy desired a training ship for instruction of its cadets. Accordingly, the Peruvian government enacted 1985 Law N° 24094, which declared as a public necessity the navy having this kind of ship. However, due to the economic crisis of debt and hyper-inflation Peru suffered at the end of the 1980s, and later for public spending restraints, the project was postponed.

Eventually, in 2010 the project was approved and the construction was authorized. In 2012 the Peruvian government announced its decision to order the ship's construction to the Shipyard Marine Industrial Services of Peru, known as SIMA; in cooperation with the Government of Spain, through the contractors Cypsa Ingenieros Navales and Navantia, which were responsible for the ship's structural design. The government named the ship Union to honor a Peruvian corvette that took part in the first stage of the 1879–1883 War of the Pacific as part of a naval squadron under the command of Miguel Grau, a hero of the Peruvian Navy. On December 8, 2012 Unión's construction began with a keel laying ceremony in the presence of Peruvian president Ollanta Humala. The hull was finished two years later and the ship was launched on December 22, 2014.

In June 2015, the ship received its masts and propeller; and the interior fitout began in charge of contractors Acopafi and MO Contract. Also, according to an agreement between SIMA and Navantia, the ship was provided with an "Integrated Control System Platform, Navigation and Communications".

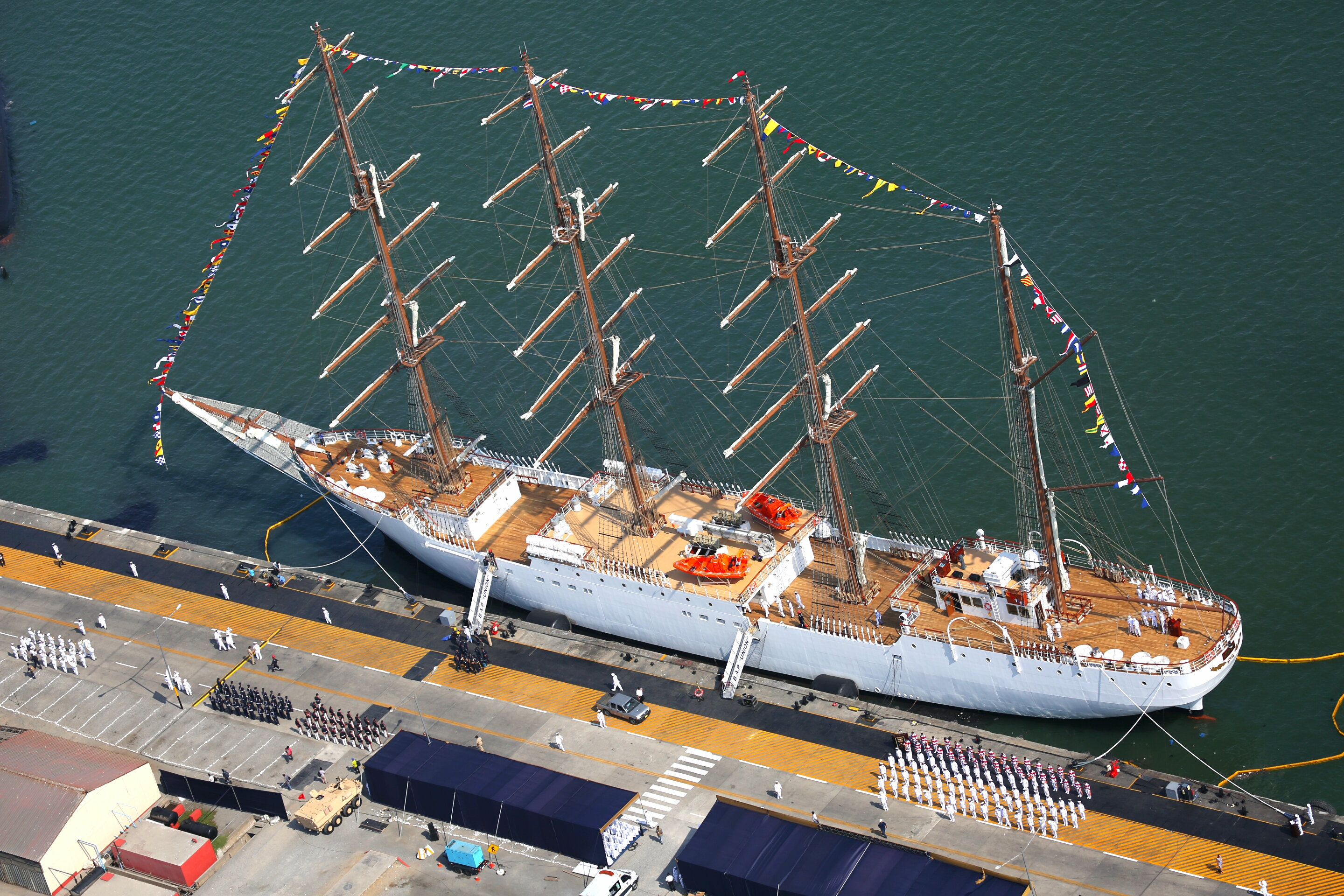
Commissioning ceremony

While the ship was under construction, the Peruvian government arranged training for the future Unión's crew with the help of an instructor from the Spanish Navy and by sending personnel to serve on training ships of other countries, such as the Mexican sailing ship ARM Cuauhtémoc. Also, a Peruvian delegation was sent to take part in maintenance and repair works on Colombian sailing ship ARC Gloria.

On January 27, 2016 BAP Unión was commissioned in an official flag raising ceremony held on its deck witnessed by the President Ollanta Humala, Jakke Valakivi, the Minister of Defense and Admiral Edmundo Deville, the Commander of the Navy. Captain Gianfranco Polar Figari was named to be the first captain of the ship, who conducted the sea trials of the vessel in June 2016.

BAP Unión's first training cruise abroad began on July 27, 2016. The set sailing ceremony was attended by Pedro Cateriano, the President of the Council of Ministers, Jakke Valakivi, the Minister of Defense, Ana María Sanchez, the Minister of Foreign Affairs, and Admiral Edmundo Deville, the Commander of the Navy, among other authorities.

As a sailing ambassador promoting the Peruvian nation brand, since 2020 the ship flies a sail with the Peru brand logo and visits national and international ports providing information about Peruvian flagship products like pisco, asparagus, tangerines, paprika, anchovies, among others, as well as Peruvian tourist destinations.

== Characteristics ==
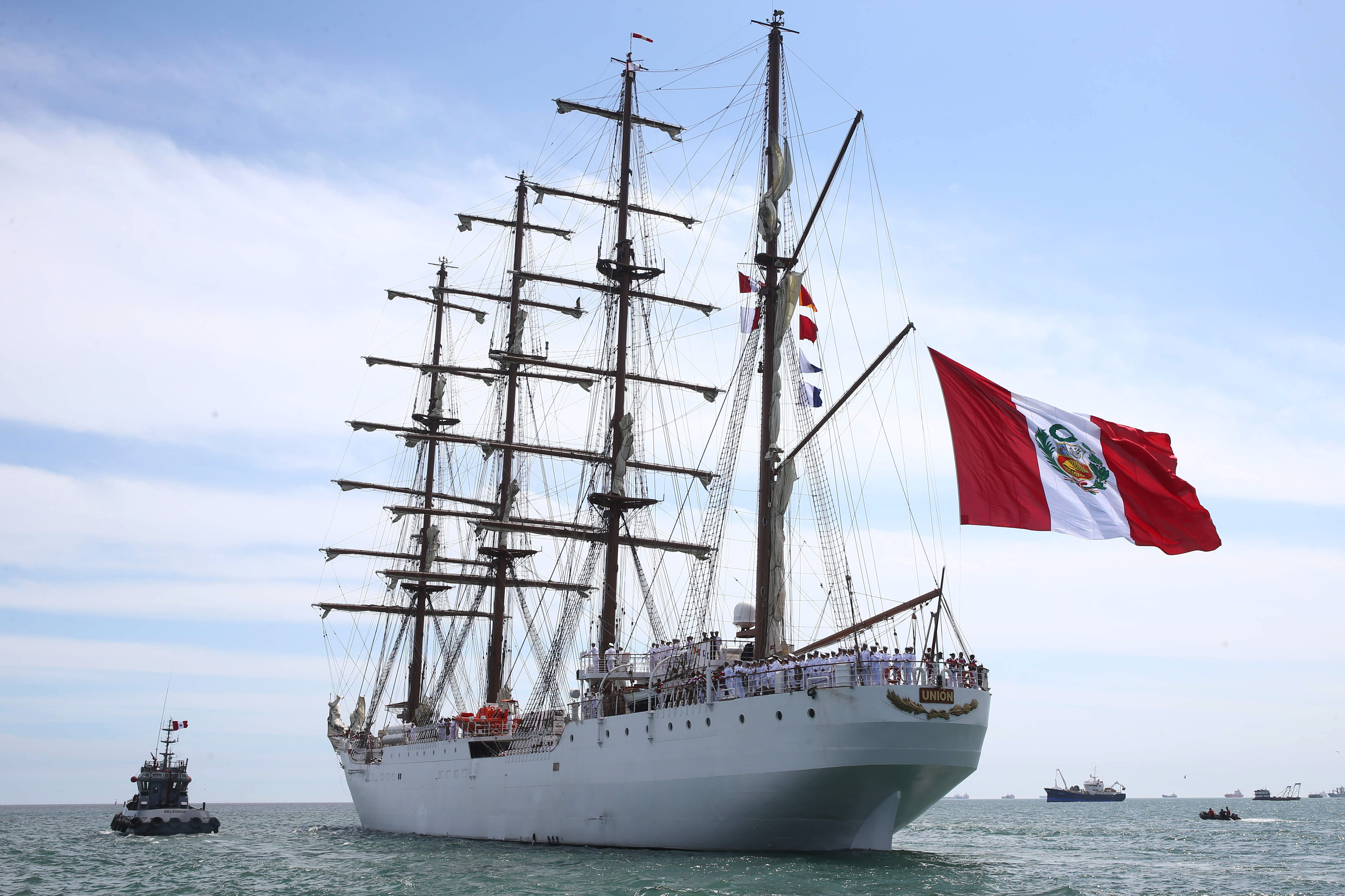
BAP Unión in Callao, Perú

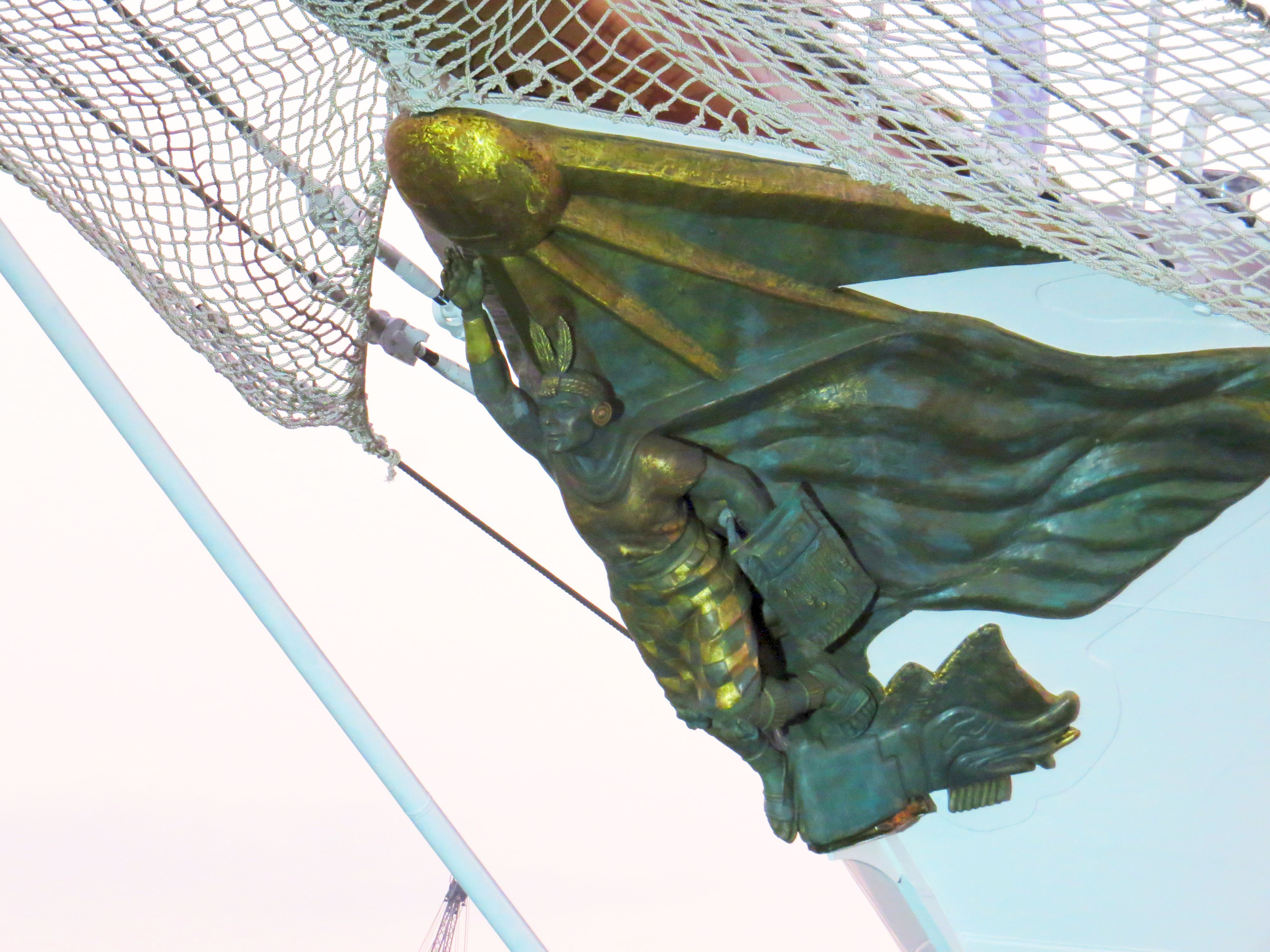
Figurehead

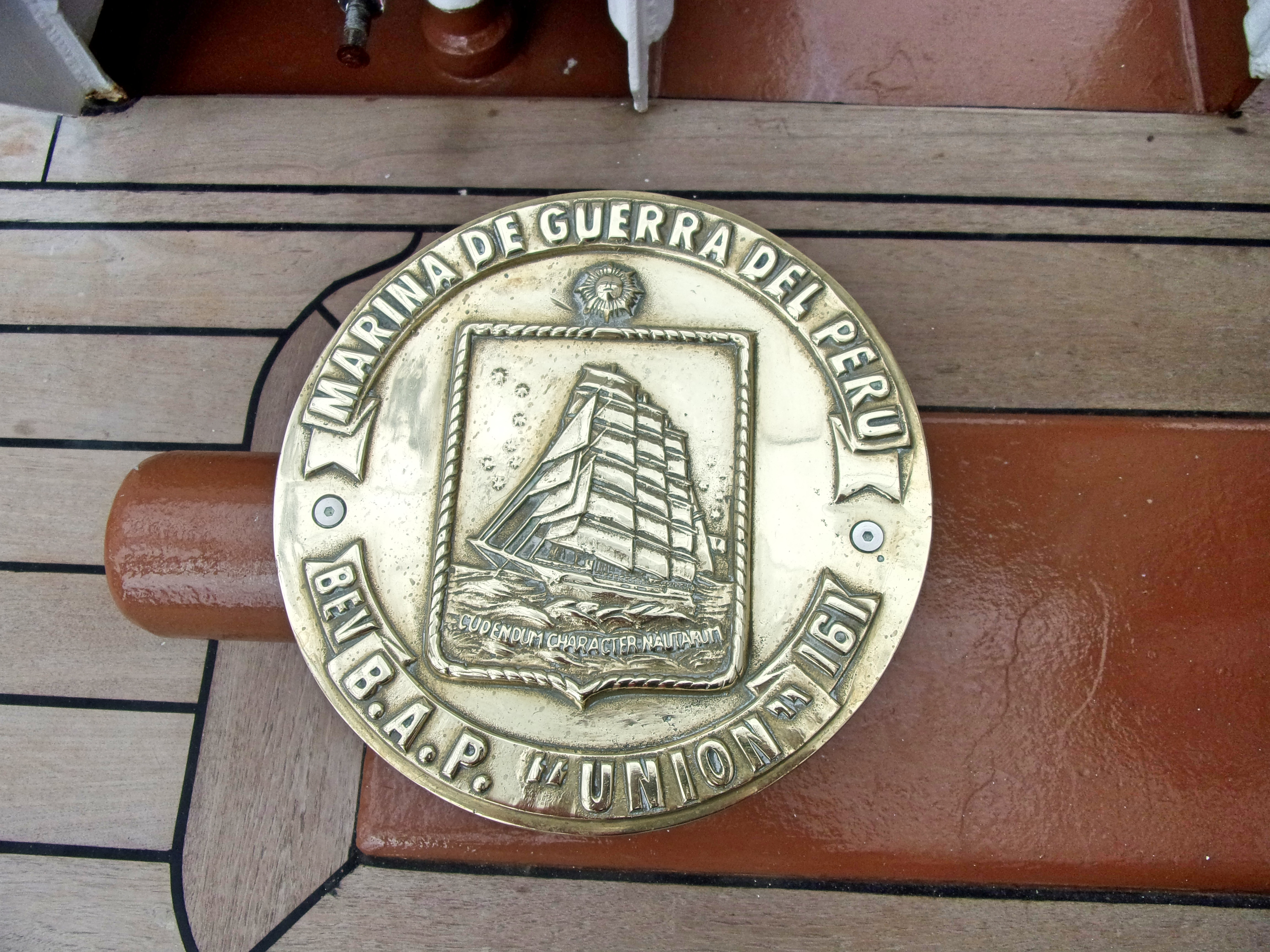
Escutcheon

Although the main purpose of Unión is to serve as a training ship for the Peruvian Navy, it has also been conceived to be a sailing ambassador for her home country. Due to its features and dimensions, it has been considered (as of the date it was commissioned) the largest sail vessel in Latin America.

=== Specifications ===
BAP Unión is a four-masted barque with a hull composed of 38 steel modules. It has a total length (including bowsprit) of 115.50 m (378 ft 11 in); a beam of 13.50 m (44 ft 3 in); a draft of 6.50 m (21 ft 4 in); an air draft of 53.50 m (175 ft 6 in); a displacement of 3,200 tonnes; a speed of 12 knots (22 km/h) and a crew of 250 officers and trainees.

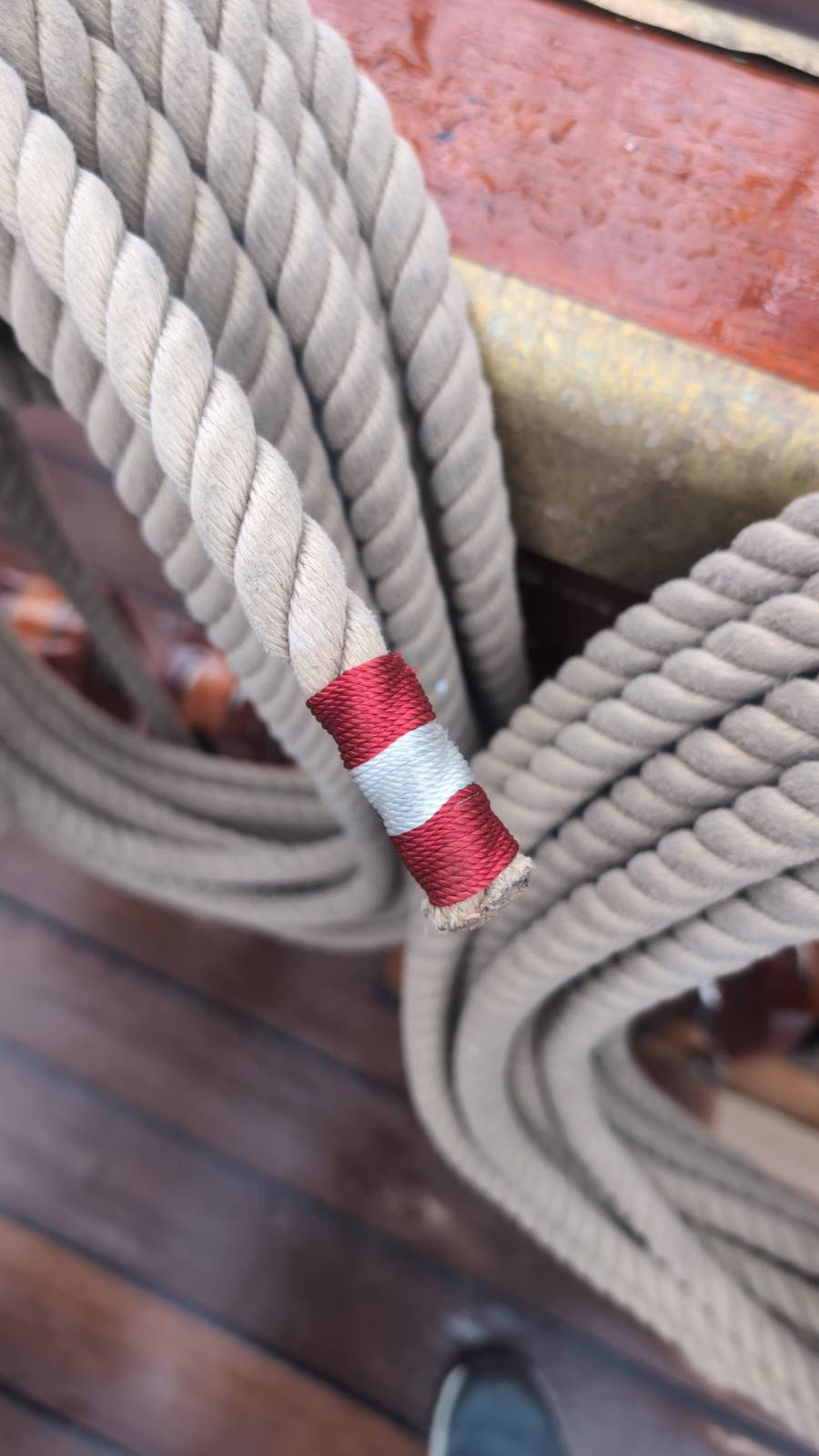
All the lines on the ship have a whipping knot in the colors of the flag of Peru

The ship's propulsion is supported by a diesel Caterpillar 3516H engine, a BERG propeller, a Rolls-Royce maneuvering propeller and a Reintjes LAF-863L gearbox. Its sail rig is composed of 34 sails from sailmaking company Wienecke, arranged in bowsprit mast (5), foresail mast (9), mainmast (9), mizzenmast (8) and jiggermast (3), with a total sail area of approximately 3,402 m^{2} (36,620 sq ft).

BAP Unión is also equipped with AZCUE pumps for different applications including: BT-IL45D4-F, BT-HM25D4, KL30S40, LN-VP-40-160, CA-50-3, CA-40-1, MO-11/20, MO-19/20.

=== Figurehead ===
The ship's figurehead was made of bronze by the Peruvian sculptor Pilar Martínez Woodman, and it features several symbols of the Inca culture that previously existed in what is now Peru. As the main element it shows the image of the Sapa Inca (emperor) Tupac Yupanqui, known as "The Shining", who appears with his right arm raised to the image of the Inca sun god Inti; and who is placed over a representation of the archeological artefact known the twelve-angled stone. The Sapa Inca wears a checkered cloth and a cape that depicts ocean waves. He also wears two puma heads (the puma was a sacred animal in Inca culture) as knee guards. His head is adorned with the mascapaicha (the Inca crown); and the shield he holds has the image of two rhombuses that represent the Inca Empire, known as Tawantinsuyu.

=== Escutcheon ===
Unión's escutcheon depicts the ship sailing over the ocean with the motto Cudendum Character Nautarum ("forging sailors' character") written in Latin below. It also contains an image of the sky with representations of the constellations Ursa Minor and Crux. Over the escutcheon is the image of a bright sun and the legend "Marina de Guerra del Perú" (Navy of Peru) and below the name and number of the ship.

=== Interior equipment for training ===
Due to its use as a training ship, Unión's interior includes an auditorium, a library, a computing platform and classrooms to instruct cadets in astronomic navigation; meteorology; oceanography; hydrography; and naval operations and maneuvers.

== Voyages and trophies ==
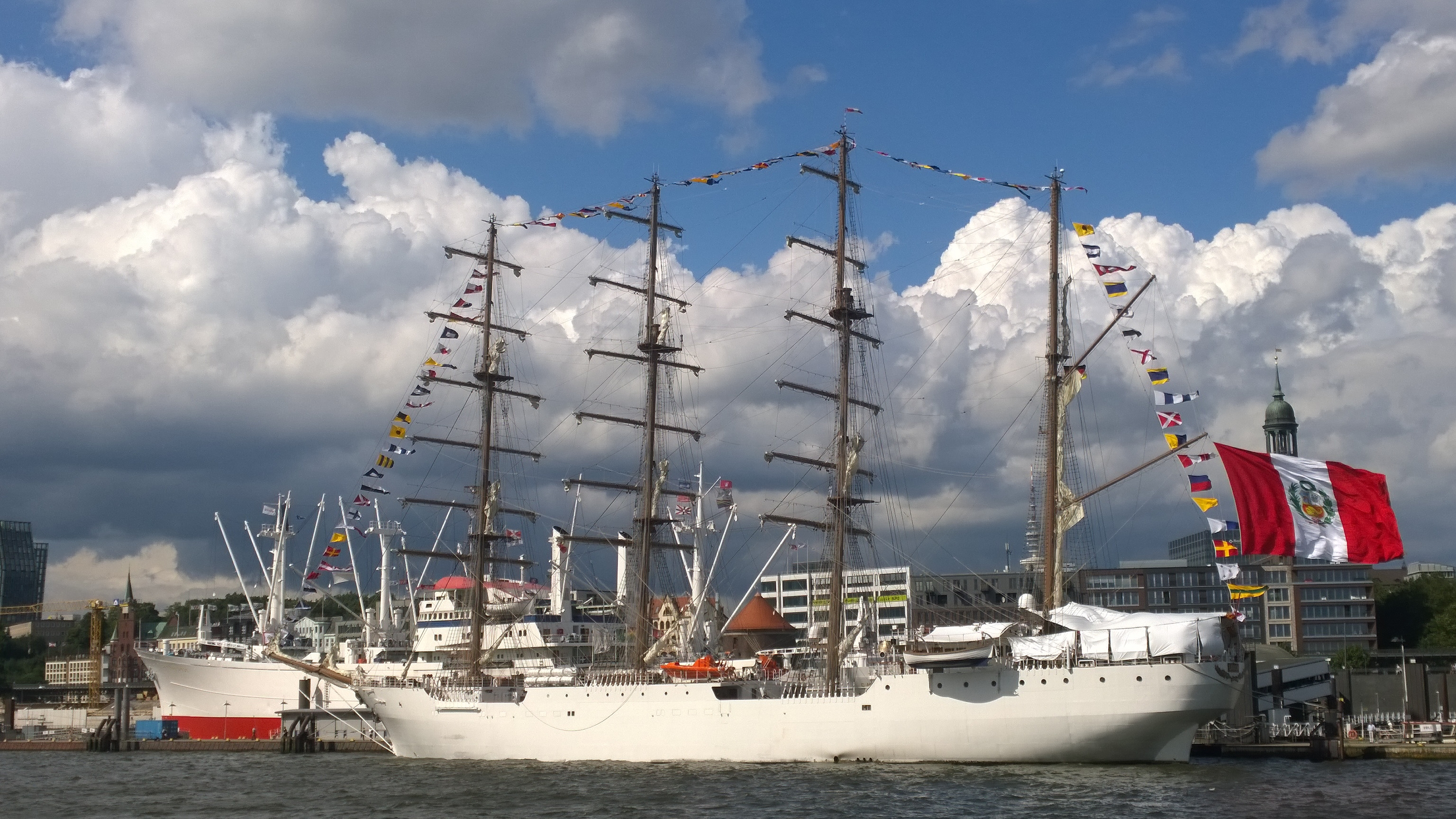
In the Port of Hamburg on 3 August 2017

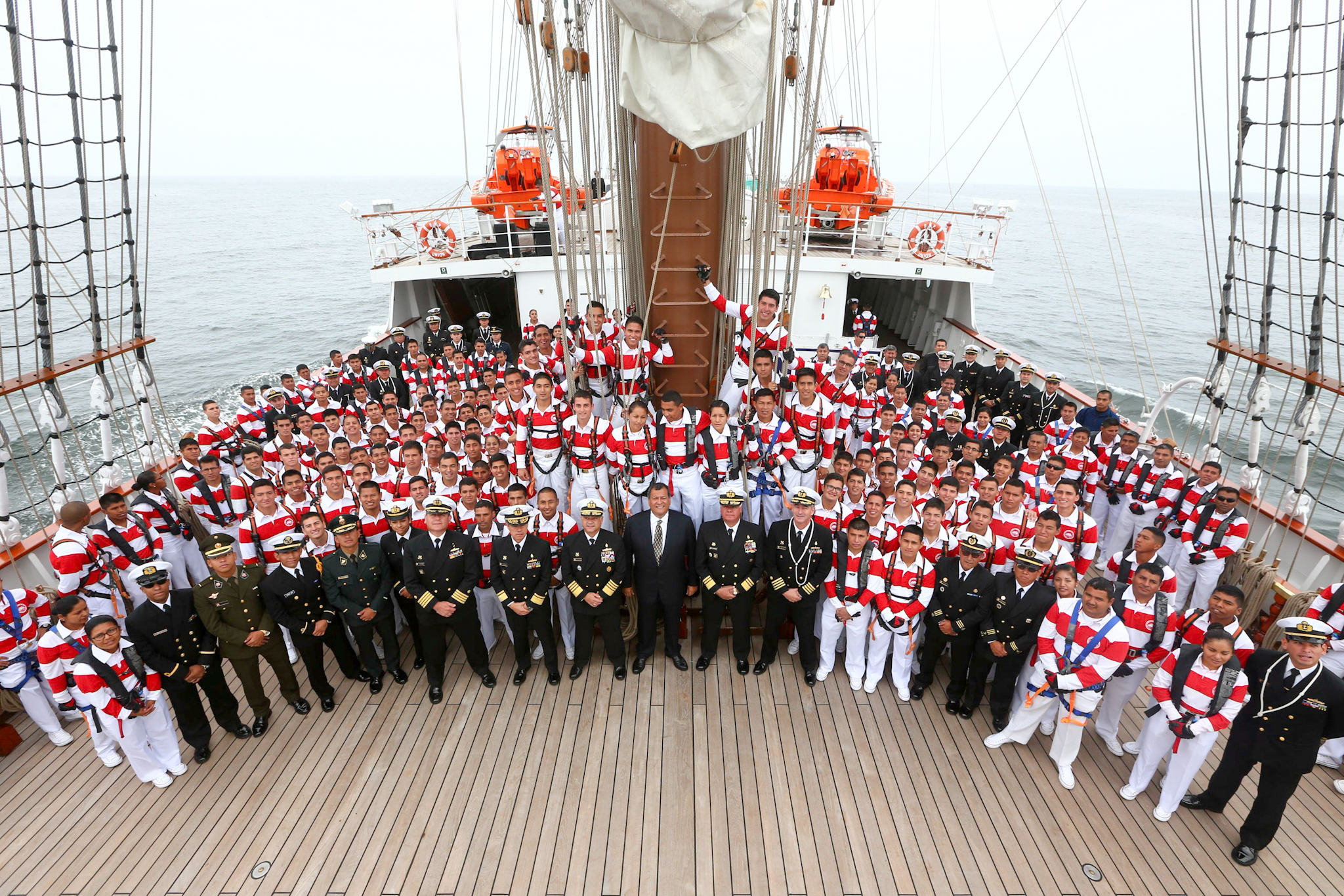
Unión's crew with Peruvian defense minister in November 2017

Unión's first training cruise abroad was in July 2016. The journey, which was officially named as "VIEX 2016", acronym in Spanish of "Viaje de Instrucción al Extranjero 2016" (Training Trip Abroad 2016), had a length of three months, in which the Unión crew visited the ports of Guayaquil (Ecuador), Cartagena (Colombia), San Juan (Puerto Rico), La Habana (Cuba), Miami (United States), Veracruz (Mexico) and Balboa (Panama), before to returning to its base in Callao. The crew and navy cadets received instruction in naval exercises and maneuvers, as well as showing people abroad several elements of Peruvian culture.

In 2017 the Peruvian Navy organized the "VIEX 2017". As a part of this journey, Unión participated in Rendez-Vous 2017 Tall Ships Regatta, a series of races organized by Sail Training International, where the vessel won the race from Boston to Charlottetown (Gulf of Saint Lawrence) in Canada. In this regatta the ship covered more than 450 nautical miles (830 km). In July 2017 Unión docked in South Quay in Canary Wharf, London, on a trip to foster Anglo-Peruvian relations, the visit coinciding with Peru's national day on 28 July. The Peruvian Ambassador to the Court of St James's attended the vessel.

In 2018 Unión participated in the event "Velas Latinoamérica 2018" (Sails Latin America), an international sailing regatta held every four years for ships from some Latin American countries. As part of this, the vessel visited several ports including Valparaiso, Guayaquil, Balboa, Curazao, Cartagena and Veracruz.

In 2023 the Unión was awarded with the Boston Teapot Trophy for part of their voyage from Callao and Tahiti by sailing 1,261 nautical miles with an average speed of 10.71 kts between 21:00 GMT 05 July and 01:00 GMT 11 July 2023.The winning voyage took place during the start of the Peruvian Naval ship’s circumnavigation of the world.

In 2026, the Unión took part in America's Sail 250.. The vessel was open to tours along with various tall ships from other nations.

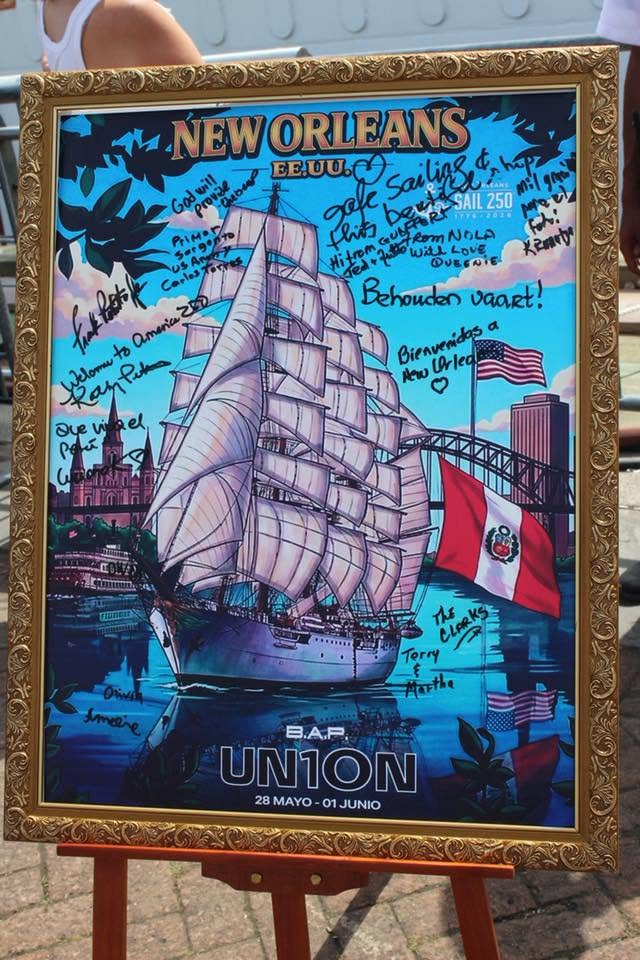
A poster signed by visitors during the New Orleans stop of Sail 250

== United States Postal Service honors BAP Unión ==
Peru figured prominently in the history of the city of San Francisco with a strong relationship between San Francisco and Lima, Peru. The United States Postal Service issued a USPS Building Bridges Special Postal Cancellation Series on Feb 18, 2021 as part of a ceremony to celebrate The Bicentennial of the Independence of Peru. commemorating the Opening Ceremony on Feb 18, 1939 of the Golden Gate International Exposition on Treasure Island, San Francisco, California, United States of America. The pictorial special postal cancellation features an illustration of the Peruvian Tall Ship BAP Unión, Treasure Island Museum logo and the official logo for Peru Bicentario 2021. The signatory image of Building Bridges, which marks all USPS Building Bridges Special Postal Cancellations, was created by Karen Earle Lile and Kendall Ross Bean in 1994 and first used by USPS in 1996.

The General Consul of Peru in San Francisco on Feb 19, 1939, Fernando Berckemeyer spoke at the Opening Ceremony of the Golden Gate International Exposition, also known as GGIE. As a commemoration of GGIE On Feb 18, 2021, the General Consul of Peru in San Francisco, Hernando Torres-Fernández, spoke at the USPS Building Bridges Special Cancellation of that ceremony, which was filmed for broadcast internationally on special event site.

== See also ==
- List of large sailing vessels
