= Bicentennial of the Independence of Peru =

200th anniversary of Peru

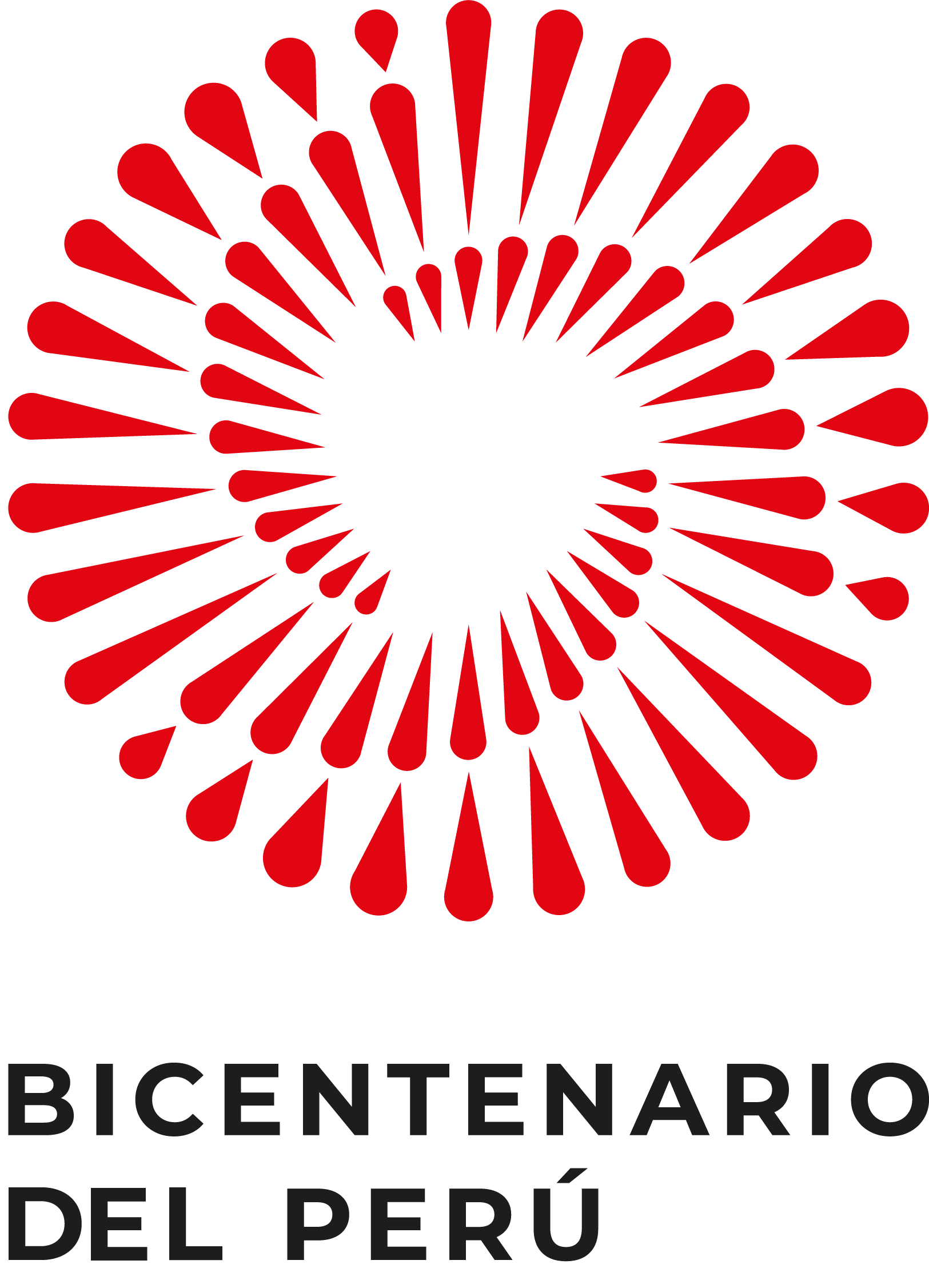
- Date: 28 July 2021
- Location: Peru
- Previous event: Centennial (1921); Sesquicentennial (1971)
- Major events: 200th anniversary of the adoption of the Declaration of Independence
- Organiser: National Bicentennial Commission

The Bicentennial of the Independence of Peru (Spanish: Bicentenario de la Independencia de Perú) occurred on 28 July 2021. Its celebration commemorated 200 years since Peru's proclamation of Independence. The celebration consisted of a mix of local, state, and national activities that were planned since 2016. On 8 August 2016, the Prime Minister of Peru announced the creation of the Organizing Commission for the Commemoration of the Bicentennial of the Independence of Peru.

== Background information ==
=== Independence of Peru ===
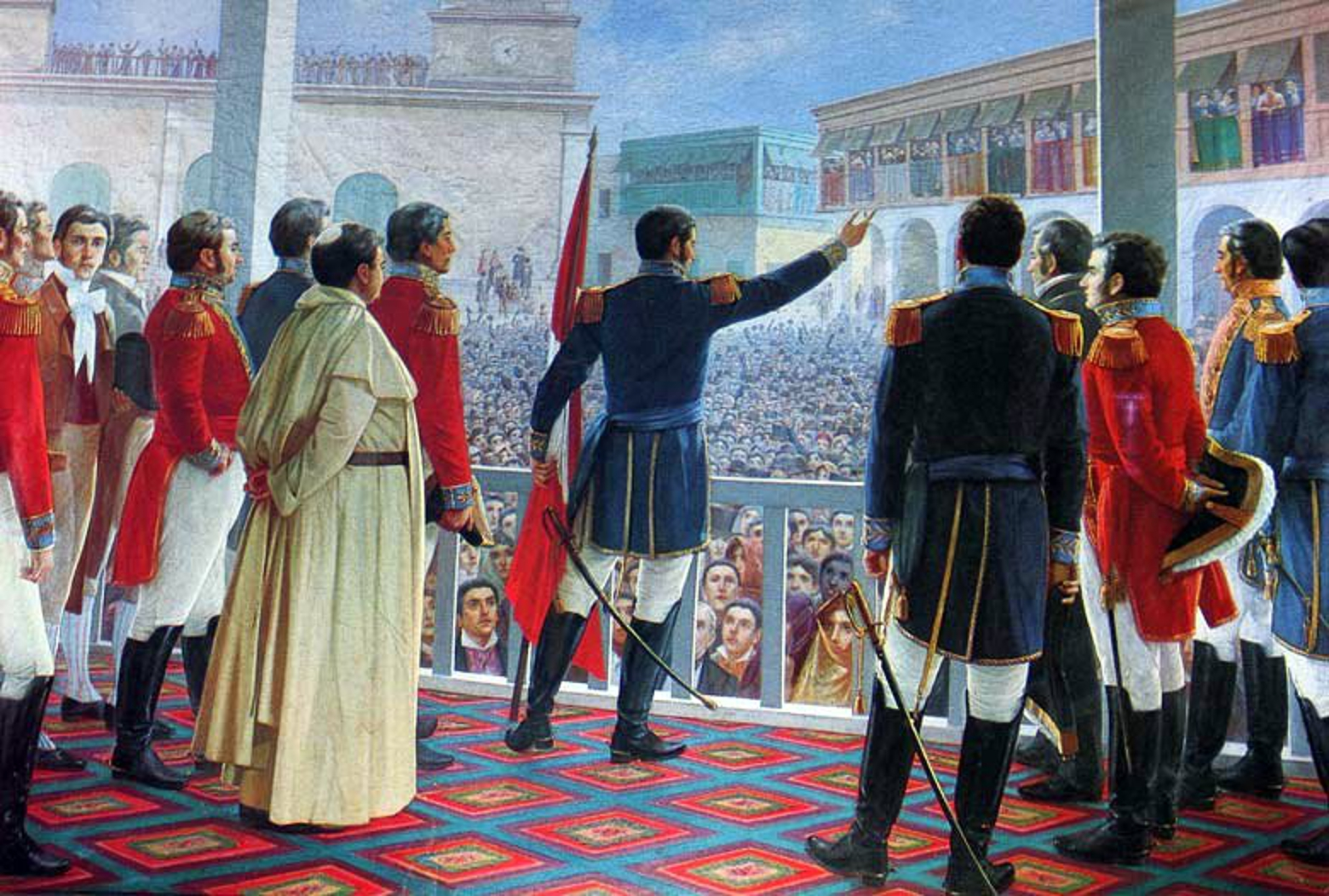
Proclamation of the Independence of Peru in 1821. Oil by Juan Lepiani.

The Independence of Peru was a historic process.

A series of uprisings and warlike conflicts led to the emergence of the Peruvian Republic, first as an independent state of the Spanish monarchy, and second to the breaking of all ties with it. Consequentially, the Viceroyalty of Peru was dissolved.

One of the first uprisings that questioned Spanish power over the Viceroyalty of Peru was the Rebellion of Tupac Amaru II in 1780. Royalist forces squashed this initial uprising, but it would lay the groundwork for further rebellion. Subsequently, insurrections such as the Tacna Rebellion of 1811 and the Cuzco Rebellion of 1814 further radicalized the population. Because Spanish colonial power in America was mainly concentrated in the Viceroyalty of Peru, the intervention of foreign forces was necessary for the revolution to be successful. The Liberating Expedition of Peru, commanded by General José de San Martin, was one such intervention. Martin's forces were successful in occupying the capital city of Lima in 1820, and Peruvian Independence was declared on 28 July 1821. In 1824, the independence process was finalized with the help of Simón Bolívar and the signing of the Capitulation of Ayachucho in 1824.

=== First centennial ===
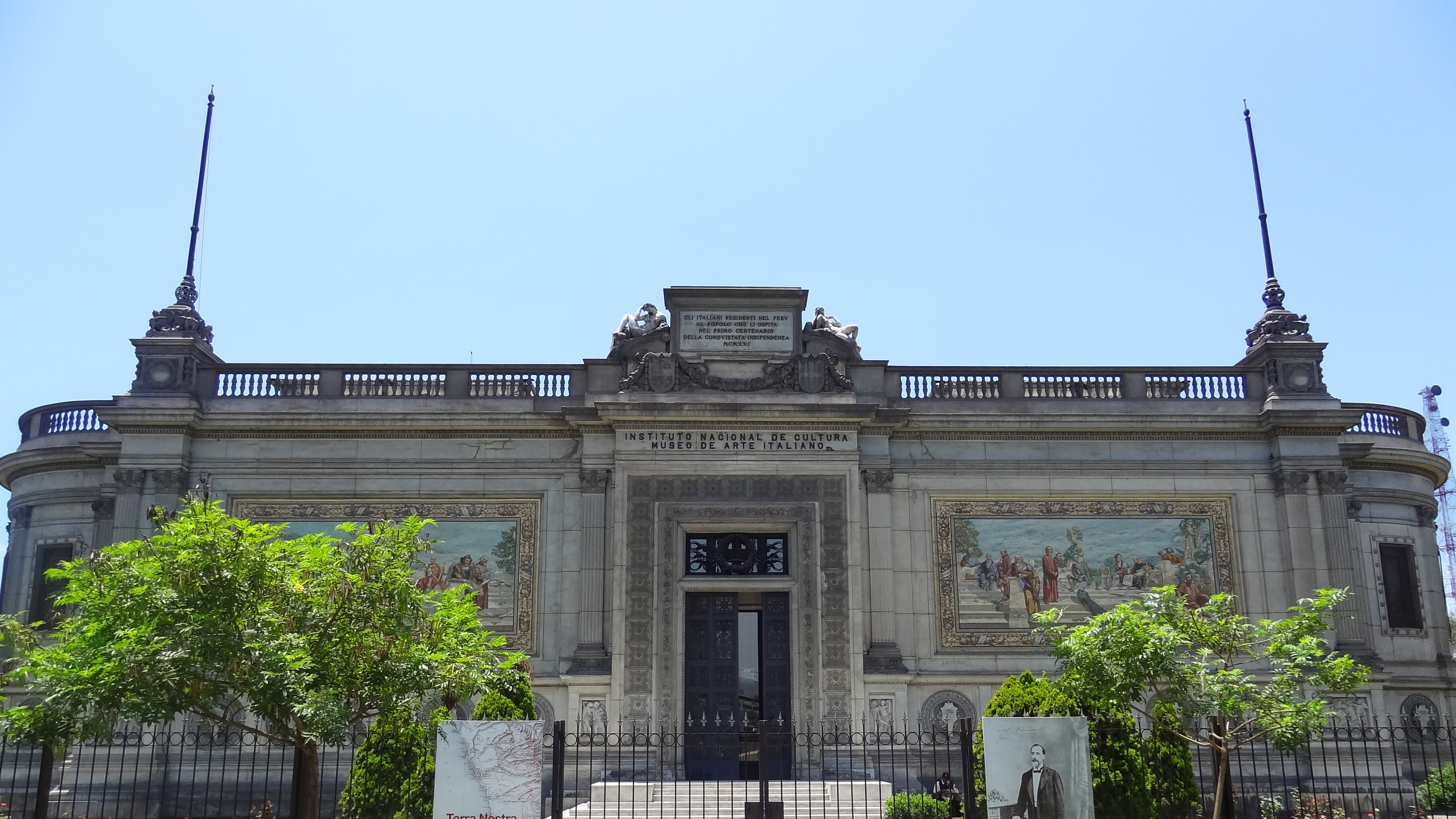
Italian Art Museum. Gift of the Italian colony for the first centenary (1921).

While the Peruvian independence process consisted of many events, Peruvian historians generally agree that the proclamation of independence that was given on 28 July 1821 marked the founding date for Peru. On the centennial of that date in 1921, President Augusto Leguía organized parties and celebrations across the entire country.

The city of Lima was the center of the celebrations and was adorned with large electric lights, which at the time were still quite new. The Congress of the Republic of Peru, the Government Palace (Peru), the Plaza Mayor, and the Tower of Unity were among the buildings lit. The Metropolitan Municipality of Lima unveiled a monument to admiral Abel-Nicolas Bergasse du Petit-Thouars that stands in front of the Radio Nacional del Perú headquarters.

Lima also played host to various delegations from other countries who visited to acknowledge and celebrate Peruvian Independence. Simultaneously, foreign colonies in Peru made a series of gifts to the city of Lima. From the German colony came Alemana Tower, from the British colony came the Estadio Nacional (1897), and from the Italian colony came the Museum of Italian Art.

=== Sesquicentennial ===
In 1971, the country celebrated its 150th anniversary since its independence. As a result, the Revolutionary Government established the National Commission for the Sesquicentennial of the Independence of Peru (Spanish: Comisión Nacional del Sesquicentenario de la Independencia del Perú (CNSIP)) to manage the celebrations.

== Preparations for the Bicentennial ==
On 6 October 2016, the government of President Pedro Pablo Kuczynski issued Supreme Resolution No. 246-2016-PCM, which formed the "Multisectoral Commission of a temporary nature in charge of formulating the Agenda for Commemoration of the Bicentennial of Peru", which would be tasked with:

- Proposing the commemoration agenda of the Executive of Peru;
- Propose and supervise competitions for project ideas and proposals that would allow the celebration on a regional and national scale;
- Supervise national competitions to select a logo, audiovisuals, and songs to identify the Bicentennial.

On 20 October 2016, the Congress of the Republic of Peru approved the formation of the "Special Multiparty Commemorative Commission of the Bicentennial of the Independence of Peru," whose presidency was entrusted to Peruvian Congressman Juan Sheput. This commission approved, among other activities, the promotion of research, publications, and discussions on three historical events: National Independence (1821), the establishment of the First Constituent Congress of Peru (1822), and the commemoration of the battles of Junín and Ayacucho (1824).

On 28 November 2017, President Kuczynski called for a contest to choose a logo and commemorative song for the Bicentennial, in a ceremony held on the Government Palace's Patio of Honor. On 6 June 2018, the Special Project Bicentennial of the Independence of Peru was published, which held the Bicentennial agenda.

On 10 November 2018, the Activities for the Bicentennial began. A centralized launch took place in Ayacucho, with other launches held in 22 regions of the country.

== Debate about the date of the Bicentennial ==
Although the government of Peru plans to celebrate the Bicentennial in 2021, the commonly accepted date among its people, some historians and intellectuals have pointed out that other Latin American countries hold their independence celebrations on the date of the first cry for independence. For example, in 2010 the bicentennials of the independence of Mexico (16 September), Argentina (25 May), Chile (18 September), Colombia (20 July) and Venezuela (19 April) were celebrated. Unlike Peru, those dates do not coincide with those of their respective independence declarations or proclamations, but rather what is considered to be the beginning of the independence process.

According to Peruvian historian Antonio Zapata Velasco, the matter should be decided by demystifying two things. First, if Peru commemorated the beginning of its independence process, it could be considered the date Francisco de Zela rebelled in 1811 or the date the Angulo brothers rebelled in 1814. The second thing to demystify is that Peru was the last country in South America to become independent. "If Bolivia celebrated its bicentennial like us, it would have happened in 2025 (and not 2009), since its freedom was achieved as a result of the Battle of Ayacucho." Following the same criteria, Ecuador's bicentennial would not have been 2009 "since the battle of Pichincha was in 1822. A Peruvian battalion, sent by San Martín, even participated in it," he says. Using the same basic criteria, the bicentennials of Chile and Argentina should have been in 2018 and 2016 respectively, not 2010, and both Mexico and Brazil would celebrate their bicentennials alongside Peru in 2021.

== Goals of the Bicentennial ==
- Zero deforestation.
- The entry of Peru to the Organization for Economic Cooperation and Development.
- A reduction in poverty by 15%.
- Receive 5.1 million tourists in 2021.
- Reduce labor informality by 58.6%
- Lima as the gastronomic capital of South America.
- Teaching English in all Peruvian basic education.

== Celebrations in the United States ==
Peru figured prominently in the history of the city of San Francisco with a strong relationship between San Francisco and Lima, Peru. The United States Postal Service issued a USPS Building Bridges Special Postal Cancellation Series on 18 February 2021 as part of a ceremony to celebrate the Bicentennial of Independence of Peru. commemorating the Opening Ceremony on 18 February 1939 of the Golden Gate International Exposition on Treasure Island, San Francisco, California, United States of America. The special cancellation ceremony was held outdoors in front of Treasure Island Museum and was conceived, designed, hosted and produced by Karen Earle Lile, in partnership with the United States Postal Service, Treasure Island Development Authority, the Treasure Island Museum, the Pacific Inter-Club Yachting Association and Treasure Island Yacht Club.

The General Consul of Peru in San Francisco on 19 February 1939, Fernando Berckemeyer Pazos (who later became the Ambassador of Peru to the United States in 1949) spoke at the Opening Ceremony of the Golden Gate International Exposition, also known as GGIE. As a commemoration of GGIE On 18 February 2021, the General Consul of Peru in San Francisco, Hernando Torres-Fernández, spoke at the USPS Building Bridges Special Cancellation Ceremony, which was filmed for broadcast internationally on a special event site.

At the USPS Building Bridges Special Postal Cancellation Ceremony on Feb 18, 2021, the Consul General Hernando Torres-Fernandez announced that the BAP Unión would return to San Francisco on 8–11 June 2021 for a second time as part of the Bicentennial of Independence of Peru celebrations. However, that plan for the Ship's journey was cancelled by the Peruvian Government on 19 February 2021 because of a Coronavirus surge, when the Government of Peru extended the COVID-19 health emergency for another 180 days, from 7 March to 2 September 2021.
