= USS Lady Washington (1776) =

History

United States
- Name: USS Lady Washington
- Namesake: Martha Washington
- In service: 1776
- Out of service: 1778
- Homeport: New York City

General characteristics
- Type: Row galley

Service record
- Part of: Continental Navy

USS Lady Washington was a row galley of the Continental Navy named in honor of Martha Washington. It was the first U.S. military ship to be named in honor of a woman (and of a future First Lady) and the first named for a person while the person was still alive (see also List of U.S. military vessels named after living Americans).

Lady Washington was built in New York City in the spring of 1776 at the behest of General George Washington after he transferred his forces from Boston to New York. Constructed with New York funds for the defense of the Hudson River, the galley remained active under Washington through June 1777. During the next year the New York fleet captured about a dozen prizes before the permanent British occupation of the city caused the State to abandon naval activities.

== See also ==
- Lady Washington, an 18th-century merchant sloop and its 1989 namesake replica.
- USS Martha Washington (ID-3019), transport ship that served during World War I.
