= Kendall Ross Bean: Chopin Polonaise in A Flat =

1986 classical music video

The Kendall Ross Bean - Chopin Polonaise in A Flat was one of the first classical music videos to be broadcast in the United States and Canada on 24 July 1986.

It was broadcast during the 1980s when the concept of the music video was being defined by record label's promotion and advertising departments, producers, directors and the TV channels who broadcast these short films. Music videos before 1986, featured primarily rock and pop musicians. When the Kendall Ross Bean Chopin: Polonaise in A flat classical music video was broadcast on the Arts and Entertainment Network, it was not as fancy or as expensively produced as the major recording label's rock and pop videos. But, it served the same function of promoting a classical pianist, as the rock music videos served in promoting rock artists. It captured the interest of newscasters, Arts and Entertainment Network and the ACE Awards because of its novelty, and the camera shots revealing the usually hidden innards of the piano in performance.

== Live piano music for silent films sets the stage ==
In the days of silent film, a pianist, would play live music for theatre audiences to accompany the film for each showing. Music was considered important in interpreting emotions, pacing and meaning of the film.

Kendall Ross Bean's grandmother, Knell Bean, was one of the many pianists across the country who played live piano for the silent movies. At the age of 4, Kendall was introduced to the piano and taught by his grandmother, who was his first piano teacher.

== Early music performances on TV in the 1940s and 1950s ==
In the 1940s, musicians and filmmakers created movie shorts known as Soundies. These films featured jazz or pop performers singing popular tunes in a studio or nightclub setting.

NBC had telecast a Metropolitan Opera presentation of Pagliacci on 10 March 1940, and all three major networks, NBC, ABC and CBS featured classical music and opera on a semi-regular basis.

Tony Terran played the trumpet in the first filmed television sitcom I Love Lucy and he was a trumpet player in the Desi Arnaz Orchestra, one of the first Rhythm and Blues combo bands on TV to use horns in the 1950s.

Through the 1970s live performance broadcasts of both classical, jazz, rock and pop music broadcasts of live performances continued to evolve. But, they did not develop into the art form we know today as the music video until the 1980s.

== The Emergence of the Music Video in the 1980s ==
Although music has been important to film and television from its inception, the music video of the 1980s placed the performer and the highly edited visuals in the spotlight with the definition of the music video as its own art form.

Music videos began as promotional films created by a music label's publicity department or an artist's management team. They showcased the artist performing an upcoming single from an unreleased album or a live performance of a current hit and involved camera editing techniques that were more elaborate than a typical live performance recording.

MTV was one of the first TV channels to broadcast a wide variety of rock and pop videos in the early 1980s. "Video Killed the Radio Star" by the Buggles, was the first music video broadcast by MTV. During the 1980s and 1990s, rock and pop music videos broadcast on television were being defined by MTV.

Rock and pop music videos and were often featured on primetime national and local news stations when they caught the public interest. The media attention that MTV and its music videos received, led to the public associating the music video art form with the genre of rock and pop featuring major label's music stars. When Arts and Entertainment Network, A&E, aired the Kendall Ross Bean classical music video to 18 million people on July 23, 1986, the concept of a music video featuring an independent record label's classical pianist performing, was considered a novelty. In the 1980s, there were very few outlets for Independent record labels because the market was dominated by the major labels.

Upon the airing of the Kendall Ross Bean Chopin Polonaise in A Flat on A&E, excerpts of this classical music video were also featured on TV stations during primetime news, TV magazine shows and in major newspapers while Kendall Bean was on tour in 1986. This was one of the first times that a classical music video served the same promotional and publicity purpose for an independent classical pianist as the rock music videos were serving for rock stars on tour during the 1980s.

Since there were no dedicated classical music video TV broadcast channels in the 1980s, classical music videos were featured in between regular programming of various television stations along with Public service announcements. A&E was one of the many networks that followed MTV's example and began playing music videos. A&E aired this classical music video in between its regular programming. Christina Haselfeld, spokeswomen for A&E in 1986, reported to the Orlando Sentinel that A&E's programing was geared primarily to features an hour or a half-hour in length. She stated that it was A&E's plan to air the Bean classical music video for three years along with other compatible classical music programs.

The first showing of the Kendall Ross Bean Chopin Polonaise in A Flat on Arts and Entertainment Network was paired with the re-broadcast of the 1938 Masterpiece sound film, Alexander Nevsky. In the Nevsky film, Sergei Eisenstein used an editing technique called "montage" that is used by filmmakers and music video directors to this day.

== Bean Classical Music Video Description ==
The video is 6 minutes and 55 seconds long. It was a created in a partnership arranged by producer Karen Earle Lile between Polara, and Independent Record label, and Tele-Communications Inc. doing business as Televents of Contra Costa in Lafayette, CA.

It was created in the Original Local Programming Studio of Televents in Lafayette, California. The video was created with two cameras and cut and dissolve edits. Lile had the piano action removed and a glass box built around it so that the camera could film the hammers and action mechanism working. Kendall Ross Bean, a master piano rebuilder, rebuilt the Vintage Mason and Hamlin piano featured in the video and designed the glass box that the action was put in for the filming.

The music video features a piano performance of Frédéric Chopin's A flat Polonaise. The sound used for the video was from a LP record album recorded by Kendall Ross Bean a couple of years before. Bean finger-synced the music for each video shot by listening to the audio recording and duplicating the performance on the keyboard in the glass box first and then on the piano. The video was shot from a story board and Bean had to finger sync for each section of the storyboard. It took several hours to film the video and Bean had to play for a moment or so to get up to speed every time a new camera angle was featured.

== The ACE Award Nomination ==
Karen Earle Lile was nominated as producer for The Kendall Ross Bean: Chopin Polonaise in A Flat Classical Music Video for an ACE Award for Outstanding Programming Achievement at a ceremony on May 18, 1987 by the National Academy of Cable Programing in the Ninth Annual System Awards for Cable Excellence in the category of Music Single.

Home Box Office led with 112 nominations for the ACE Award, or Award for Cable Excellence. Showtime got 48, Arts & Entertainment 33, and the Disney Channel and Cable News Network 10 each. 30 categories of the 174 ACE Awards were presented on a live broadcast on HBO on January 24, 1988. The other categories, which included the Outstanding Programming Achievement Award were presented at a non-televised awards events in Los Angeles and Las Vegas. The ACE awards were established after cable programs and performers were excluded from the Emmy Awards. The National Academy of Cable Programming was established in March 1985 to promote excellence in cable television programming.

Robert A. Stengel, Chairman of the System ACE Competition Committee, and Ralph M. Baruch, Chairman of the National Academy of Cable Programming, introduced the awards in the official programme. At the Ninth Annual System Ace Awards in Las Vegas, 132 nominees representing 71 cable systems and one access corporation were recognised. The nominees were selected from 720 entries, with 108 Academy members serving as preliminary judges and 42 judges participating in the final selection process.

Blue Ribbon Panel Judges for the May 18, 1987 Awards were:

- Pam Anderson, Art Director WXIA-TV 11ALIVE/Atlanta
- Steven C. F. Anderson, President and Executive Producer, Anderson Productions, Ltd.
- Diane Asadorian, Program Executive, SHOWTIME/THE MOVIE CHANNEL Showtime Networks
- Hedy August, Executive Producer, American Baby Cable
- Debby Beece, vice president, Programming, Nickelodeon/Nick at Nite
- Joan Boorstein, Manager, Film Acquisitions of East Coast, SHOWTIME/THE MOVIE CHANNEL, Showtime Networks
- Tim Braine, Vice President Executive Producer/On-Air-Promotion, Home Box Office
- Betty Cornfeld, Director of Programming, Film and Drama, Arts and Entertainment Network
- Liz Darling, Producer/Communications Director
- Fred Dressler, Vice President Programming, American Television & Communications Corporation
- Beatrice Dupont, Manager, Program Acquisitions, BRAVO Bravo (U.S. TV network)
- Ben Evans, Executive Vice President, Creative Director, Wills & Evans, Inc.
- Cady Ferguson, Producer/Writer
- Tom Furr, vice president, Program Promotion, SHOWTIME/THE MOVIE CHANNEL Showtime Networks
- Erica Gruen, Vice President=Associate Director, Electronic Media, DFS=Dorland Worldwide
- Suzanne Holeton, Broadcast Service Manager, Advertising Council, Inc. Ad Council
- Anne Janas
- Keith Kozicki, Producer/Director, Georgia Public Television
- Kathy Lach, Producer, WTBS
- Robert Lewis, president, Televents Group, Inc.
- Felice Linder, Senior Producer, On-/air Promotion, Lifetime Lifetime (TV network)
- David Lin, Executive Producer, Lifetime, Lifetime (TV network)
- Bob Mann, senior editor, Headline News HLN (TV channel)
- Jill Marks, editor, Cable Television Business Magazine
- Carole Rosen, Manager, Family Programming, Home Box Office
- Judy Rudrud, vice president, Publisher, Cable Television Business Magazine
- Hilary Schaeter, Manager, Original Programming, USA Network
- Willie Schatz, Sports Columnist
- Jody Shapiro, director, Programming, Home Team Sports
- Bill Shapland, Sports Information Director of Basketball, Georgetown University
- Rachel Shuster, TV Sports Columnist, USA Today
- John J. Sie, Senior Vice President, Tele-Communications, Inc.
- Don Smith, Executive Producer, Local Programming, WAGA-5 Atlanta
- Tom Southwick, editor, Multichannel News
- Herb Swan, Senior Vice President, ProServ Television
- Bill Taaffe, Writer, Sports Illustrated
- Terri Tingle, Senior Producer, Public Affairs, Turner Broadcasting System
- Judith Topper, associate editor, Cable Marketing Magazine
- Nancy Walzog, vice president, International, Tapestry Productions
- Richard Warner, Operations Manager Commentator, Georgia Radio News Service/WAGA-TV Atlanta
- Mark Wolf, Reporter, Rocky Mountain News
- Larry Woods, correspondent, CNN

== Credits ==
The credits are as follows:

- Performance by: Kendall Ross Bean
- Produced by: Karen Earle Lile
- Directed by: Charles P. Shepler
- Assistant Director: Lindsay Christensen
- Edit Director: Karen E. Lile
- Video Tape Production: Robb Barry, Lindsay Christensen, Charles P. Shepler
- Musical Director: Kendall Ross Bean
- Audio Recording Engineer: Robert Schumaker
- Video Production Assistant: Lisa D. Allen
- Poster Artist: Charlie Gutierrez
- Special Thanks to: Piano Finders
- Audio Track from: Kendall Ross Bean Chopin-Granados Album. 1984 © Polara Records
- A Televents Community Network Video Production: 1985 © Polara / Televents
