= Kendall Ross Bean =

American musician

- Education: University of California at Berkeley in Music; University of Texas at Austin Masters Degree in Piano Performance
- Occupations: Composer, Concert Pianist, Historian, Piano Rebuilder
- Spouse: Karen Earle Lile (m. div.)
- Children: 2
- Website: kendallrossbean.comteams.comkendallrossbean.com

Kendall Ross Bean is an American composer, concert pianist, piano rebuilder, historian and entrepreneur from the San Francisco Bay Area.

== Early years ==
Bean began to play piano at the age of 4 under the guidance of his grandmother Knell Bean who played live piano music for the Silent Movies. By the age of 8, he was composing his first music and at the age of 17, he recorded his first album as a youth soloist with the Utah Symphony. He obtained a master's degree in Piano Performance from the University of Texas at Austin

== Arts & Entertainment Network Debut ==
As a master piano rebuilder and concert pianist, Bean first performed on a piano he rebuilt in one of the first classical music videos to be broadcast across the United States on the A&E Network which in 1985 had 18 million cable viewers. This broadcast coincided with MTV emerging as a medium for record production companies to use music videos to promote the albums of Rock and Pop stars. The novelty of a classical music video featuring a solo pianist and the inside view of piano hammers hitting strings, contrasted to the high production rock music videos it caught media attention from coast to coast. This was at a time when independent artists were rarely featured in the media, and bookstores and music stores only carried major labels. The video was titled: Kendall Ross Bean: Chopin Polonaise in A Flat.

== Piano Rebuilder and Historian ==
Simultaneous to performing and composing, Bean began rebuilding pianos for Piano Finders in 1982.

Kendall Ross Bean, member of the Preservations Artisans Guild, was chosen, with Karen Earle Lile, by Mercersburg Academy to research and authenticate the provenance of the Lennon-Ono-Green-Warhol piano before it was put up for sale to fund a Deed of Trust by the Shaool Family to Mercersburg Academy for future student scholarships. This was entered into the Piano Finders Historical Archive as Bean/Lile's 3,521st piano appraisal, inspection and provenance commission. Because this piano was part of a famous lawsuit in 2000 and had extensive coverage as the “Lost Lennon Piano”, when provenance research done by Lile and piano authentication by Bean was revealed by the Alex Cooper Auctioneers to the public, the provenance became the subject of dozens of newspapers and magazines that picked up the story.

=== Recording and Rebuilding Pianos at Fantasy Studios ===
A relationship with Fantasy Studios as both recording artist and piano rebuilder began in 1985 and continued until this large independent recording studio closed in 2018. Bean rebuilt the Bill Evans piano, the McCoy Tyner, the George Winston piano and a 1952 Steinway D Concert Grand that were used for recording at Fantasy Studios. In 2018, Bean was part of a collaborative benefit album for KCSM (FM) titled Two Weeks Inside Studio D on which he performed Fats Waller's Handfull of Keys on three of the four Fantasy Studios pianos he had rebuilt and the sound engineer did a mystery mix of the three pianos in the same song. Over 60 artists recorded on the album, including contributions by George Winston, Allison Miller (drummer), Taylor Eigsti, Mimi Fox, Rob Dehlinger, Tammy Hall, and other Grammy award-winning artists and San Francisco Bay Area recording artists who had recorded many albums in the studio over the years. KCSM (FM) featured the album extensively and raised over US$300,000 for the station during their Feb 2019 fundraiser.

== Project Collaborations ==
=== USPS Building Bridges Special Postal Cancellation Design ===
Bean is also the co-concept designer for the USPS Building Bridges Special Postal Cancellation Series logo with Karen Earle Lile. This 1992 design has been featured in numerous USPS pictorial postal cancellations since 1996 and features a black hand and white hand forming a bridge over water with a rainbow above. The logo was first designed and used on KTOP TV in Oakland in 1992 for a series of local music videos and then was adopted by USPS in 1996 for the first Special Postal Cancellation of the ongoing series.

=== Break Free on Wings of Music Project ===
During the pandemic, the Oakland Symphony commissioned Kendall Ross Bean to write an orchestral and choral tone poem to a libretto by Karen Earle Lile titled “Break Free on Wings of Music”. The work was finished 4 days before Michael Morgan (conductor) died. The musical work was then dedicated to Maestro Michael Morgan, who had conducted the Oakland Symphony for 30 years, been a guest conductor at major orchestras and been a leader in keeping music programs in elementary and secondary schools.

=== Treasure Island World Fair Anniversary Celebrations 1939-2022 ===
During the COVID-19 pandemic in the United States, on April 16, 2022, two arrangements of Kendall Ross Bean's “Break Free on Wings of Music” composition were featured in the Treasure Island World's Fair Anniversary Celebrations 1939-2022 celebrating the Golden Gate International Exposition on Treasure Island, San Francisco at the Treasure Island Museum. The first was a cello and piano arrangement of “Break Free on Wings of Music” performed live by Grammy Award winning artist Jonah Kim and Kendall Ross Bean. The second was a 1939 big band style arrangement of the same piece arranged by James Anthony McMillen and performed by MoodSwing Orchestra. A ballet film choreographed and performed by Tiit Helimets and Julia Rowe at the Metropolitan Club in San Francisco was premiered at this event. This ballet film was choreographed to the cello recording of Bean's “Break Free on Wings of Music” that was recorded by Jonah Kim and Bean on June 5, 2022, at Skywalker Sound the first day the recording studio opened after the COVID-19 pandemic lockdown was lifted in San Francisco. The ballet was staged inside the Metropolitan Club of San Francisco at a time when many venues were still shuttered because of the pandemic.

=== 110th Anniversary of Glenn L. Martin’s flight from Balboa Pier to Catalina Island and 1st Airmail Delivery ===
May 10, 14 15 and 16, 2022, a trumpet fanfare and a clarinet/guitar and vocal arrangement of the 4th movement of “Break Free on Wings of Music” were featured as part of the ceremonies for the 110th Anniversary of Glenn L. Martin’s first Air Mail Delivery in Newport Beach, California, Avalon, California and Los Angeles International Airport. The fanfare was performed by trumpet player Chris Tedesco in Newport Beach and then Avalon after a helicopter flight to mark 110th Anniversary Glenn L. Martin’s first flight of a sea plane from Newport Beach to Avalon in 1912. The last fanfare was at the Flight Path Museum LAX located in the Los Angeles International Airport.
