= A&E (TV network) =

American cable and satellite television network

- Country: United States
- Broadcast area: United States; Canada
- Headquarters: New York City, New York, U.S.

Programming
- Language: English
- Picture format: 1080i (HDTV)

Ownership
- Owner: Hearst Communications
- Parent: A+E Global Media
- Sister channels: Crime & Investigation; FYI; History Channel; Lifetime; LMN; Lifetime Real Women; Military History

History
- Launched: February 1, 1984; 42 years ago
- Replaced: Alpha Repertory Television Service; The Entertainment Channel
- Closed: January 1985; 41 years ago (as a block on Nickelodeon)
- Replaced by: Nick at Nite (as a block on Nickelodeon)
- Former names: Arts & Entertainment Network (1984–1995); A&E Network (1995–1997)

Links
- Website: aetv.com

Availability

Terrestrial
- Affiliated Streaming Service(s): Tubi

Streaming media
- Service(s): DirecTV Stream, Frndly TV, Hulu + Live TV, Philo, Sling TV

A&E (an initialism of its original name, the Arts & Entertainment Network) is an American cable and satellite television network and the flagship property of A+E Global Media, a property of Hearst Communications. A&E was launched on February 1, 1984, as a block on Nickelodeon. The network originally focused on fine arts, documentaries, dramas and educational entertainment. Today, it deals primarily in non-fiction programming, including reality television, true crime, documentaries and miniseries, thus de-emphasizing its full name in the process.

Since 1985, it is no longer a programming block, due to its joint owners spinning it off into a 24-hour channel while Nickelodeon later launched Nick at Nite to fill in the time slot A&E formerly held. As of November 2023, A&E is available to approximately 63,000,000 pay television households in the United States – down from its 2011 peak of 100,000,000 households. The American version of the channel is being distributed in Canada while international versions were launched for Australia, Latin America, and Europe.

== History ==
=== 1984–2002 ===
A&E launched on February 1, 1984, initially available to 9.3 million cable television homes in the U.S. and Canada. The network is a result of the 1984 merger of Hearst/ABC's Alpha Repertory Television Service (ARTS) and (pre–General Electric merger) RCA-owned The Entertainment Channel.

It was originally available in two versions, one in an 8-hour version, which was to follow Nickelodeon on RCA Satcom III-R, the other was a full 20-hour version, on another satellite provider, the Westar V. In 1984, the signal split off from Nickelodeon, once A&E picked up its 20-hour signal on RCA Satcom III-R. In response, Nickelodeon launched its own nighttime block Nick at Nite to displace A&E on many signals.

In 1986, the network premiered one of the first classical music videos to be broadcast in the United States and Canada, the Kendall Ross Bean: Chopin Polonaise in A Flat.

By 1990, original programming accounted for 35 to 40 percent of A&E's content. Biography, a one-hour documentary series that was revived in 1987, was considered to be the network's signature show. In 1994, airings of Biography went from weekly broadcasts to airing five nights a week, which helped boost A&E's ratings to record levels. The nightly series became A&E's top-rated show and one of cable television's most notable successes. Biography received Primetime Emmy Awards in 1999 and 2002.

In 1993, Rockefeller Group’s Radio City Music Hall sold its 12.5% stake of A&E to Capital Cities/ABC, Hearst & NBC, NBC owns 25% stake of A&E, while the others 37.5% stake of the two. In 1994, the channel picked up reruns of Law & Order on an eight-year agreement, which would help bring in additional viewers.

In May 1995, the channel's name officially changed to the A&E Network, to reflect its declining focus on arts and entertainment. The following year, the network had branded itself as simply A&E, using the slogans "Time Well Spent" and in 1998, "Escape the Ordinary." "The word 'arts,' in regard to television, has associations such as 'sometimes elitist,' 'sometimes boring,' 'sometimes overly refined' and 'doesn't translate well to TV,'" Whitney Goit, executive vice president for sales and marketing, stated. "Even the arts patron often finds arts on TV not as satisfying as it should be ... And the word 'entertainment' is too vague. Therefore, much like ESPN uses its letters rather than what they stand for – Entertainment Sports (Programming) Network – we decided to go to just A&E." Of the network's tagline, Goit said, "Intellectually, 'Time well spent' defines a comparison between those who view a lot of television as a wasteland, and their acknowledgment that there are good things on TV and that they'd like to watch more thought-provoking TV."

A&E and Meridian Broadcasting commissioned Horatio Hornblower (1999), winner of two Primetime Emmy Awards, and the seven subsequent dramas in the series; Dash and Lilly (1999), which received nine Emmy nominations; and The Crossing (2000), which won the Peabody Award. The network created two original weekly drama series, Sidney Lumet's 100 Centre Street and Nero Wolfe, both of which ran from 2001 to 2002.

=== 2002–2013 ===
In 2002, the contract for Law and Order had expired with the renewal asking price at four times the original per episode fee. Dropping that show allowed the channel to move to more "brand-defining scripted and nonfiction series." That same year, A&E would shift its focus toward reality television in order to attract a younger demographic and cancelled the network's two original scripted series. In May 2003, A&E launched a marketing campaign with the network's new tagline, "The Art of Entertainment." Between 2003 and 2007, the channel gradually retired several long-running series, moving several shows to The Biography Channel and introducing new reality programming. In 2005, A&E launched their feature film production arm A&E IndieFilms.

The docudrama Flight 93, about the hijacking of the plane which crashed in Pennsylvania during the September 11 attacks, was the most watched program on the network; it attracted 5.9 million viewers for its initial telecast on January 30, 2006. This was later surpassed by Duck Dynasty's third season premiere. The previous record-holder for the network was a World War II docudrama, Ike: Countdown to D-Day, starring Tom Selleck and broadcast in 2004, with 5.5 million viewers. A&E later acquired rights to rerun the HBO series The Sopranos; its A&E premiere on January 10, 2007, averaged 3.86 million viewers, making it the most-watched premiere of a rerun off-network series in cable television history at the time. The series continued to perform well for A&E, and led the network to regularly rank in the top ten basic U.S. cable channels in prime time ratings.

On May 26, 2008, in conjunction with the premiere of the original film The Andromeda Strain, A&E rebranded with a new logo and slogan, Real Life. Drama., representing its shift to a more contemporary network with a focus on scripted programming. Additional shows in this major scripted push were drama series The Cleaner and The Beast, which both lasted two seasons. A&E ordered several dramas for Fall 2009, including projects from Jerry Bruckheimer, Shawn Ryan and Lynda Obst, and a Western miniseries from Kevin Costner. On July 10, 2012, NBCUniversal announced it would sell 15.8% stake of A&E Networks to Disney and Hearst, making the company a 50-50 joint venture.

=== 2013–2019 ===
On December 11, 2013, A&E unveiled a new on-air brand identity built around the slogan "Be Original", emphasizing the network's lineup of original productions and positioning it as a "much lighter, more fun place to come and spend time". The success of Duck Dynasty, Bates Motel and Storage Wars put A&E fourth in 2013 among cable channels in the key 18-to-49 age demographic.

On February 20, 2014, A&E Networks UK announced a UK version of the channel to launch on Sky channel 168 on March 24, with a Virgin Media launch date planned for next year. In Spain and Portugal, the channel was launched on October 1, 2014, replacing The Biography Channel in that market.

In 2015, A&E picked up the CBS drama Unforgettable for a fourth season as well as the second season of docuseries Married at First Sight, which will move from sister network FYI. The network also announced the revival of Intervention following its cancellation in 2013.

In October 2016, A&E premiered Live PD, a live series that followed U.S. police departments on patrol in real-time. The show would quickly garner commercial success; in 2018, a survey by Inscape found Live PD to be the most-watched program among non-live (DVR and VOD) and over-the-top viewers in 2018. Live PD was among the most-watched programs on cable television during its run and was credited for allowing A&E to reverse the trend of systematic viewership declines seen across cable television networks.

On January 19, 2017, A&E announced a reboot of Cold Case Files, over a decade after its final season premiered in 2006. A revival of the Biography franchise would also launch on June 28, 2017, with The Notorious Life of Biggie Smalls.

=== 2020–present ===
In June 2020, amid a suspension in light of the George Floyd protests, A&E cancelled Live PD after reports were confirmed that the show's producers had recorded and subsequently deleted footage of the killing of Javier Ambler while he was in police custody. The footage was erased after the Austin Police Department conducted an investigation using the body-camera footage recorded by the officers. While defending the show in a statement, host Dan Abrams said that "contrary to many incorrect reports, neither A&E nor the producers of Live PD were asked for the footage or an interview by investigators from law enforcement or the District Attorney's office." A&E's reliance on the series to fill its schedule resulted in the network losing half of its audience; up until that point, A&E's primetime viewership had increased by 4% year over year.

In 2021, A&E began a partnership with WWE Studios—a production arm of the professional wrestling promotion WWE—to develop original content chronicling the company's history and performers. The pact began with eight episodes of Biography focusing on WWE figures, and WWE's Most Wanted Treasures—a series following Stephanie McMahon and Paul "Triple H" Levesque in their search of wrestling memorabilia. Most Wanted Treasures was A&E's most-watched new series in 2021, while the premiere of a Biography episode on Stone Cold Steve Austin attracted the franchise's highest viewership in 16 years.

In 2022, WWE and A&E announced a 24-episode renewal for Most Wanted Treasures, an additional 35 Biography: WWE Legends episodes, and the new series WWE Rivals. Rivals was renewed for a second season that premiered in February 2023, alongside the third season of Biography: WWE Legends. In December 2024, WWE announced a new reality series—WWE LFG—to premiere in 2025, as well as the new documentary series WWE's Greatest Moments and renewals for WWE Rivals. In March 2025, A&E renewed WWE LFG and WWE's Greatest Moments.

== Programming ==
Notable original series seen on A&E have included Leah Remini: Scientology and the Aftermath, Breakfast with the Arts, The First 48, Duck Dynasty, Intervention, Live PD, Storage Wars and Wahlburgers.

=== Original and co-produced movies and miniseries ===
- Pride and Prejudice (1995)
- Emma (1996)
- Jane Eyre (1997)
- The Pale Horse (1997)
- The Ebb-Tide (1998)
- Tess of the D'Urbervilles (1998)
- Hornblower (1998–2003)
- Vanity Fair (1998)
- Murder in a Small Town (1999)
- The Lady in Question (1999)
- P.T. Barnum (1999)
- The Scarlet Pimpernel (1999–2000)
- Small Vices (1999)
- The Golden Spiders: A Nero Wolfe Mystery (2000)
- The Great Gatsby (2000)
- Longitude (2000)
- Lorna Doone (2000)
- Thin Air (2000)
- The Lost Battalion (2001)
- The Lost World (2001)
- Victoria & Albert (2001)
- Walking Shadow (2001)
- Lathe of Heaven (2002)
- The Magnificent Ambersons (2002)
- Napoléon (2002)
- Shackleton (2002)
- Benedict Arnold: A Question of Honor (2003)
- The Mayor of Casterbridge (2003)
- Murderball (2005)
- Jesus Camp (2006)
- My Kid Could Paint That (2007)
- Cartel Land (2015)
- Life, Animated (2016)

== Criticism and controversy ==
=== Secrets of Playboy ===
Beginning in January 2022, A&E broadcast a 12-part series entitled "Secrets of Playboy." This included allegations that Hugh Hefner himself had committed rape and sexual assault. The show also included claims that other men in the Playboy orbit, such as Bill Cosby, had committed rape. One of the women coming forward was Sondra Theodore, Hefner's girlfriend in the late 1970s and early '80s. She stated that many people in fact believed the reports and accusations, but tended to blame the women anyway because of the reputation of the Playboy Mansion, even though Playboy tried to put forward a healthy "Girl Next Door" attitude. This A&E series also include claims by Dr. Mark Saginor's estranged daughter, by Theodore, and by former butler Mitch Rosen that the doctor was not only Hefner's live-in physician, but also his male lover. Dr. Saginor said this was not the case.

Some Playboy employees signed a statement which read: “ . . Our time within Hugh Hefner's Playboy and the organization's subsidiaries remains a period all of us are fond of. I proudly sign this letter in recognition of Hugh Hefner's character amid unfounded allegations in the A&E show.” In response, A&E issued a statement which read: “The stories shared in Secrets of Playboy are the personal experiences of the documentary's participants and deserve to be told despite how difficult they may be for some to hear. Signatures on a letter, or a different experience with Mr. Hefner or the Playboy culture, do not negate the experiences of those who have come forward . . ”

=== Longmire ===
The 2014 cancellation of Longmire drew viewer backlash over the network citing that the show skewed an older audience as one of the reasons. The series was later picked up by Netflix.

=== Duck Dynasty ===
On December 19, 2013, A&E attempted to place Phil Robertson from Duck Dynasty on an indefinite hiatus following remarks on homosexuals in an interview with GQ. A&E said in a statement, "We are extremely disappointed to have read Phil Robertson's comments in GQ, which are based on his own personal beliefs and are not reflected in the series Duck Dynasty. His personal views in no way reflect those of A+E Networks, who have always been strong supporters and champions of the LGBT community." On December 27, 2013, A&E announced they would begin filming again with the entire Robertson family after an outcry from show viewers and discussions with the Robertson family and numerous advocacy groups, a decision which itself resulted in more criticism of the network for refusing to stand by its original statement.

=== Nero Wolfe ===
Earlier, A&E had been criticized for extreme channel drift from its original focus on the fine arts. For example, Maury Chaykin reflected on the cancellation of the A&E original series A Nero Wolfe Mystery in a 2008 interview: "I'm a bit jaded and cynical about which shows succeed on television. I worked on a fantastic show once called Nero Wolfe, but at the time A&E was transforming from the premiere intellectual cable network in America to one that airs Dog the Bounty Hunter on repeat, so it was never promoted and eventually went off the air."
