= Hawaiian Chieftain =

Sailing vessel

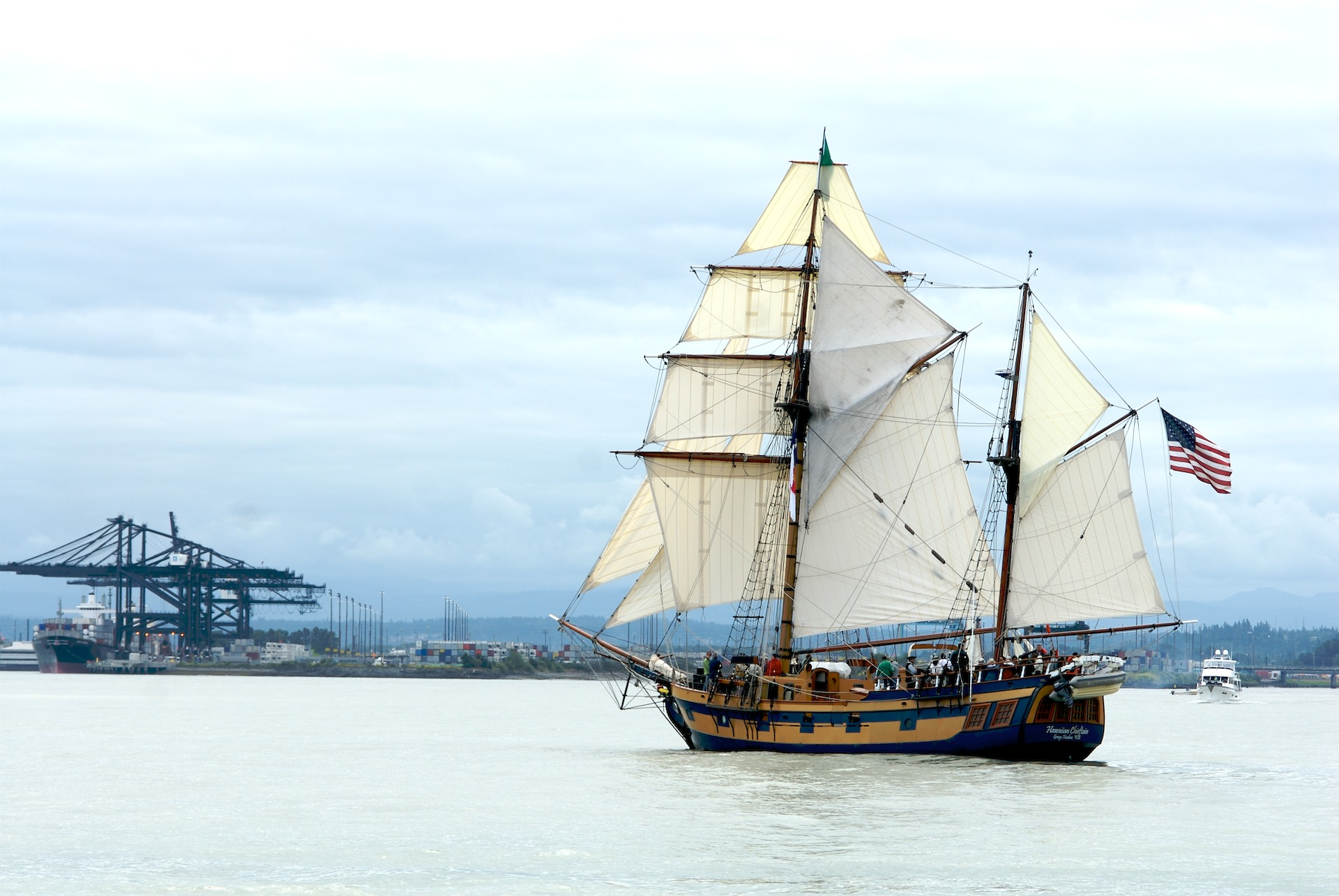
- Hawaiian Chieftain participating in the 2008 Tacoma Tall Ships Festival

History

United States
- Name: Hawaiian Chieftain
- Operator: Aubrey and Matt Wilson
- Builder: Lahaina Welding Co. Ltd. (Drake Thomas)
- Laid down: 1985, Lahaina, Hawaii
- Launched: June 12, 1988
- Identification: MMSI number: 367092520; Callsign: WDC8751
- Notes: Designed by Raymond H. Richards

General characteristics
- Type: Square topsail ketch
- Displacement: 64 tons
- Length: 103 ft (31 m) sparred length; 65 ft (20 m) on deck; 62 ft (19 m) at waterline
- Beam: 22 ft (7 m)
- Height: 75 ft (23 m)
- Draft: 5.5 ft (1.7 m)
- Notes: Sail area is 4,200 sq ft (390 m^{2}); Steel hull

Hawaiian Chieftain is a sailing vessel briefly known as the Spirit of Larinda. Built in 1988 in Lahaina on the island of Maui, the Hawaiian Chieftain is a contemporary interpretation of a traditional design. She is unique with the rig of a 19th-century trading vessel and a modern triple keel, shallow draft hull. Drawing only 5.5 feet (1.7 m), she is highly maneuverable in shallow waters.

The Hawaiian Chieftain was commissioned by Laurence H. Dorcy Jr., designed by nautical architect Ray Richards, and built by Lahaina Welding Co. Ltd. on the island of Maui; Drake Thomas was the ship's builder. Lofting, initial hull framing and partial hull plating was performed by Morgan Davies (until his departure from the project in December 1986). Completion of hull welding (including bow and topside plating) was performed by ship welders Ken Bear, Bill Purvis, Lionel Clemons and Oliver Pagttie. Additional expert tradesmen were hired for the rigging (George Herbert/Ivan Hope), ship's carpentry, machinery (Alan Fleming, Carl Geringer) and electrical installation (Neil Willmann). Master Mariner Des Kearns played a key role as a Project Director from early 1987 until launch in June 1988. Under its paint, her bowsprit bears the inscription "Lahaina Welding Co." Her maiden voyage was to French Polynesia on April 1, 1990, and arriving in Papeete on April 20, 1990. She was based in Sausalito, CA for many years, sailing up and down the coast with the Lady Washington on Voyages of ReDiscovery, providing hands-on history programs teaching 4th and 5th graders about the exploration and trade along the West Coast in the 1790s.

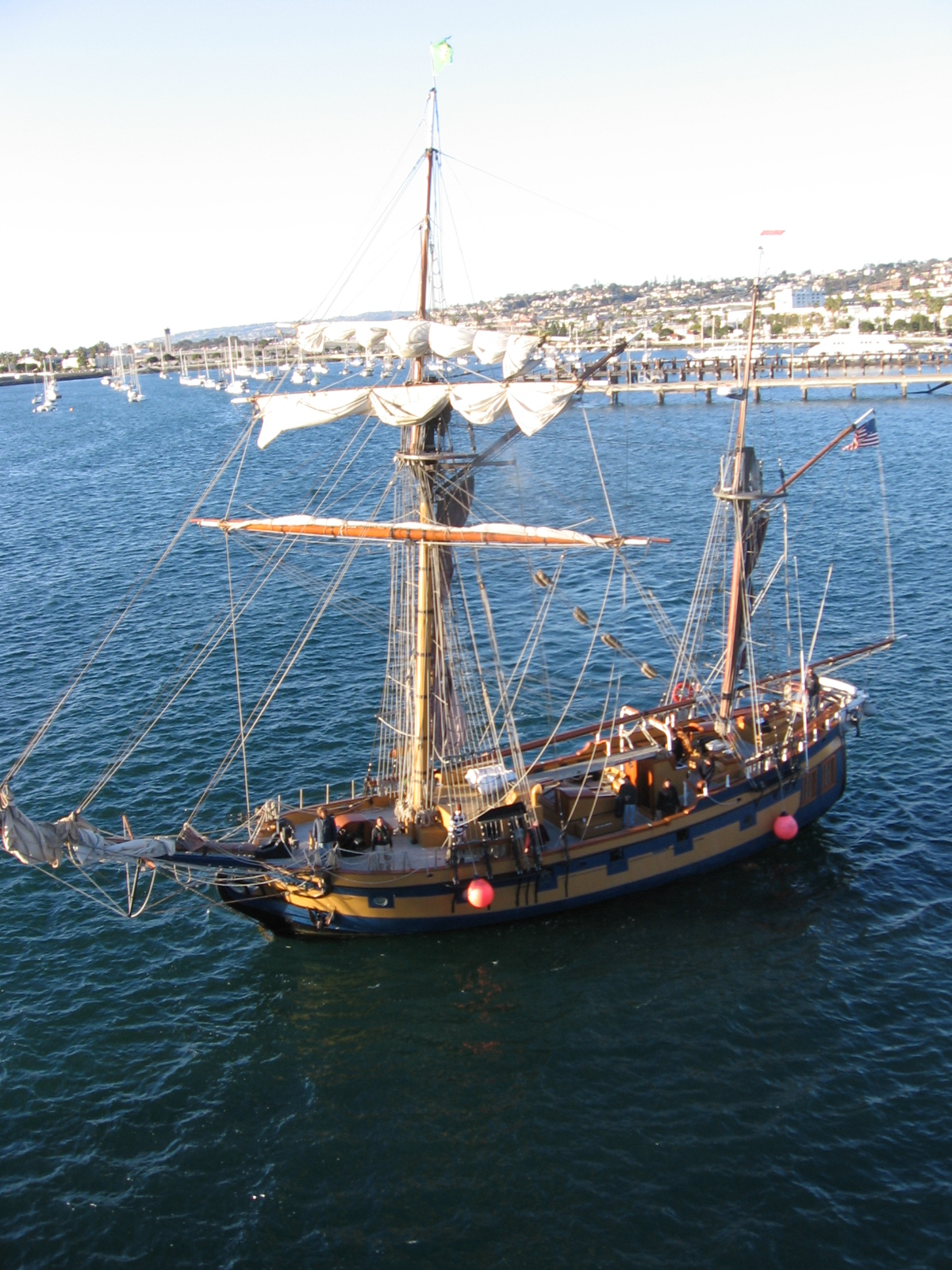
Hawaiian Chieftain in her current colors

In the winter of 2004, she was sold to a Cape Cod sailing program and renamed the Spirit of Larinda; however, due to the unexpected death of her owner, she remained inactive. In October 2005, the Grays Harbor Historical Seaport Authority, owner of Lady Washington, purchased her to add to its fleet. Returning to her original identity as the Hawaiian Chieftain, she joined up with the Lady Washington on February 25, 2006, to provide joint education and sail training up and down the west coast of the United States. In February, 2020, GHHSA announced they would be retiring Hawaiian Chieftain to focus on operation of Lady Washington.

In July 2021, she was purchased by Aubrey and Matt Wilson who intend to restore her. When restoration is complete, the Wilsons plan to take Chieftain back to Hawai'i where she will take on passengers for day sails, be available for tours and events, and offer educational programs and sail training opportunities.

== See also ==
- Rigging
- Tall ship
