= Grays Harbor Historical Seaport Authority =

Coordinates: 46.972°N 123.798°W

Grays Harbor Historical Seaport Authority, also known as Grays Harbor Historical Seaport, is a government authority created in 1986 by the city of Aberdeen, Washington, as a 501(c)(3) corporation. It was created to commemorate Washington's centennial of statehood. Operations began in 1987 with the purpose of building and operating a full-scale reproduction of the 18th-century brig Lady Washington. Additional goals were to build and operate a maritime museum to promote tourism and economic development in the Grays Harbor area, and to provide educational programs for schools and communities.

== Fleet ==
The authority owns and operates a fleet of vessels.

Current vessels:

- Lady Washington a 1989 replica of the 18th century brig of the same name.
- Capt. Matt Peasley and Hewitt R. Jackson are replica longboats from the ship Columbia Rediviva

Former vessels:

- Hawaiian Chieftain a square topsail ketch, sold in 2021 after being retired in 2020 due to electrolysis weakening its steel hull.

== Seaport Landing ==
The Seaport Landing is a 38-acre riverfront property formerly used as a sawmill by Weyerhaeuser and donated to GHHSA in 2013. Plans are to build a mixed-use waterfront development with six major project elements

- Environmental remediation

Addressing the impacts resulting from over 100 years of industrial use. Notably diesel and oil in groundwater, shoreline hazardous waste and wood waste accumulation.

- Interpretive center

An interactive learning center designed for school age children and families to learn about the maritime history and ecology of Grays Harbor.

- Waterfront trail and park

Multi-purpose trail with activity nodes and interpretive elements that integrates habitat enhancement along the shoreline.

- Commercial businesses

Riverfront accommodations for tourists and dining for visitors and locals.

- Moorage improvements

Construction of a floating dock adjacent to an existing fixed pier to improve accessibility to the tall ships during the range of tides. Creation of a public boat launch operated by the city of Aberdeen.

- Education programs

Renovation of existing industrial building for use as a maritime trade school in partnership with Grays Harbor Community College.

== Other projects ==
- The Spar Shop – The Spar Shop provided at-risk youth with job shadowing and vocational training opportunities. The 10,000-square-foot drive-through shop featured the largest tracer-lathe in North America. They could turn logs up to 40 inches in diameter and 122 feet in length. Its current status is unknown, but it will be part of the new Seaport Landing.
- The Seafarer Collective (formerly Sea School Northwest) – The Seafarer Collective (TSC) is a vocational training program for aspiring mariners. They offer an Entry-Level Merchant Mariner Course, Recreational Marlinspike Course, and a USCG-Approved Online Able Bodied Seaman Certificate Course.
