= Lady Washington =

Ship

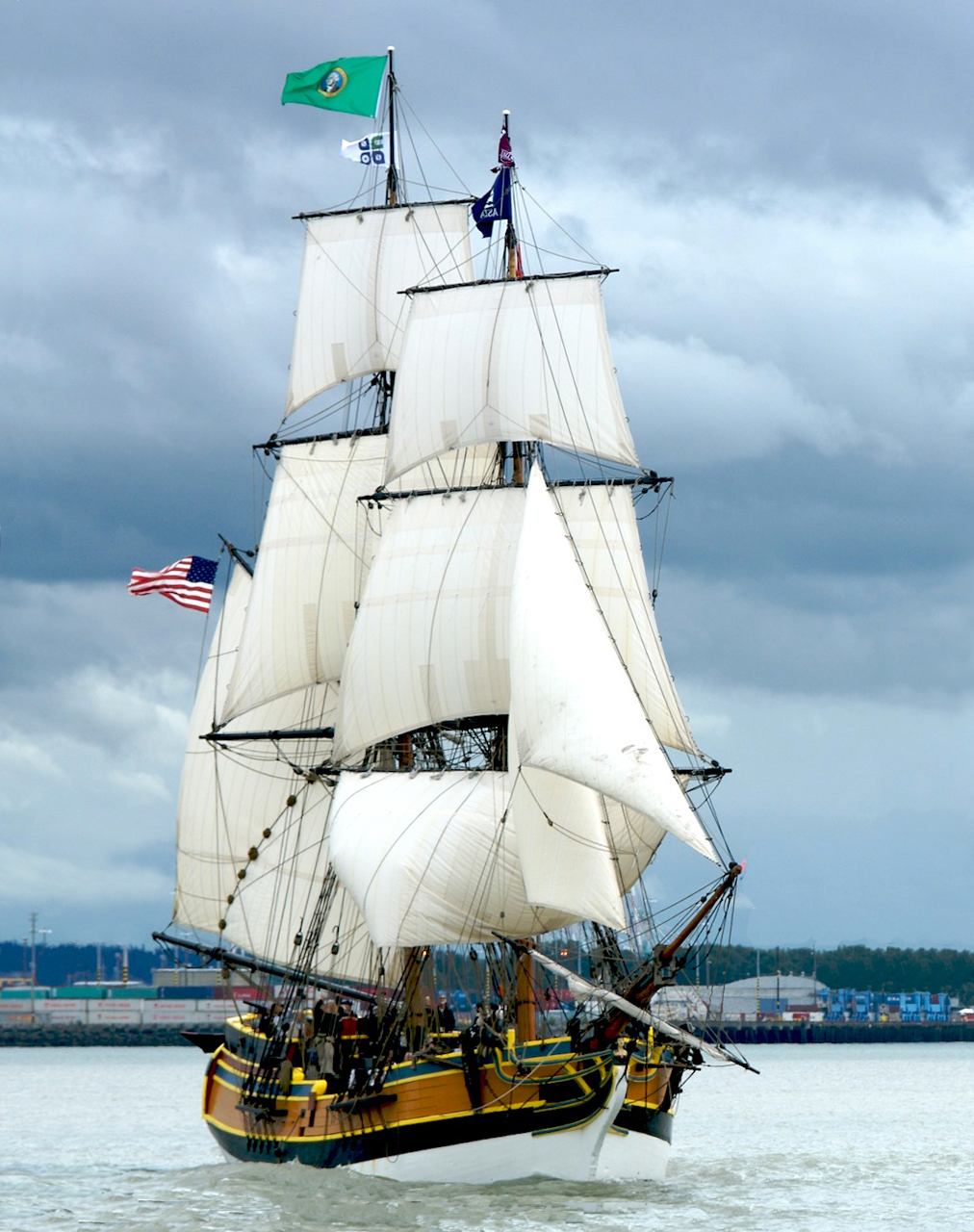
- Lady Washington on Commencement Bay

History

United States
- Name: Lady Washington (replica)
- Operator: Grays Harbor Historical Seaport Authority
- Builder: Ray Wallace, designer; Richard Miles, shipwright
- Laid down: 1987
- Launched: March 7, 1989
- Home port: Aberdeen, WA
- Identification: MMSI number: 366945360; Callsign: WAA2820
- Honors and awards: Washington tall ship ambassador; Washington State Ship
- Status: Active as of 2019

General characteristics
- Tonnage: 99 tons (gross)
- Displacement: 210 tons
- Tons burthen: 178 tons
- Length: 67 ft (20 m) (LOD); 72 ft (22 m) (LWL); 112 ft (34 m) (LOA)
- Beam: 22 ft (7 m)
- Height: 89 ft (27 m) (Rig height)
- Draft: 11 ft (3 m)
- Sail plan: Brig(US)/Brigantine(UK); 4,442 sq ft (410 m^{2})
- Complement: 12 (crew), 45 (passenger)
- Armament: Two three pounder; two swivels aft
- Notes: Douglas fir hull

Lady Washington is a ship name shared by at least four vessels. The original sailed during the American Revolutionary War and harassed British shipping. Another vessel was used as a merchant trading vessel in the Pacific. A somewhat updated modern replica was created in 1989. The replica has appeared in numerous films and television shows, standing in as other real or fictional ships.

== USS Lady Washington (US naval vessel) ==
The original USS Lady Washington was a row galley with a crew of 60–80 rowers. Commissioned by the Continental Congress in 1776 and named in honor of Martha Washington, she was captained by Nailer Hatch. Her early history is documented in the Massachusetts Soldiers and Sailors of the Revolutionary War as well as other documents.

== Lady Washington (American merchant ship) ==
The Lady Washington, commonly referred to simply as the Washington, was originally a single-masted sloop of 90 tons burden. As part of the Columbia Expedition seeking valuable otter furs, she left Boston Harbor on October 1, 1787 under command of Robert Gray. She served as consort to the much larger Columbia Rediviva captained by the expedition’s leader John Kendrick. The two ships sailed around Cape Horn (the first US-flagged ships to do so) and participated in the maritime fur trade with the coastal indigenous people of the Pacific Northwest. After landing near Tillamook, Oregon in August, 1788, fur trade continued through the winter and spring on and in the vicinity of Vancouver Island.

In August, 1789, Captain Kendrick unexpectedly changed vessels with Gray, assuming command of the Washington. Kendrick stayed on the coast until summer, 1790, at which time he sailed the Washington to Macau to sell his cargo of furs. While there, Kendrick used proceeds from the fur sales to refit the Lady Washington as a two-masted, square-rigged brig (or brigantine). In 1791 he sailed her back to Vancouver Island. John Meares claimed that she was the first non-native vessel to circumnavigate Vancouver Island.

Lady Washington became the first American vessel to reach Japan in an unsuccessful attempt to move some unsold pelts. Lady Washington remained in the Pacific trade and eventually foundered in the Philippines in 1797. She was lost at the mouth of the Mestizo River, near Vigan, northwest Luzon in July 1797.

== Lady Washington (20th-century replica) ==
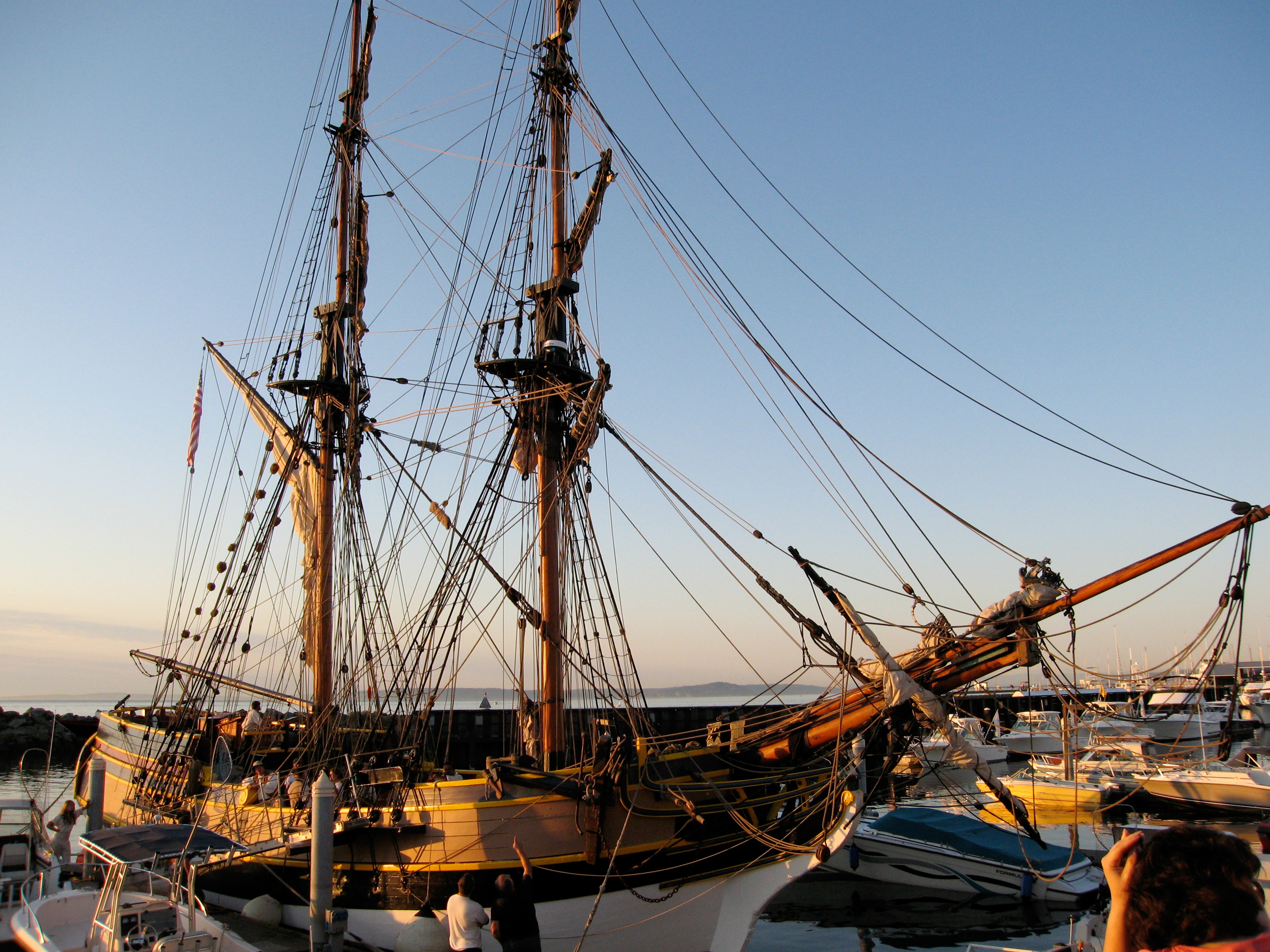
Lady Washington at Port of Edmonds

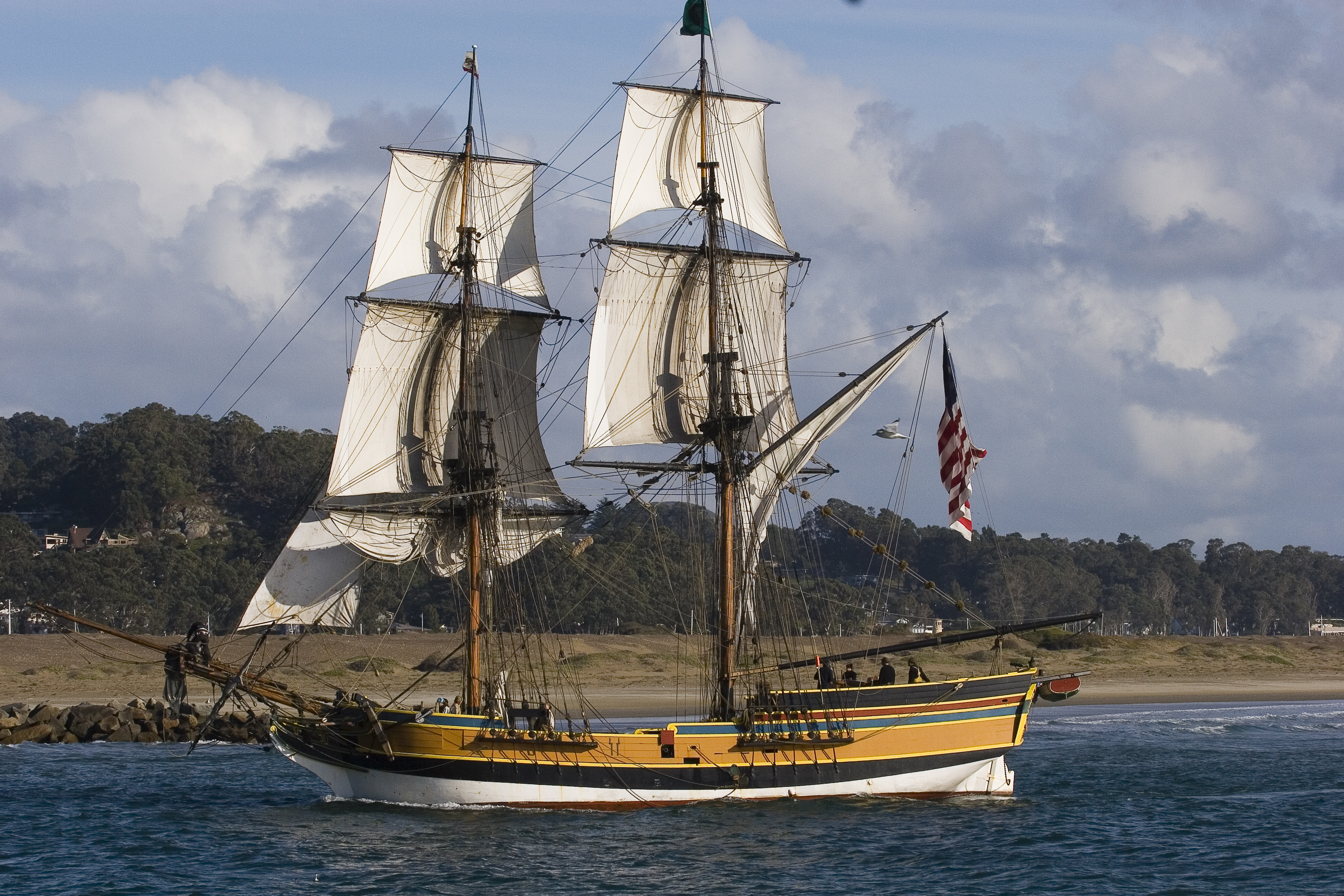
Lady Washington on Morro Bay in California

A ship replica of Lady Washington was built in Aberdeen, Washington, United States in time for the 1989 Washington State Centennial celebrations. Aberdeen is located on Grays Harbor, an inlet of the Pacific Ocean named for Robert Gray, the man who entered the harbor under sail for the first time as master of Columbia.

The ship was designed by marine expert Ray Wallace and built by Richard Miles. Wallace is also known for designing the Sailing Ship Columbia in Disneyland alongside Admiral Joe Fowler.

Named "Washington State's Tall Ship Ambassador", as well as the State Ship, the new Lady Washington is operated by a professional and volunteer crew under the auspices of the Grays Harbor Historical Seaport Authority. She sails up and down the Pacific coast, educating students in the history of merchant trading, life of common sailors, and responsibilities of the ship's officers.

The current replica's mainmast is rigged with a topgallant sail and topsail above a gaff mainsail, as based on the post-Macau refit configuration. Old World (UK/international) terminology refers to this sail plan as brigantine, and New World (American) terminology refers to this as a brig.

=== Film and television appearances ===
Lady Washington has appeared and served as a set in various films and television series.

- The brig Enterprise, a namesake of the Starship Enterprise, on the holodeck in Star Trek Generations.
- The ship used to transport Chinese immigrants to America in the IMAX film The Great American West
- The reference ship for the animated RLS Legacy in the Disney film Treasure Planet
- HMS Interceptor in the film Pirates of the Caribbean: The Curse of the Black Pearl
- As Queen Anne's Revenge in the miniseries Blackbeard
- Captain Hook's ship Jolly Roger in Once Upon a Time
- A recurring background piece in Revolution
- The Queen Anne's Revenge in "The Curse of the Earth Totem" episode of DC's Legends of Tomorrow
- Appeared in S01 E04 of Prop Culture while talking about filming Pirates of the Caribbean: The Curse of the Black Pearl

Outside of film and television, the ship serves as the central visual element for the Christian music group For KING & COUNTRY in their music video "Burn the Ships". She also appeared in the music video for rapper Macklemore's "Can't Hold Us".

== See also ==
- USS Lady Washington (1776)
