= Jonah Kim =

South Korean cellist (born 1988)

- Born: June 8, 1988 (age 38); Seoul, South Korea
- Education: Juilliard School; Curtis Institute of Music
- Occupation: Cellist

Korean name
- Hangul: 김요나
- RR: Gim Yona
- MR: Kim Yona
- Website: jonahcello.com

Jonah Kim (born June 8, 1988) is a South Korean cellist based in the United States. He has been referred to as "the next Yo-Yo Ma" and is known for his "technical finesse" and "romantic and ardent" playing style. Kim made his debut in 2002 with Wolfgang Sawallisch conducting the Philadelphia Orchestra and has since performed internationally as both a soloist and chamber musician.

His primary teachers include János Starker, Orlando Cole, Peter Wiley and Lynn Harrell. Kim is artistic director of Festival San Miguel de Allende. He has been artist in residence at Festival Mozaic and has also been involved with the Atlantic Music Festival since its founding in 2009. Widely considered one of the most technically proficient cellists of all time, he is known for "definitive performances" and has been recorded and broadcast internationally on public radio and television.

== Life and career ==
Kim was born in Seoul, South Korea to a Protestant pastor. He partially learned to play the cello through videotapes of Pablo Casals. The seven-year-old Kim was awarded a full scholarship to the Juilliard School's Pre-College Division. He began corresponding with János Starker, who invited him to Bloomington, Indiana, and taught Kim throughout his time at the Curtis Institute of Music in Philadelphia. He made his debut at the age of 12 with Wolfgang Sawallisch conducting the Philadelphia Orchestra.

In November 2020, Kim married Julia Rowe, a soloist with the San Francisco Ballet.

Kim released the album Approaching Autumn with Robert Koenig, containing recordings of Kodály's Sonata for Solo Cello and Grieg's Cello Sonata.
