= The Great American West =

1997 film

The Great American West is a 1997 film narrated by Jason Robards and recorded in the IMAX film format depicting the period of the American West's development between the Louisiana Purchase and the start of the 20th century.

Filmed on dramatic visual locations such as Monument Valley, Grand Tetons, the Olympic Peninsula, and the California Redwoods, this movie tells the stories of successive waves of westward emigration, feature the stories of Lewis and Clark, Hugh Glass, the Oregon Trail, Chinese laborers arriving by ship, and more.

Jason Robards' narration is drawn from historical letters and journals.
