= Tower of Unity =

Coordinates: 51°06′44″N 10°11′56″E

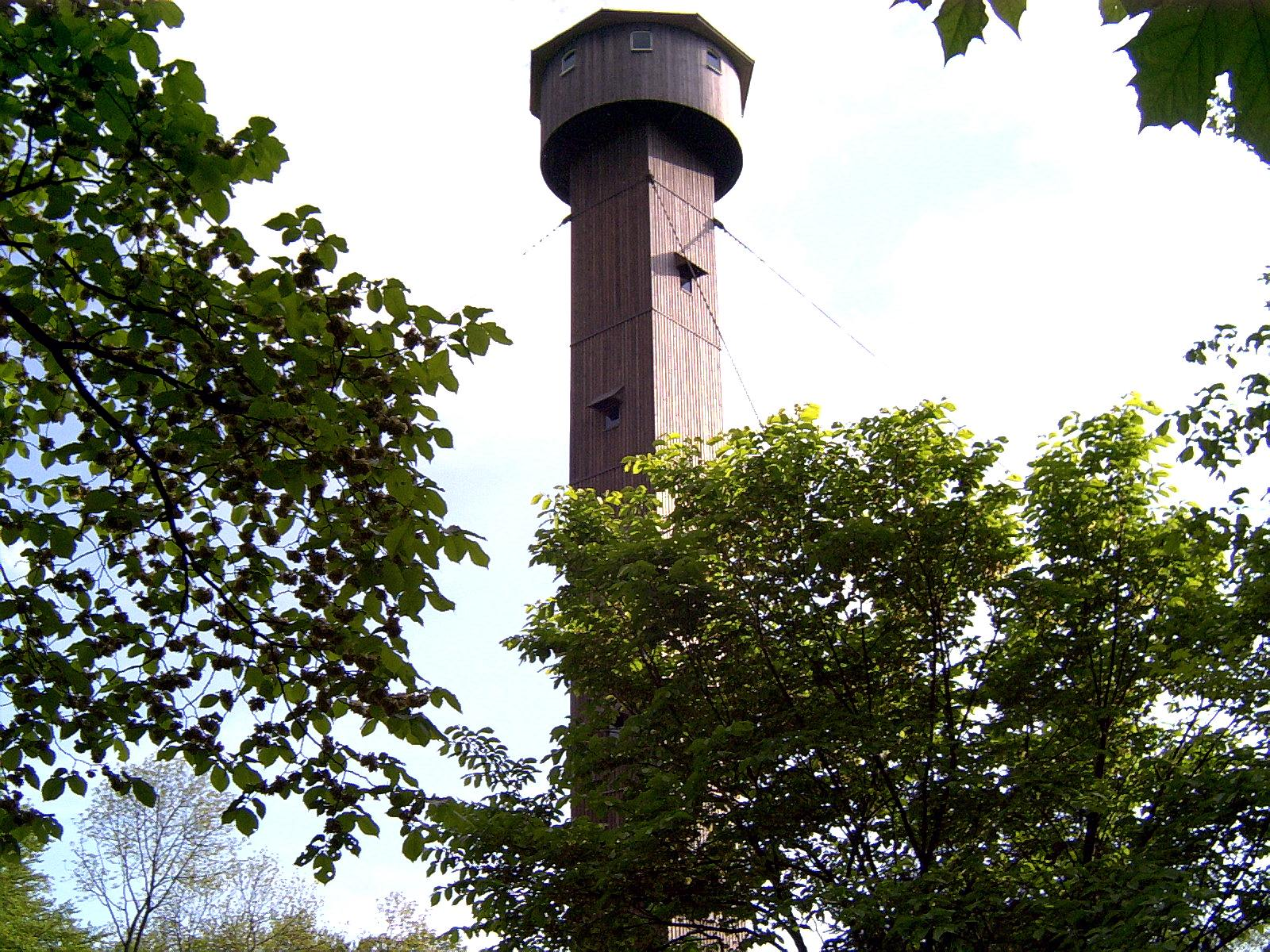

The Tower of Unity (German: Turm der Einheit) is a 30-meter-high (98 ft) observation tower on Heldrastein, a rocky mountain belonging to Treffurt in Thuringia. The tower of Unity has an unusual history and is also from unusual design, because it is additionally guyed by anchoring wires, although it is actually free standing. The tower of Unity was built in 1962 as transmitting tower for a radar station. At that time it was an open steel lattice tower additionally guyed with the radar facility on its top. The area of this tower was not accessible for tourists at those days as it laid in the restricted area of the former border between West and East Germany. In 1989, when the border was opened, the area became again accessible for the public and the desire developed to build on Heldrastein again an observation tower, as there was until 1952 an observation tower built of stones, the such called Carl Alexander tower there. In 1996 finally permission for the transformation of the radar tower into an observation tower could be received. In order to do this changes, which cost 205,000 DM, the radome on the top was removed and the tower body was covered with wood. In addition the tower got a stairway with 166 steps and an octagonal shelter at the tower basement.

== Literature ==
- Interessengemeinschaft Heldrastein (Herausgeber): Der Heldrastein. Ringgau-Datterode, 1997 ISBN 3-930342-06-5, 256 S.

== See also ==
- List of towers
