= Painter Hall =

Building of the University of Texas at Austin

Coordinates: 30.2871°N 97.7386°W

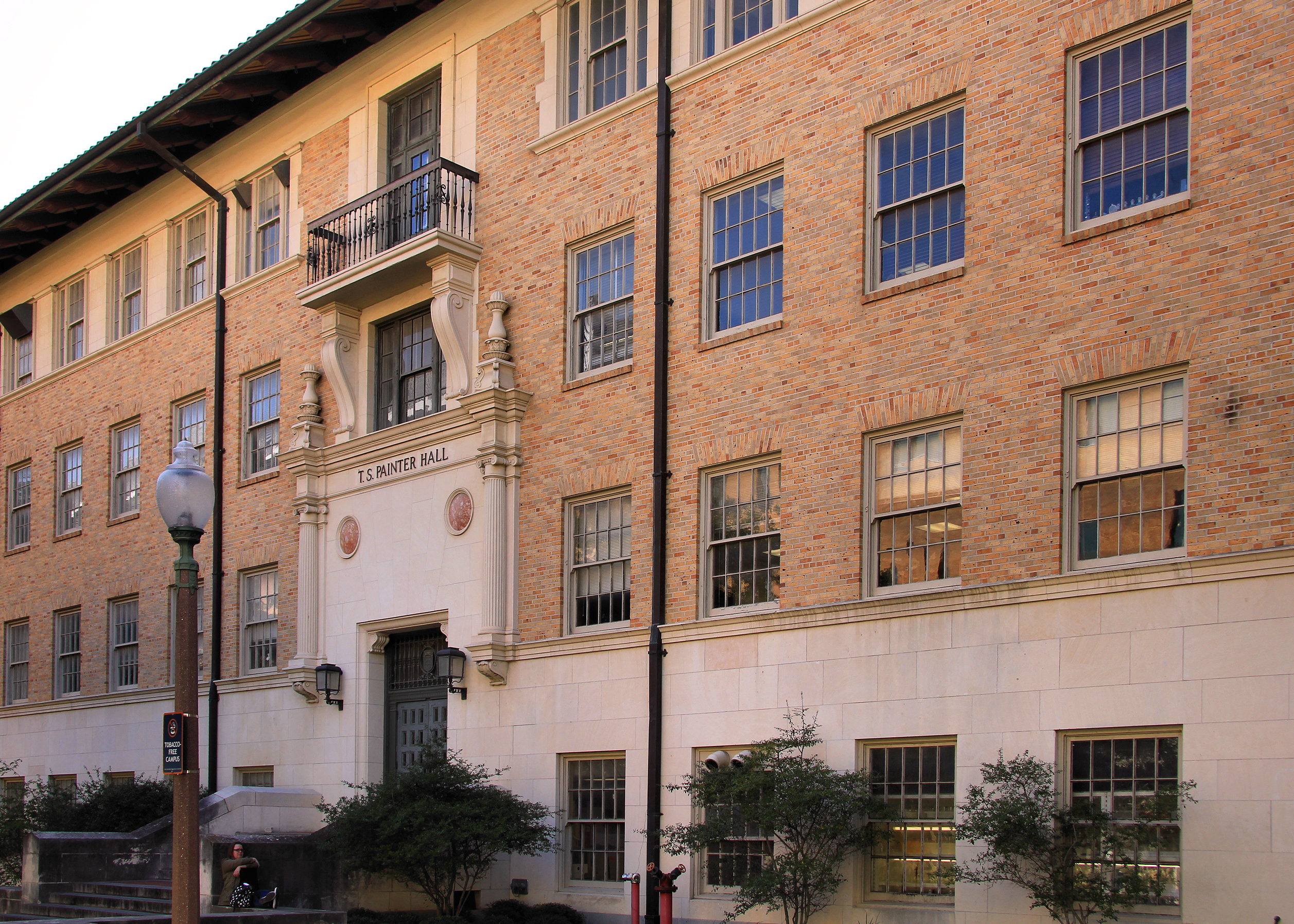
- The building's exterior in 2014
- Interactive map of the Painter Hall area
- Former names: Physics Building
- Alternative names: PAI

General information
- Location: 103 West 24th Street, Austin, Texas, United States
- Named for: Theophilus Painter
- Owner: University of Texas at Austin

Technical details
- Floor count: 7
- Floor area: 129,358 acres (52,349 ha)

Painter Hall (abbreviated PAI; formerly the Physics Building) is an academic building located on the University of Texas at Austin campus. Named after Theophilus Painter, the UT President from 1944 to 1952, the building was constructed in 1933, expanded in 1957 and remodeled in 1974. Currently, the building has seven floors and spans around 130 thousand total square feet.

Painter Hall is a large center of scientific research at UT Austin, containing parts of the departments of astronomy, neuroscience, nutritional sciences, and physics. Similarly, it includes much of the College of Natural Sciences and several informational offices. The building is also home to the university's UTeach and FRI programs. Painter Hall also has connections to the public. While the university is in session, the Department of Astronomy hosts free weekend viewings on the Painter Hall Telescope.
