= University of Texas at Austin College of Natural Sciences =

College of Natural Sciences
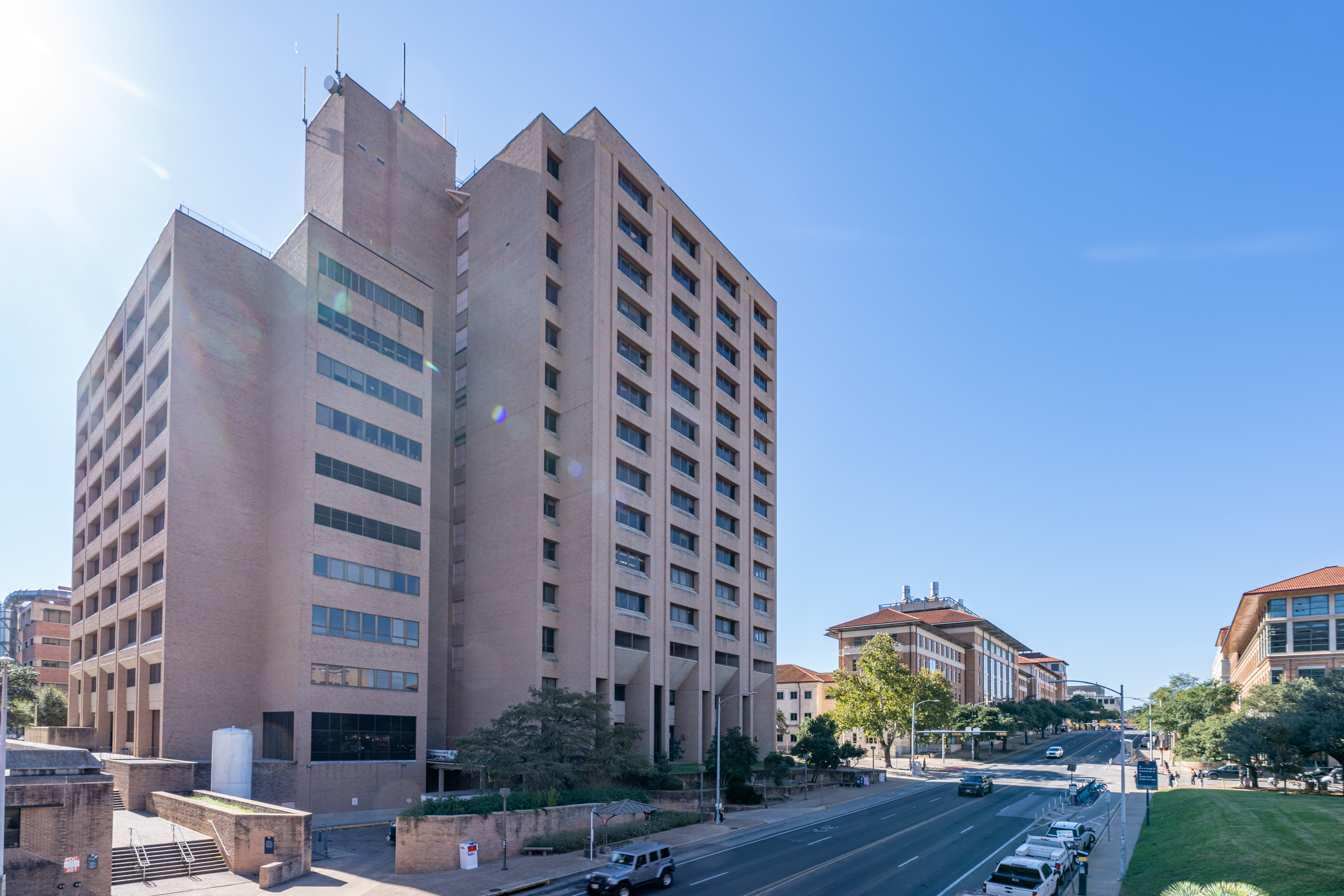
- Established: 1970
- Parent institution: University of Texas at Austin
- Dean: David Vanden Bout
- Academic staff: 760
- Students: 17,264
- Undergraduates: 11,320
- Location: Austin, Texas, United States
- Website: cns.utexas.edu

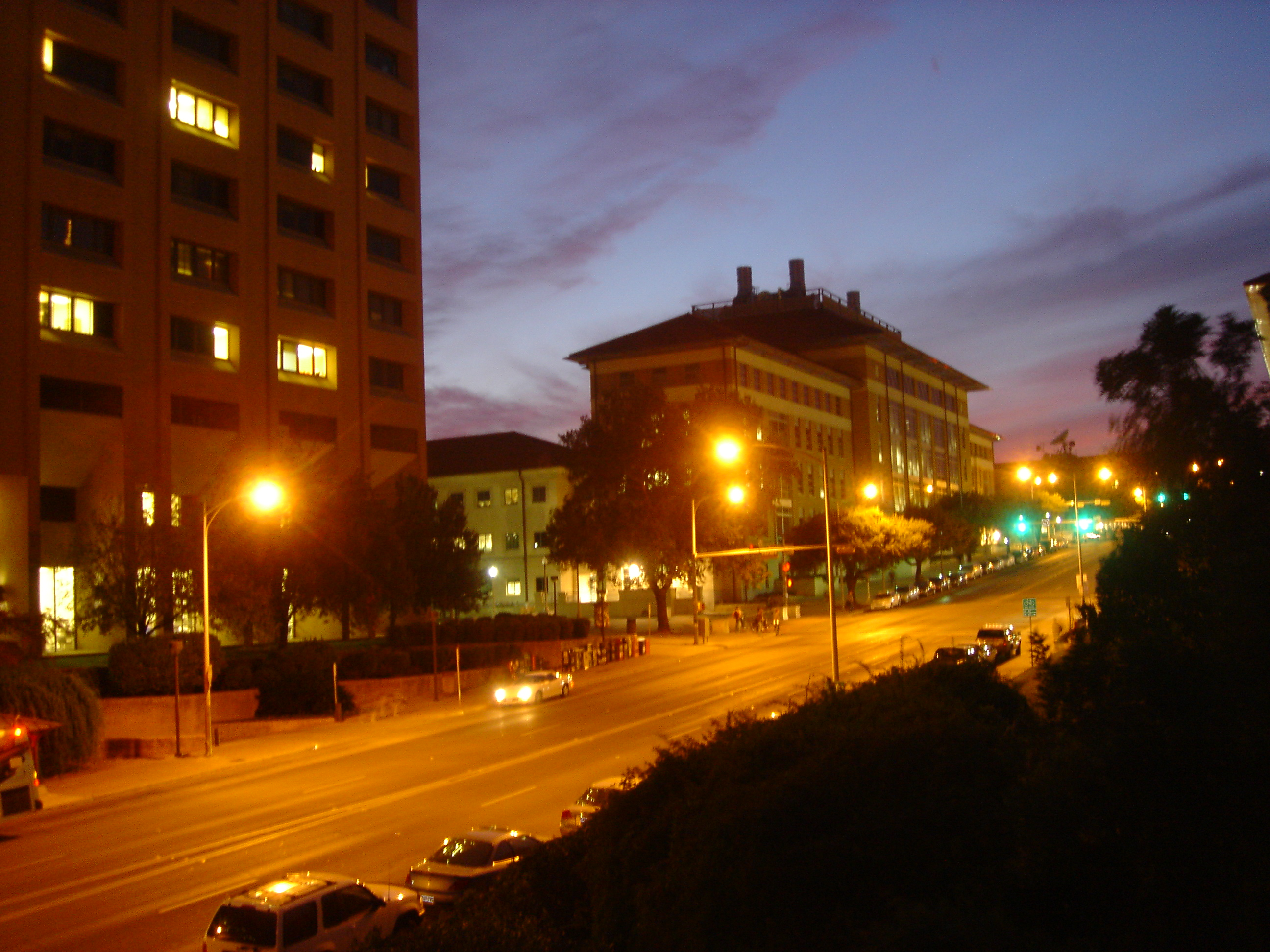
The Physics, Math, and Astronomy Building (left), the Molecular Biology Building (middle), and the Neuromolecular Sciences Building (right).

The College of Natural Sciences at The University of Texas at Austin offers 16 undergraduate majors and 20 graduate programs to more than 11,000 undergraduates and 1,400 graduate students. The college employs over 370 faculty. It was established in 1883.

== Departments, Schools and Programs ==
- Department of Astronomy
- Department of Chemistry
- School of Computing
- Department of Computer Science
- Department of Human Development and Family Sciences
- School of Health and Human Sciences
- Department of Integrative Biology
- Department of Information (iSchool)
- Department of Marine Science
- Department of Mathematics
- Department of Molecular Biosciences
- Department of Neuroscience
- Department of Nutritional Sciences
- Department of Physics
- Department of Statistics and Data Science
- Freshman Research Initiative
- UTeach

== Homework System ==
The College of Natural Sciences has an online assignment submission system unique to this college, known as Quest Learning and Assessment. The Quest system allows professors to add assignments and allows students to access and provide all answers to those assignments online. Furthermore, the commonly used in-class response system, iClicker, can be linked onto this website, allowing students to keep track of their progress throughout the class in one place.

== Honors Programs ==
The College of Natural Sciences administers several honors programs at the University of Texas at Austin.

The Dean's Scholars Honors Program accepts about 30 freshmen and 20 sophomores each fall, maintaining a size of more than 200 total undergraduates. The Dean's Scholars Student Association is elected to represent the program in college affairs.

The Health Science Honors (HSH) Program is for students specifically interested in the health professions. It accepts about 50 students per year.

The Turing Scholars Honors Program accepts outstanding computer science majors each fall, and is represented by the Turing Scholars Student Association. It is also possible for an undergraduate to double-major in Dean's Scholars and Turing Scholars.

Polymathic Scholars (PS) is the certificate program for honors students in the College of Natural Sciences with interests that stretch beyond their major.

The School of Health and Human Sciences offers two honors program options for highly motivated students: "Honors in Advanced Human Development and Family Sciences" and "Honors in Advanced Nutritional Sciences."

== Notable faculty ==
- Allen J. Bard, winner of the 2002 Priestley Medal, co-winner of the 2008 Wolf Prize in Chemistry, winner of the National Medal of Science (2011) and winner of the Enrico Fermi Award (2014)
- Luis Caffarelli, winner of the Rolf Schock Prize award (2005), the Wolf Prize in Mathematics (2012), the Shaw Prize (2018), and the Abel Prize (2023)
- E. Allen Emerson, winner of the 2007 Turing Award
- David Hillis, winner of a MacArthur Fellowship (1999)
- Allan H. MacDonald, winner of the Wolf Prize in Physics (2020), the Kavli Prize (2026) and the BBVA Foundation Frontiers of Knowledge prize (2026).
- Jason McLellan, winner of a MacArthur Fellowship (2025) and inductee in the National Inventors Hall of Fame (2025)
- Nancy A. Moran, winner of a MacArthur Fellowship (1997)
- Philip Treisman, winner of a MacArthur Fellowship (1992)
- Karen Uhlenbeck, winner of a MacArthur Fellowship (1983), the National Medal of Science (2000), the Abel Prize (2019) and the Steele Prize (2020).
- Steven Weinberg, winner of the 1979 Nobel Prize in Physics and the National Medal of Science (1991)
- John Archibald Wheeler, winner of the 1997 Wolf Prize in Physics
- C. Grant Willson, winner of the National Medal of Technology and Innovation (2007), the Japan Prize (2013) and the Charles Stark Draper Prize (2020)

== Student organizations ==
- Natural Sciences Council was started in 1972 to serve as a liaison between the students in the College and the Natural Sciences faculty. Also serves as a liaison to the Senate of College Councils
- Science Undergraduate Research Group that works to foster a cohesive undergraduate research community
