= UTeach =

Teacher certification program

UTeach is a teacher certification program administered by the College of Natural Sciences and the College of Education at the University of Texas at Austin. It was created in 1997 to address both the shortage of qualified secondary mathematics, science, and computer science teachers as well as the quality of those entering the field.

The program has been well-received, cited by the National Academy of Sciences as a model program addressing the need for more highly qualified mathematics and science teachers.

UTeach has been a model for mathematics and science education programs at other institutions, and has been expanded to involve an additional forty-four universities in twenty-one states by 2019.

2008-2012 (cohort 1)
Florida State University
Louisiana State University
Northern Arizona University
Temple University
University of California, Berkeley
University of California, Irvine
University of Colorado Boulder
University of Florida
University of Houston
University of Kansas
University of North Texas
University of Texas at Dallas
Western Kentucky University
2010-2014 (cohort 2)
Cleveland State University
Middle Tennessee State University
University of Colorado Colorado Springs
University of Memphis
University of Tennessee, Chattanooga
University of Tennessee, Knoxville
University of Texas, Arlington
University of Texas at Tyler
2011-2015 (cohort 3)
Columbus State University
Southern Polytechnic State University
University of Massachusetts, Lowell
University of West Georgia
2012-2016 (cohort 4)
Boise State University
Florida Institute of Technology
Towson University
University of Arkansas at Fayetteville
University of Arkansas at Little Rock
University of Central Arkansas
University of Texas at Brownsville
University of Texas, Pan American
2013-2018 (cohort 5)
Drexel University
Florida International University
University of Maryland, College Park
Oklahoma State University
Old Dominion University
University of Alabama, Birmingham
2015-2019 (cohort 6)
George Washington University
Louisiana Tech University
University of Massachusetts, Boston
University of Nevada, Reno
West Virginia University
