= Freshman Research Initiative =

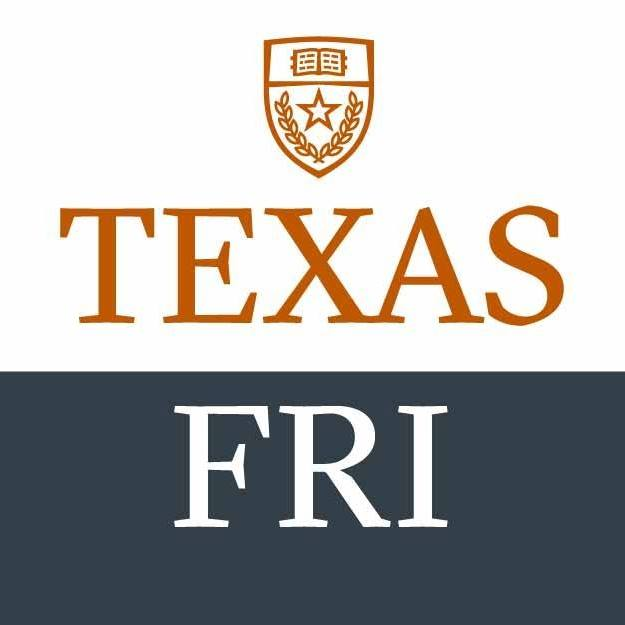
- Founded: 2005
- Purpose: Education Through Research
- Location: The University of Texas at Austin
- Students: 1000/year
- Website: https://cns.utexas.edu/fri

The Freshman Research Initiative (FRI), developed at the University of Texas at Austin, gives first-year students in the College of Natural Sciences the opportunity to conduct research in chemistry, biochemistry, nanotechnology, molecular biology, physics, astronomy and computer sciences.

The pilot program started with 43 students in three Research Streams. Currently, about 1000 freshmen each year are enrolled in 35 different Research Streams within FRI. Each Research Stream (laboratory) is led by a faculty member who provides guidance to their respective Research Streams, set goals and directions, and develop and teach the Research Experience courses to the students within their stream. Each Research Stream has its own dedicated lab, which is run by a research scientist dedicated to the stream. Major funding for this program was provided by National Science Foundation and Howard Hughes Medical Institute.

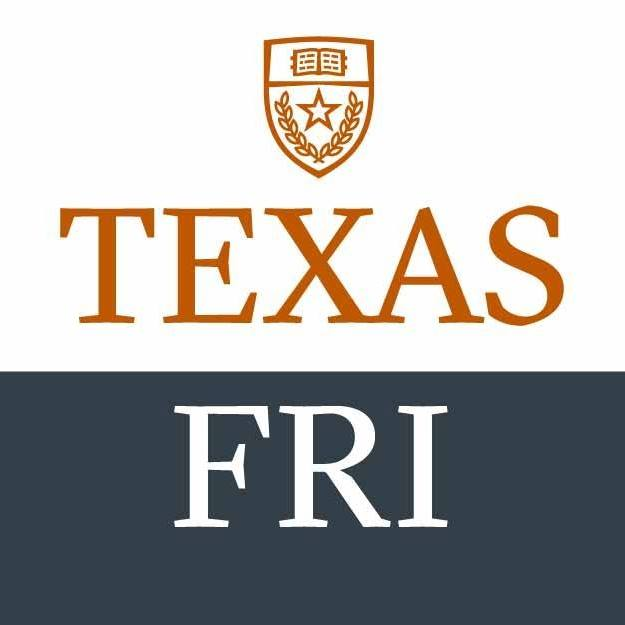
Logo for the Freshman Research Initiative (FRI) Program

Students who participate in the FRI are 30-35% more likely to graduate with a science degree and 23% more likely to go to graduate school. In addition the program is significantly boosting the number of underrepresented students majoring in science, and approximately 103 students have been included as authors of published research papers.
