= Moody College of Communication =

American college at the University of Texas at Austin

Coordinates: 30.289125°N 97.740775°W

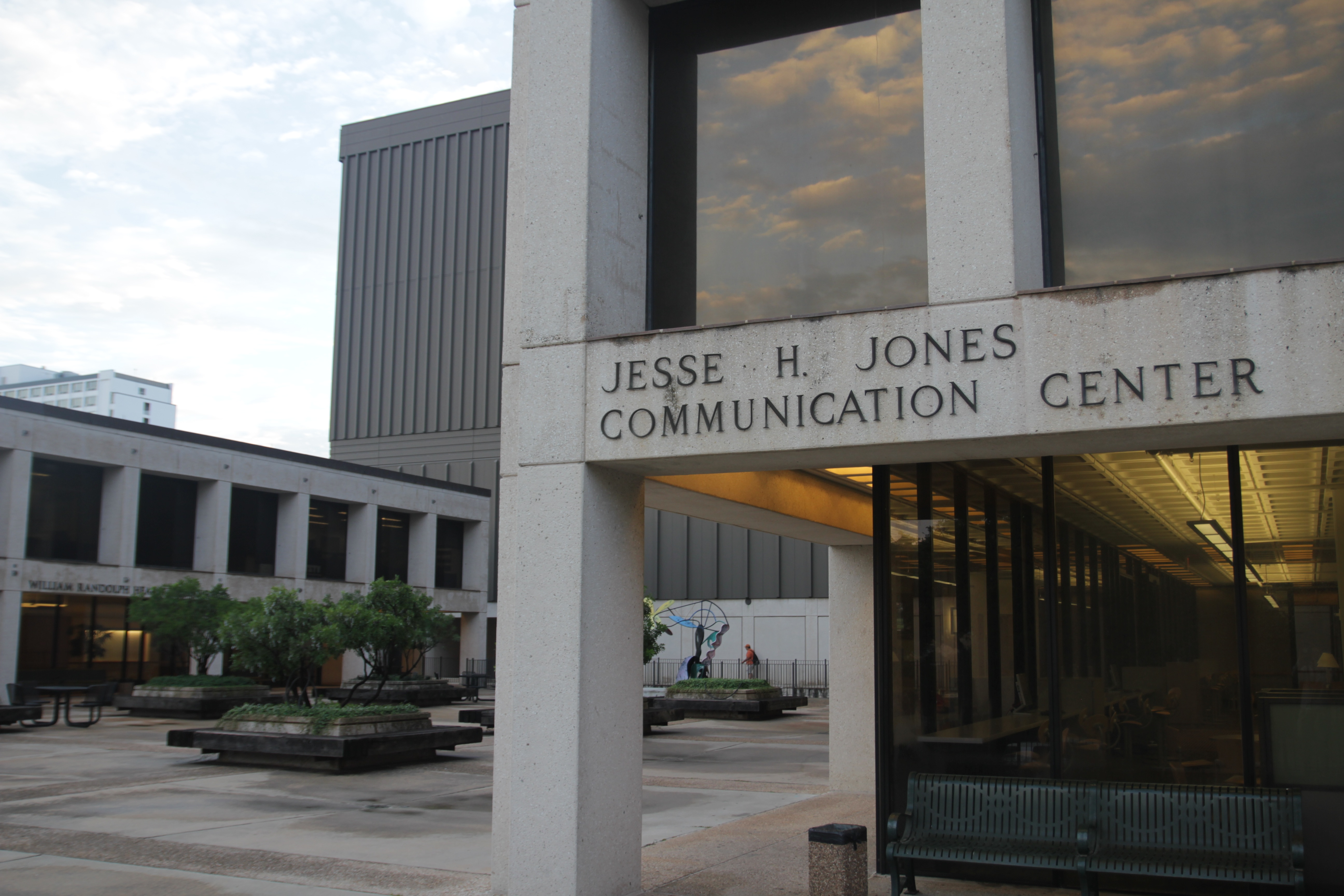
- Established: 1965; 61 years ago
- Parent institution: University of Texas at Austin
- Dean: Rachel Davis Mersey
- Faculty: 125
- Students: 4,375
- Undergraduates: 3,837
- Postgraduates: 538
- Location: Austin, Texas, United States
- Website: moody.utexas.edu

The Moody College of Communication is the communication college at The University of Texas at Austin. The Moody College of Communication operates out of the Jesse H. Jones Communication Complex and the Dealey Center for New Media, which opened in November 2012.

== History ==
The Department of Public Speaking, now the Department of Communication Studies, at UT Austin was established in 1899, and the School of Journalism began in 1914, moving into its own building in 1952. An early interest in broadcasting on campus resulted in the formation of the Department of Radio-Television-Film. In 1921, a radio station was established to conduct experimental work in radio communication, and by the 1930s what was probably the first television broadcast in Texas originated on the campus. The first degree program in broadcasting began in 1939. Established in 1941 with the founding of The University of Texas at Austin Speech and Hearing Clinic and the introduction of coursework leading to Texas Education Agency certification, the program of Communication Sciences and Disorders is the oldest program of its kind in the state of Texas.

In 1965, the School of Journalism, the Department of Speech, and a newly formed Department of Radio-Television-Film became the three departments officially organized as the School of Communication. DeWitt Carter Reddick was appointed to be the school's first dean. In that same year, the accredited sequence of advertising in the Department of Journalism was established as a separate Department of Advertising. Originally housed in the Department of Speech Communication, a separate Department of Communication Sciences and Disorders was established in 1998.

In the 1990s and early 2000s, Austin had become a filmmaking hub due in part to several Communications alumni including Robert Rodriguez and leading many people in the industry to begin calling Austin the "Third Coast" for film. This has spurred the Radio-Television-Film department on to national recognition, while also giving students more opportunities for internships and jobs after matriculation.

On November 7, 2013, the Moody Foundation of Galveston announced a $50 million commitment to establish the Moody College of Communication at The University of Texas at Austin, resulting in the largest endowment for the study of communication of any public university in the nation.

== Campus ==
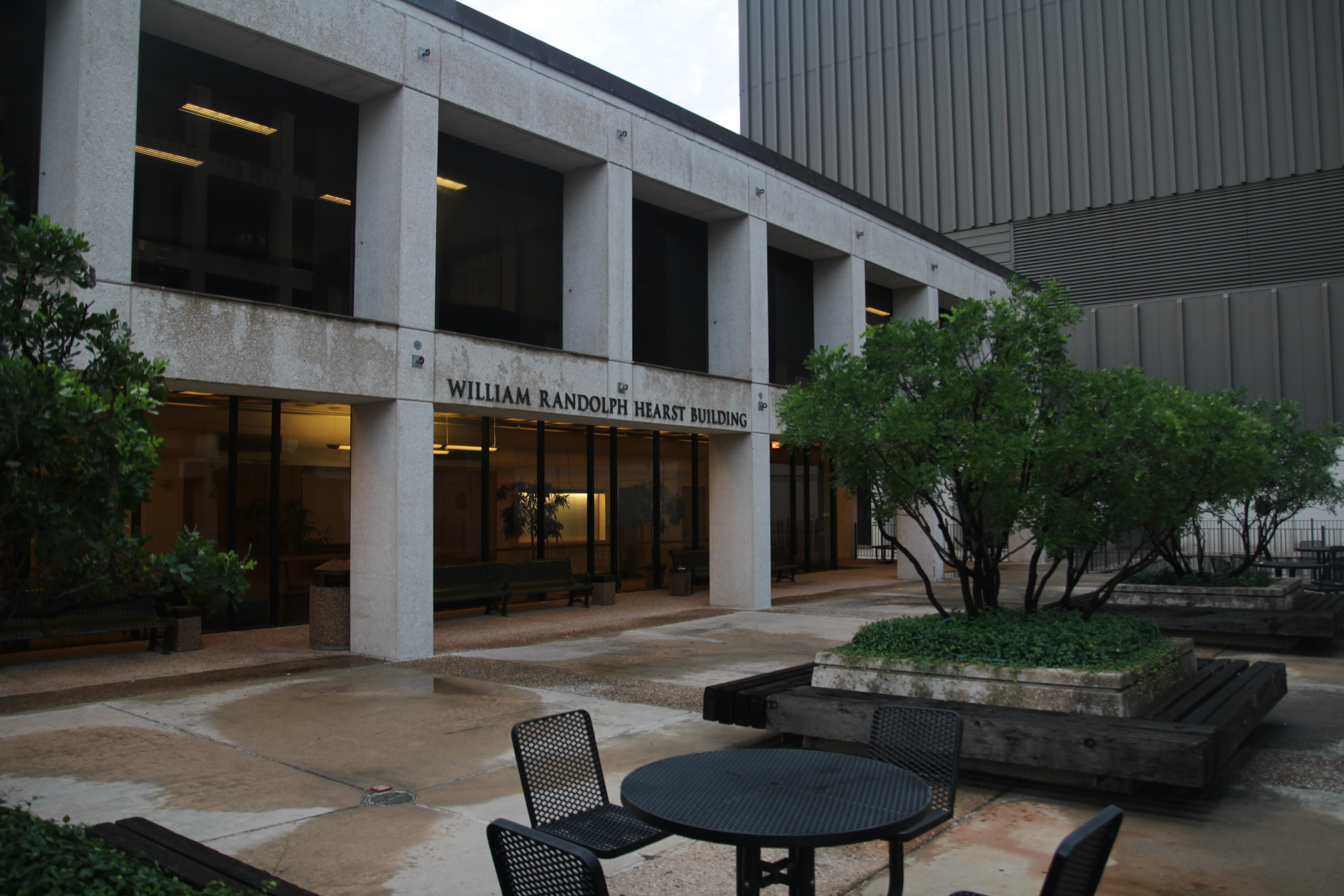
The Texas Student Media building was officially renamed the William Randolph Hearst Building in 2009, after a significant donation from the Hearst Corporation.

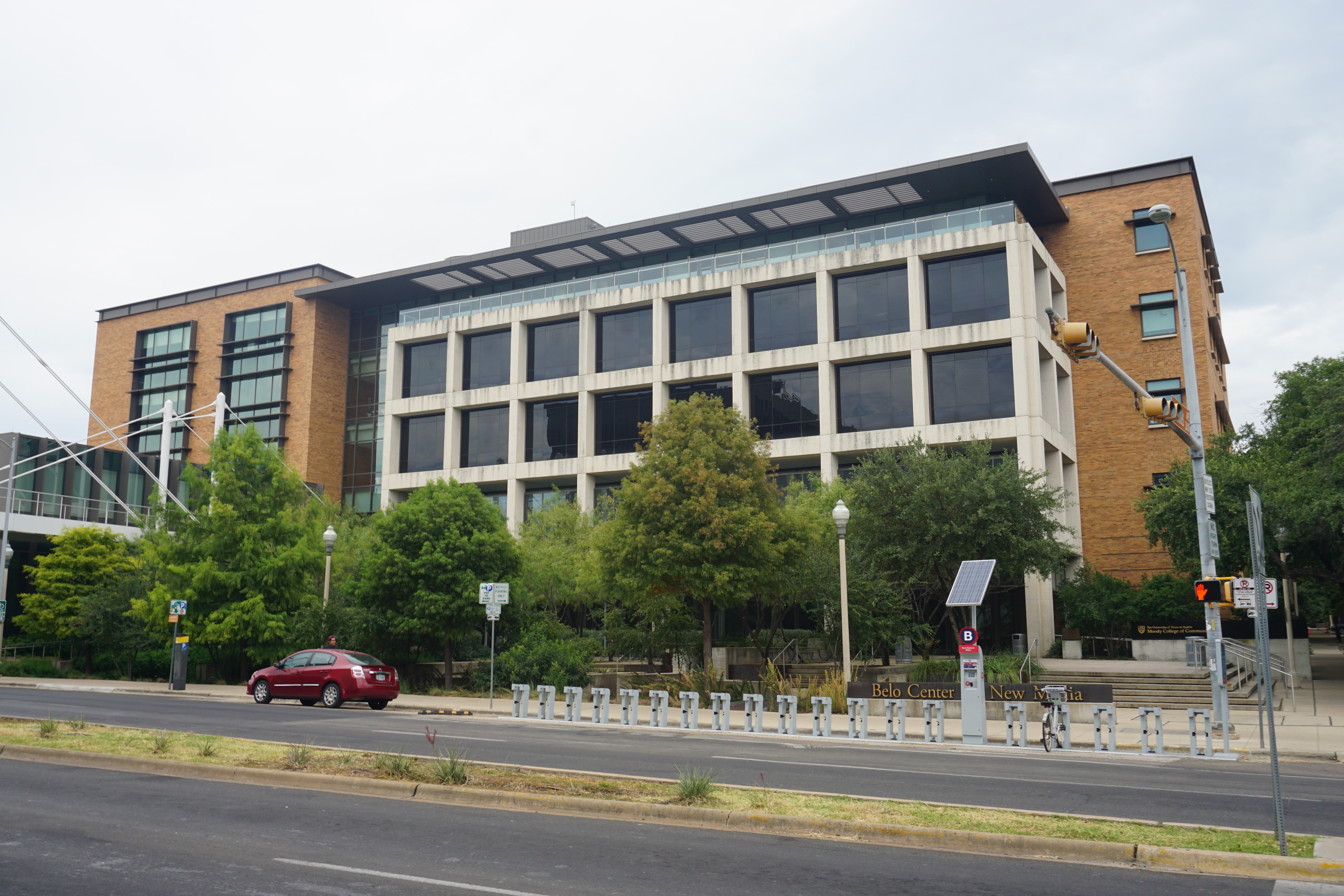
Belo Center for New Media

The campus of the Moody College of Communication sits in a complex on the north west side of UT's campus, adjacent to The Drag and just north of the Littlefield House. There was no formal definition of the Moody Communication campus until all communication's studies were consolidated in the late 1960s. Construction of a three-building communication complex began in 1968, and the three Departments of Journalism, Radio-Television-Film and Speech Communication moved into new facilities in 1974.

In 2007, the first new construction project for the school in over 30 years was announced after a $15 million donation from the Belo Foundation: the Belo Center for New Media augmented teaching and research space for the college with a new building on the north side of Dean Keeton Street. Construction began in May 2010, and the new Belo Center was dedicated in November 2012. The five-story, 120,000-square-foot building serves as an interactive learning space for students and a landmark gateway to campus at the intersection of Guadalupe and Dean Keeton Streets. The total project budget was $54.770 million. In June 2021, the Belo Center was renamed the G. B. Dealey Center for New Media in honor of George Bannerman Dealey. The Dealey Center is home to the KUT Public Media Studios, which houses the public radio stations KUT and KUTX.

The Texas Student Media building, formerly known as the CMC building, was officially renamed the William Randolph Hearst Building after a significant donation from the Hearst Corporation in 2008. Texas Student Television, the FCC-licensed student television station located within the Hearst Building, K29HW-D, received an $80,000 digital transmitter retrofit to comply with the mandated digital television transition in 2009.

Part of the Moody Foundation's 2013 donation was used to pay for the design and construction of the Moody Pedestrian Bridge, which links the college's departments across Dean Keeton Street.

== Academics ==
The Moody College of Communication comprises the Stan Richards School of Advertising and Public Relations; Department of Speech, Language, and Hearing Sciences; Department of Communication Studies; School of Journalism and Media; and the Department of Radio-Television-Film. Moody College offers both undergraduate and graduate degrees.

=== Administration ===
Like the undergraduate portion of the University of Texas at Austin, the Moody College operates on a semester system. As part of the larger institution, the Moody College is ultimately administered by UT's president and board of trustees. The school is directly managed by a dean, currently Dean Rachel Davis Mersey, who is advised by several associate deans responsible for various aspects of the administration.

=== Organizations ===
Cactus Yearbook - The Cactus Yearbook is the university's oldest publication, dating back to 1894.

The Daily Texan - The Daily Texan is the university's student-run newspaper, publishing since 1900. It is one of largest college newspapers in the nation.

The Texas Travesty - The Texas Travesty is a student-produced satirical newspaper, founded in 1997.

KUT and KUTX - The Moody College is home to KUT FM 90.5 and KUTX FM, 98.9, National Public Radio member stations for central Texas. They are listener-supported and corporate-sponsored public radio station owned and operated by faculty and staff of the University of Texas at Austin.

KVRX - KVRX is a student-run radio station. The station began broadcasting in 1986. Today, KVRX shares its frequency with KOOP and broadcasts over the Internet 24/7.

Texas Student Television (TSTV) - TSTV is the only student-run, FCC-licensed, digitally broadcasting college television station in the country. The station began broadcasting on an analog broadcast VHF channel in 1995.

== Centers and institutes ==
The Moody College of Communication has the following centers and institutes:

- The Annette Strauss Institute For Civic Life
- Knight Center for Journalism in the Americas
- Technology and Information Policy Institute
- Voces Oral History Project
- Center for Health Communication
- Arthur M. Blank Center for Stuttering Education and Research
- Wofford Denius UTLA Center for Entertainment & Media Studies
- Speech, Debate and Forensics
- Center for Media Engagement
- Texas Immersive Institute
- Speech & Hearing Center
- Center for Sports Communication & Media
- Center for Advanced Teaching Excellence
- Center for Entertainment and Media Industries
- Center for Media Engagement
- Global Sustainability Leadership Institute
- Institute for Media Innovation
- Latino Media Arts & Studies Program
- Nelson Center for Brand and Demand Analytics
- Woolfolk Center for Language Disorders Research

=== UT Los Angeles Program ===
Founded in 2005, the UT Los Angeles Program (UTLA, Semester in Los Angeles Program) gives students the opportunity to intern in the entertainment industry while also completing upper division coursework.

== Rankings and admissions ==
Admissions for undergraduate students are handled by the university's undergraduate admissions. Along with the schools of Architecture, Business, and Engineering, admissions into the Moody College of Communication is highly selective. For this reason, many UT students apply for an internal transfer while completing their core requirements. The College leaves a designated number of spots per year for internal transfers and external transfers though official numbers are not disclosed.

Reviewing Body	Survey Name	Rank	Scope	Year
QS World University Rankings	Communication and Media Studies	4	World	2021
U.S. News & World Report	Top Speech Language Pathology Programs	10	National	2020
U.S. News & World Report	Top Audiology Programs	14	National	2020
USA Today	Best Overall Journalism Programs	3	National	2015
The Hollywood Reporter	Top Film Schools	10	National	2021
Interactive Advertising Bureau	Top Digital Advertising Programs	1	National	2013
U.S. News & World Report	Top Advertising Programs	4	National	2003
U.S. News & World Report	Top Public Relations Programs	7	National	2003'
U.S. News & World Report	Top Audiology Programs	13	National	2003
U.S. News & World Report	Top Speech Pathology Programs	12	National	2003
U.S. News & World Report	Top Print Journalism Programs	11	National	2003
U.S. News & World Report	Top Film Programs	7	National	2003
U.S. News & World Report	Top Radio-Television Programs	4	National	2003
National Communication Association	Applied Communication	Top 3	National	1996
National Communication Association	Communication Theory and Research	Top 3	National	1996
National Communication Association	Critical/Cultural Media Studies	Top 3	National	1996
National Communication Association	Organizational Communication	Top 3	National	1996
National Communication Association	Rhetoric	Top 3	National	1996

=== Longhorn Network ===
On January 19, 2011, the university announced the creation of a 24-hour television network in partnership with ESPN, dubbed the Longhorn Network. The Longhorn Network (the only partnership of its kind) gives a number of College of Communication students an opportunity to participate in internships and panel discussions that provide a first-hand look at the broadcast industry.

== People ==
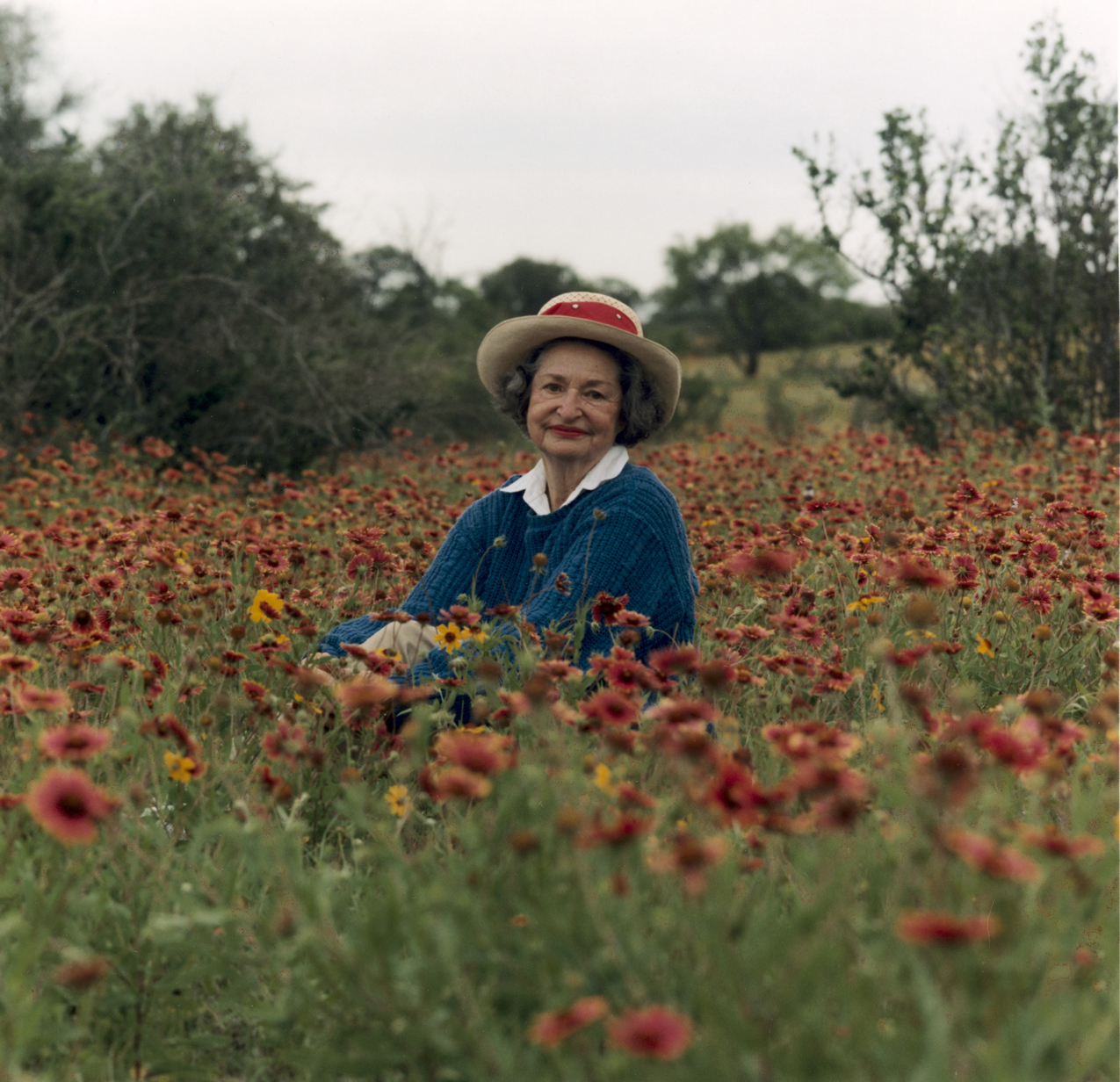
A portrait of Lady Bird Johnson in the Texas Hill Country.

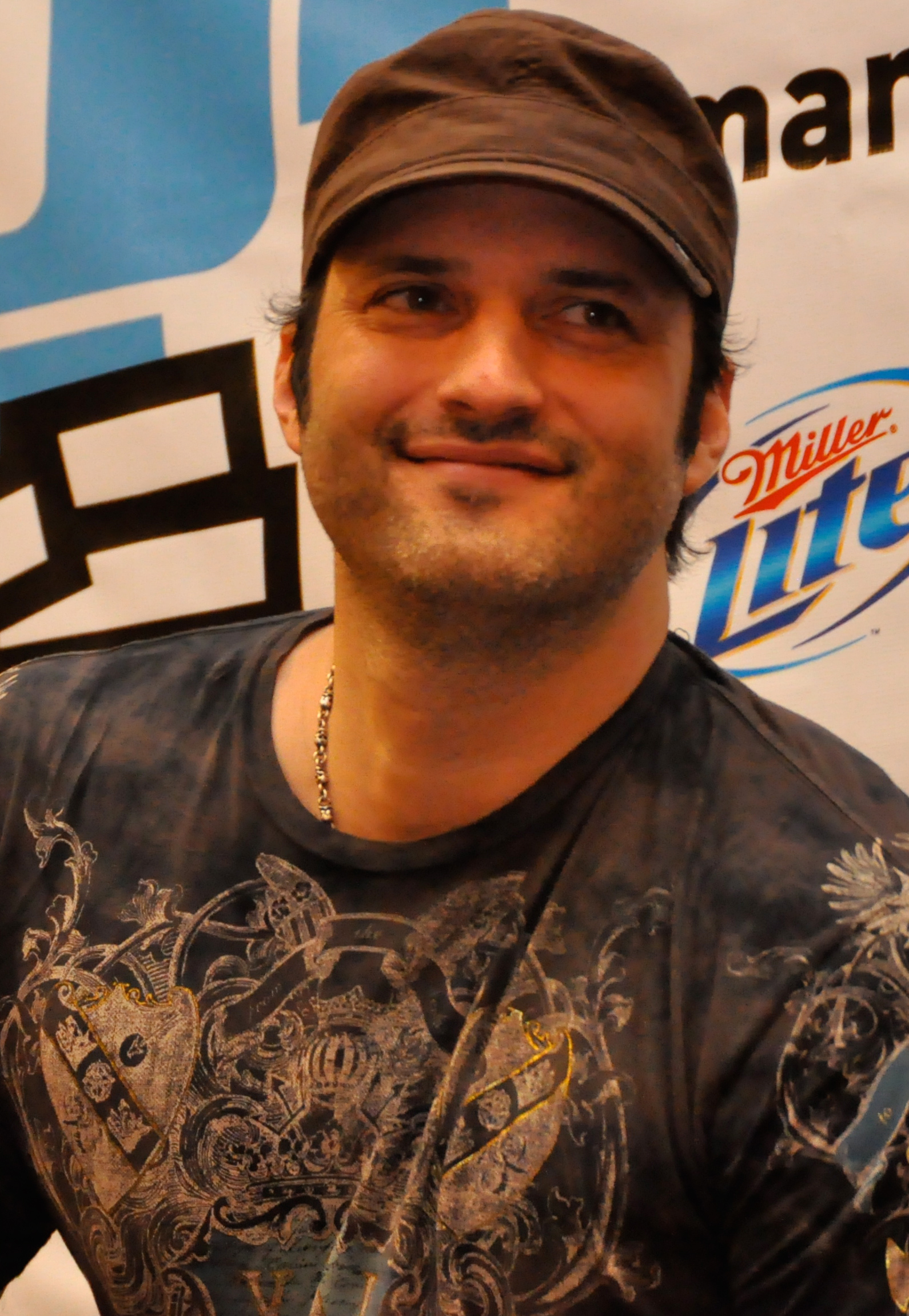
Director Robert Rodriguez answers audience questions at the South by Southwest, Austin, Texas

=== Student profile and student life ===
As of fall 2022, the Moody College of Communication has an enrollment of 4,445 undergraduates and 513 postgraduates. The Collegel offers a number of professional and community service student groups, as well as social life governance councils for the student body. As a hub for all media on campus, the Moody College has historically been at the center of major issues on campus and a nexus of school spirit. The college operates TSTV, one of the few FCC licensed television stations entirely run by students. The station has interviewed several persons of note in the past including Pauly Shore, Mark Cuban, and Dennis Quaid.

=== Faculty ===
Professors include distinguished scholars and those who have had successful careers independent of the Moody College as filmmakers, journalists, audiologists, speech language pathologists, and industry leaders.

== Alumni ==
The Moody College has matriculated many distinguished alumni including Walter Cronkite, Lady Bird Johnson, and Matthew McConaughey. Individuals associated with the Moody College have received 34 Pulitzer Prizes, three Oscars, and 42 Emmys. In 2008, Robert Rodriguez graduated from the college with a BS in Radio-Television-Film, and was the University of Texas at Austin Spring 2009 Wide-Commencement Speaker. The Moody College has also been the starting place for many famous cartoonists including Ben Sargent, Roy Crane, and Berkeley Breathed who had all drawn for The Daily Texan during their tenure.

=== Notable alumni ===
- Walter Cronkite (1933) - Television journalist, anchor of CBS News, multiple Emmy-winner
- Lady Bird Johnson (B.J. 1934) - Former first lady of the United States
- Liz Carpenter (B.J. 1942) - Former press secretary to Lady Bird Johnson
- Bill Moyers (B.J. 1956) - Journalist, writer and producer, multiple Emmy-winner
- Oscar Griffin Jr. (B.J. 1958) - Journalist, Pulitzer Prize-winner
- James C. Oberwetter (B.J. 1969) - Former press secretary to George H. W. Bush; Ambassador to Saudi Arabia
- Karen Elliott House (B.J. 1970) - Journalist, editor and publisher of The Wall Street Journal, Pulitzer Prize-winner
- Lynn Marie Latham (B.S. 1970) - Producer, writer, Emmy-winner
- Ben Sargent (B.J. 1970) - Political cartoonist, Pulitzer Prize-winner
- Honorable Judith Zaffirini (M.A. 1970, Ph.D. '78) - Texas state senator
- George Christian (B.J. 1971) - Press secretary to Lyndon B. Johnson
- Tommy Schlamme (B.S. 1972) - Director and executive producer, Emmy-winner
- Gayle Reaves (B.J. 1974) - Journalist, Pulitzer Prize-winner
- Bill Geddie (B.S. 1977) - Executive producer of ABC Television, Emmy-winner
- Admiral William H. McRaven (B.J. 1977) - Chancellor, University of Texas System; U.S. Navy commander, directed raid that led to the death of Osama bin Laden
- Larry C. Price (B.J. 1977) - Photojournalist, multiple Pulitzer Prize-winner
- Michael Zinberg (B.S. 1977) - Screenwriter, producer, director, Emmy Award-nominee
- Dan Malone (B.J. 1978) - Journalist, Pulitzer Prize-winner
- Berkeley Breathed (B.J. 1979) - Cartoonist, Pulitzer Prize-winner
- Earl Campbell (B.S. 1979) - Athlete, Heisman Trophy-winner
- Eileen Welsome (B.J. 1980) - Journalist, Pulitzer Prize-winner
- Mark Dooley (B.J. 1982) - Journalist, Pulitzer Prize-winner
- Carolyn Cole (B.J. 1983) - Photojournalist, Pulitzer Prize-winner
- Shraga Simmons (B.J. 1983) - Prominent rabbi and author
- Arthel Neville (B.J. 1986) - Television journalist
- John McConnico (B.J. 1987, M.A. '94) - Journalist, Pulitzer Prize-winner
- Matthew McConaughey (B.S. 1993) - Actor, producer, Golden Globe and Academy Award winner
- Michael Jenkins (B.J. 1995, M.A. '96) - Sports journalist, Emmy-winner
- Betty Nguyen (B.J. 1995) - Television journalist, Emmy-winner
- Robert Rodriguez (B.S. 2008) - Director, producer
- Kovid Gupta (B.S. 2010) - Screenwriter, author, social activist
- Noël Wells (B.S. 2010) - Actress, comedian, former SNL cast member
