= DeWitt Carter Reddick =

American journalist (1904–80)

DeWitt Carter Reddick (July 30, 1904 – August 22, 1980) was a Texas journalist and professor who served as the first dean of the College of Communication at the University of Texas. In a career spanning six decades, Reddick instructed many notable journalists and is credited with helping to bring a professional spirit to the business of journalism.

== Family and education ==
Reddick was born in Savannah, Georgia, on July 30, 1904, the second son of Walter Reddick and Frances (Westermann) Reddick. Walter Reddick abandoned his family when his sons were still young, and DeWitt moved to Fort Worth, Texas, with his mother, brother, and grandmother in 1905. Frances Reddick remarried in 1908 to David L. Jacks, but the two divorced in 1914. She died in 1918 of the Spanish flu, leaving DeWitt and his brother Walter on their own.

Reddick's association with the news business began early as he worked selling newspapers during grade school in Fort Worth. In high school, he worked in the mail room and as an office boy at the Fort Worth Star-Telegram. Reddick graduated from Fort Worth's Central High School in 1921 with high honors. After a year at Texas A&M University, Reddick transferred to the University of Texas at Austin (UT) as a sophomore in 1922. He and his brother worked several jobs to put themselves through college, and Reddick earned a bachelor's degree in journalism from UT in 1925.

As an undergraduate, he served as editor of the literary journal, Longhorn, and was credited with revitalizing and popularizing it. Beginning before his graduation and continuing afterward, Reddick worked as reporter on the Star-Telegram and the Austin American. From September 1926 to June 1927, he joined several other recent graduates in a voyage around the world in a so-called "floating university," writing a number of articles about the trip for American newspapers.

== Professor and dean ==
In 1927, Reddick became an instructor in journalism at the University of Texas's school of business administration, while also writing as a part-time correspondent for The Christian Science Monitor. He would remain at the university, in various positions, for the rest of his career. The following year, Reddick joined the University Presbyterian Church in Austin and earned a master's degree in government from UT. In 1934, he married Marjorie Bryan of Cleburne, Texas, a schoolteacher and fellow UT graduate. They would go on to have two children and would remain married until his death.

A vote among UT students named Reddick the school's most popular professor in 1935. In 1938, he wrote "Journalism and the School Paper," a journalism guide for student writers. That same year, he took a leave of absence to earn a Ph.D. in journalism from the University of Missouri, which he received the following year. Reddick was one of the first five men in the country to earn the degree. His research there included examining American journalism during the First World War, a timely subject given the outbreak of the Second World War that year. Reddick's dissertation, "The Newspaper as a Recorder of Contemporary History: A Case Study of the Reporting of the French Occupation of the Ruhr in Three American Newspapers," was completed in 1940. Shortly after returning to Austin, Reddick received another leave of absence to teach at Columbia University, where he taught feature writing and a new "orientation" course in journalism.

Reddick returned to Austin in 1942. For the next thirty-two years, he taught at UT, where his students included many notable future journalists. Among them were Walter Cronkite, Bill Moyers, Liz Carpenter, Ben Sargent, Karen Elliott House, Staley T. McBrayer, and Lady Bird Johnson. Moyers later credited Reddick for having "stoked my passion for journalism". In 1949, Reddick wrote "Modern Feature Writing," which the journal College English called "a practical and thorough introduction to the writing of feature articles for both magazines and newspapers by a teacher of long experience." Reddick founded Texas Presbyterian, the monthly magazine of the Texas synod of the Presbyterian Church, in 1953, and served as an advisor and contributor to the publication.

In 1956, he was named associate dean of the college of arts and sciences. Three years later, Reddick was picked to succeed Paul J. Thompson as director of the School of Journalism. He served in that position until 1965, when the School of Journalism was merged with the Department of Speech, and the Department of Radio-Television-Film to create a new School of Communications. Reddick was appointed as the new school's first dean. He said that in establishing the combined program, "we are encouraging greater cooperative efforts and more common enterprises."

Reddick retired as dean of the School of Communications in 1969, as UT required deans to retire at 65. In public remarks that year, Cronkite said that Reddick had "brought the business [of journalism] to a profession" and "created proof that good teachers and good schools of communication can do a good job of producing good journeymen newspapermen." After retiring as dean, he took a leave of absence from UT to serve for a year as the first dean of the University of Tennessee's new college of communications. After the 1969–70 academic year, Reddick returned to UT as a professor of journalism. In 1974, the College of Communication established the DeWitt Carter Reddick Award in his honor, recognizing "excellence in the field of communication." Cronkite was the first recipient, with Lady Bird Johnson in attendance.

He retired that year, but taught one course the following year as professor emeritus and remained active as a consultant, writer, and speaker. On August 22, 1980, Reddick died at his home at the age of 76. After his death, Liz Carpenter said of Reddick that "[w]ith his magical mix of learning and humor, he took us all — so young and green and ignorant — and made us want to be reporters. Everything he touched turned to life, and he touched thousands."

== Sources ==
Books

- Moyers, Bill (2008). Moyers on Democracy. New York: Knopf Doubleday. ISBN 9780385525428.
- Reddick, DeWitt C. (1938). Journalism and the School Paper. Boston: D. C. Heath and Company. OCLC 612411266.
- Reddick, DeWitt C. (1940). The Newspaper as a Recorder of Contemporary History: A Case Study of the Reporting of the French Occupation of the Ruhr in Three American Newspapers (Ph.D.). University of Missouri. OCLC 1235575248.
- Reddick, DeWitt C. (1949). Modern Feature Writing. New York: Harper & Brothers. OCLC 1443647.

Journals

- Reddick, DeWitt C. (March 1975). "It Was Only Fifty Years Ago". The Alcalde. Austin, Texas: The Ex-Students Association, University of Texas.
- "Brief Reviews". College English. 11 (7): 416–421. April 1950. JSTOR 586034.

Newspapers

- "Happy Bridegroom Can't Wait to Tell Secret Marriage". Fort Worth Star-Telegram. August 30, 1908 – via Newspapers.com.
- "Mrs. Fannie Jacks". Fort Worth Record. December 28, 1918 – via Newspapers.com.
- "More Than 5,000 See 195 Graduate from High School". Fort Worth Star-Telegram. June 3, 1921. p. 17 – via Newspapers.com.
- McDonald, R.W. (May 5, 1925). "Longhorn Regains University Favor". Austin American. p. 12 – via Newspapers.com.
- "Floating School Visiting in Japan". Fort Worth Star-Telegram. November 5, 1926. p. 27 – via Newspapers.com.
- "DeWitt Reddick T.U. Journalism Mentor". Fort Worth Record-Telegram. July 20, 1927. p. 11 – via Newspapers.com.
- "Reddick-Bryan to Marry Wednesday". Austin American. June 19, 1934. p. 5 – via Newspapers.com.
- "Couldn't Break Monte Carlo So He Teaches Journalism". Fort Worth Star-Telegram. October 5, 1937. p. 7 – via Newspapers.com.
- "DeWitt Reddick Joins Columbia University Staff". Austin American-Statesman. August 10, 1941. p. 5 – via Newspapers.com.
- "New Dean Emeritus Designated at U. of T." Fort Worth Star-Telegram. February 5, 1956. p. 7 – via Newspapers.com.
- "DeWitt C. Reddick Honored by Council". Austin American. March 9, 1956. p. A13 – via Newspapers.com.
- "Reddick Heads UT Journalism". Austin American-Statesman. June 14, 1959. p. A13 – via Newspapers.com.
- "Communication: UT Launches Challenging Endeavor". Austin American-Statesman. September 26, 1965. p. A12 – via Newspapers.com.
- "Reddick To Take Tennessee Position". Austin American. January 9, 1969. p. 7 – via Newspapers.com.
- "Tennessee News Briefs". Johnson City Press-Chronicle. May 5, 1970. p. 9 – via Newspapers.com.
- O'Connell, John (March 10, 1974). "Cronkite Gives Media Boost". Austin American-Statesman. p. A12 – via Newspapers.com.
- "Services set for Reddick". Austin American-Statesman. August 23, 1980. p. B3 – via Newspapers.com.
- "Renowned UT Prof, DeWitt Reddick, Dies". Fort Worth Star-Telegram. August 23, 1980. p. B3 – via Newspapers.com.

Websites

- "DeWitt Carter Reddick papers, 1925–1986, undated". Texas Archival Resources Online. 2009.
- "DeWitt Carter Reddick Award". The University of Texas at Austin. 2021.
- "History". The University of Texas at Austin. 2021.
- Reddick, Marjorie (1999). "Reddick, DeWitt Carter (1904–1980)". Handbook of Texas. Texas State Historical Association.
- "Texas, U.S., Death Certificates, 1903–1982". Ancestry.com.
