= The Texas Ranger (magazine) =

Undergraduate humor publication of the University of Texas at Austin

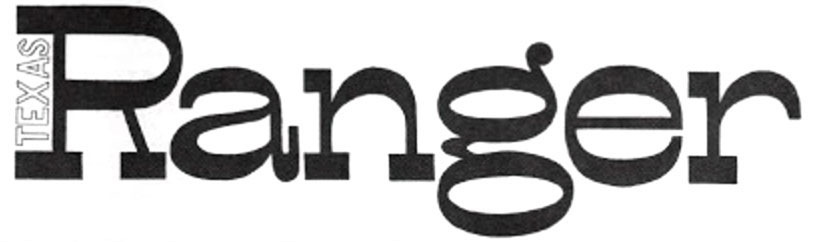
- Editor: Robert C. Eckhardt (1936–1937); Bill Yates (1949–1950); Frank Stack (1958–1959); Bill Helmer (1959–1960); Gilbert Shelton (1962–1963); Robert A. Burns (1966-1967)
- Staff cartoonists: John Canaday, Rowland B. Wilson, Harvey Schmidt, Gilbert Shelton, Frank Stack, Tony Bell, Jaxon,
- Staff writers: Liz Smith, Robert Benton, Joe E. Brown, Jr., Bill Killeen, Lieuen Adkins, Pat Brown
- Categories: Humor magazine
- Frequency: Monthly
- Format: Magazine
- Circulation: 12,000-15,000 (early 1960s)
- Founded: 1923
- First issue: November 1923; 102 years ago
- Final issue: April 1972; 53 years ago
- Company: Texas Student Publications, Inc.
- Based in: University of Texas; Austin, Texas, U.S.
- Language: English

The Texas Ranger was the undergraduate humor publication of the University of Texas at Austin (UT), published from 1923 to 1972. A number of people who later went on to become key members of the underground comix scene — including Frank Stack, Gilbert Shelton, and Jaxon — were Texas Ranger editors and contributors during the period 1959–1965. Other notable contributors to The Texas Ranger over the years included Robert C. Eckhardt, John Canaday, Rowland B. Wilson, Harvey Schmidt, Bill Yates, Liz Smith, Robert Benton, Bill Helmer, Robert A. Burns and Wick Allison.

It was succeeded in 1997 by the Texas Travesty.

== Overview ==
The Texas Ranger was founded in 1923. Seeing itself as a complement to the campus newspaper The Daily Texan, the Ranger focused on humor, cartoons, and images of young women on its covers. Gag cartoons and comic strips were a staple of the magazine from its inception. From early on until late in its run, the magazine featured a female UT student on the cover as the so-called "Girl of the Month" or "GOM." For a number of years (beginning sometime after 1953) The Texas Ranger also ran a Playboy parody in its March issue.

Over the years The Texas Ranger often drew the ire of UT's administration for its targeted satire and occasionally risqué content. Staff members called themselves the "Rangeroos" and were known for their bacchanalian parties, especially in the 1960s during Gilbert Shelton's reign as editor.

The Ranger's offices were in the School of Journalism building. The magazine's affairs were administered first by the Student Association and then by Texas Student Publications, Inc. The magazine published 10 issues annually, skipping July and August. A new editor was elected by the staff every September.

The magazine's mascot, created c. 1950 by Rowland B. Wilson, was a fat, mustachioed outlaw-type called "Hairy Ranger."

== History ==
Antecedents to The Texas Ranger were UT humor publications the Coyote (which was banned by UT's Student Association in 1915) and The Scalper, which published from Oct. 1919 to Nov. 1922 (when it was also banned for its perceived "immorality"). Contributors to The Scalper included Roy Crane and Ralph Jester.

The Texas Ranger was first published in November 1923. One of its earliest contributors was cartoonist John Canaday, who later became a leading art critic, author and art historian.

The Texas Ranger ran afoul of Texas Student Publications in May 1929, when it was banned for a short time, re-emerging in the fall of 1929 — merged with the UT literary magazine, The Longhorn — as University of Texas Longhorn with which is Combined with Texas Ranger. It kept this lengthy title until c. 1931, when it reverted to The Texas Ranger. Future Texas Representative Robert C. Eckhardt was editor in 1936–1937.

The Texas Ranger was again censured by Texas Student Publications in early 1947, and was subsequently profiled in the February 17, 1947, issue of Life magazine related to an article published in the Ranger telling students "how to cheat." This controversy led to more biting work by the Ranger in the half-decade to follow. As a post-war journalism student at UT in 1949–1950, cartoonist Bill Yates edited the magazine. Gag cartoonist Rowland B. Wilson drew cartoons for The Texas Ranger during this same period, a number of which were reprinted by Dell's 1000 Jokes in an ongoing feature, "Varsity Varieties". Liz Smith, Robert Benton, and Harvey Schmidt were staffers for The Texas Ranger during the period 1949-1953.

The Texas Ranger and its sensibility were an especially important expression of American humor and comedy from the late 1950s through the 1960s. A line of demarcation came when cartoonist Frank Stack was The Texas Ranger editor from 1958 to 1959 (he joined the Ranger staff in 1957), during which time he published comic strips by fellow UT student Gilbert Shelton. As editor, Stack aspired for the Ranger to emulate the humor exemplified by The New Yorker and Punch. Although Stack graduated in 1959, starting in 1962, (using the pen-name Foolbert Sturgeon) he published his strip The Adventures of Jesus in The Texas Ranger (as well as early counterculture publications like The Austin Iconoclastic and The Charlatan). During this same period, cartoonist Jack "Jaxon" Jackson was on staff at the Ranger, until he and the others were fired in 1962 over what Jaxon called "a petty censorship violation".

The magazine recovered in 1962–1964, under the editorship of Gilbert Shelton, his girlfriend Pat Brown, and Shelton collaborator Lieuen Adkins. (Shelton had graduated in 1961, but returned to Austin for graduate school – and to avoid the draft.) Shelton's superhero parody Wonder Wart-Hog began appearing in the magazine in 1962. Singer Janis Joplin, at that point a freshman art student at UT, hooked up with the Rangeroos and was even listed on the masthead of a few issues of the Ranger, although she never contributed to any articles. Other staff members during this period were cartoonist Tony Bell and Joe E. Brown, Jr., both of whom later collaborated with Shelton on Wonder Wart-Hog stories.

Subsequent to their involvement with the Ranger, both Stack and Jaxon published collections which were important first works in the history of underground comix, with Stack's 1962 Adventures of Jesus and Jaxon's 1964 God Nose. And by 1968–1969, with Feds 'N' Heads, The Fabulous Furry Freak Brothers, and the formation of Rip Off Press, Shelton had become an important figure in underground comix.

The mid-to-late 1960s brought more student engagement with, and protests about, the Vietnam War; appetite for a humor magazine waned. The magazine responded by becoming more topical, but circulation fell. Robert A. Burns, editor twice during the late 1960s, went on to become art director of the cult horror film The Texas Chain Saw Massacre.

Due to poor sales, The Ranger was closed down (alongside two other UT campus publications) by TSP in Jan. 1972; it published its final issue in April of that year.

The Texas Ranger was briefly revived in 1977 but only lasted a couple of issues.

The University of Texas' current humor publication is the Texas Travesty, established in 1997.

== Texas Ranger editors ==
- 1924 Julian Brazelton
- 1933 Morris Glass
- 1936–1937 Robert C. Eckhardt — later became a Democratic United States Representative for Texas
- 1938–1939 Alice Mary Adams — first female editor
- 1940 Joe James
- 1940–1941 Johnnie Latham
- 1941–1942 W. l. (Whiskey) Harper
- 1941 Jack Adkins
- 1943 Jack Adkins
- 1946–1947 John Bryson
- 1947 Ben Jeffery
- 1947–1948 Robert Johnson
- 1948–1949 Floyd Wade
- 1949–1950 Bill Yates — gag cartoonist who later became the comic strip editor for King Features Syndicate
- 1950–1951 Bill Bridges
- 1954 Jim Wright
- 1955 James Hall
- 1956 Lee Ricks — resigned due to academic and personal pressures
- 1956 Bill West — flunked out; had to resign as editor
- 1956–1957 Jon Bracker
- 1957–1958 Rudy Rochelle
- 1958–1959 Frank Stack — became an important underground cartoonist and fine artist
- 1959–1960 Bill Helmer — brought back as "Supervisor" in 1965–1966; moved on to become a senior editor at Playboy
- 1960–1961 Lynn Ashby — resigned in protest over a censorship incident; later became a humor columnist for the Houston Post
- 1961 Hugh Lowe
- 1961 Jack Lowe
- 1962 David Lopez
- 1962 Ray Hanson
- 1962–1963 Gilbert Shelton — became an important figure in underground comix
- 1963–1964 Lieuen Adkins — staff member since 1959; later a key contributor to Gilbert Shelton's Feds 'N' Heads
- 1964 Pat Brown — second female editor
- 1964–1965 Mary Weatherspoon
- 1965 Clint Dare
- 1966 Byron Black
- 1966 Gary Bullock
- 1966–1967 Robert A. Burns
- 1967 Gary Bullock — second stint as editor
- 1967 Brooks Peterson
- 1967–1968 Robert A. Burns — second stint as editor
- 1968–1969 John Stalmach
- 1969 John Huke
- 1969–1970 Wick Allison — later became the owner and publisher of D Magazine and the principal owner of People Newspapers
- 1971-1972 Jack Stockton
- 1977 Colin Hunter
