= 1000 Jokes =

- Former editors: Bill Yates
- Categories: Humor
- Frequency: Quarterly
- Founded: 1937
- Company: Dell Magazines
- Country: United States
- Language: English

1000 Jokes was a humor magazine launched by Dell Publishing in 1937. With a later title change to 1000 Jokes Magazine, it was published quarterly over three decades. During the 1950s, it was edited by Bill Yates with associate editor John Norment.

The format featured brief humorous essays, short satires, cartoons and light verse. Pantomime cartoons were grouped into a section titled "Too Funny for Words". "Louder and Funnier" featured one-liners, such as, "Then there is the rich Texan who has a different dentist for every tooth."

== Cartoonists ==
Covers during the 1940s and 1950s featured caricatures of comedians by Rowland B. Wilson and others. This eventually made a transition to photo covers. Cartoonists included Bob Barnes, Irwin Caplan, Chon Day, Leo Garel, Jerry Marcus, Don Orehek, Virgil Partch, Bob Schroeter, Eli Stein, George Wolfe and Pete Wyma. The magazine paid $15 for a cartoon and an equal amount for an 18-line verse. Many of the cartoons were later recycled into paperback cartoon collections. Cartoonist Lee Lorenz described cartoonists making rounds and making a sale to 1000 Jokes:

After The New Yorker stop, they moved on: Collier's, The Saturday Evening Post, Esquire, Sports Illustrated, Ladies' Home Journal, American Legion, True, Cavalier, Playboy. "At the end of the day," Mr. Lorenz said, "you'd go to 1000 Jokes, published by Dell, and the editor would sop up whatever was left."

A sister Dell publication was For Laughing Out Loud, and Dell revived the Ballyhoo title in the early 1950s. Both employed the 1000 Jokes format of mixing cartoons with short humorous essays.

== See also ==
- Charley Jones Laugh Book
- Humorama
