= Los Angeles Center (University of Texas at Austin) =

American academic campus in California

Coordinates: 34.1783°N 118.3075°W

University of Texas Los Angeles Center (commonly known as the UTLA Center or UTLA Program) is an academic campus of the University of Texas at Austin located in the Burbank area of Los Angeles, California. The UTLA Center is home to the Semester in Los Angeles study abroad program sponsored by the University of Texas at Austin Moody College of Communication. The center was the first permanent campus for the University of Texas outside the state and is one of a handful of such entertainment-focused programs with a base in Los Angeles offered by any university outside the area.

== History ==
The Semester in Los Angeles Program was founded in 2005 with a $500,000 donation from the Cain Foundation, an Austin based non profit. The program officially opened in the summer of 2005 and has seen increased enrollment in each subsequent semester. The program currently runs three times per year in fall, spring and summer semesters.

In 2008, the program opened select spots to student from 20 other schools around the state including other members of the University of Texas System, Rice University, Southern Methodist University, Texas Christian University, as well as international students. The program will change from a first come first served basis, to a merit based system starting in the spring of 2011 due to increased demand. Students will be selected based on GPA standings and an essay of intent for what they hope to gain from the program.

In 2017, following another donation from the Cain Foundation, the UTLA program moved to a new facility in downtown Burbank called the Wofford Denius UTLA Center for Entertainment & Media Studies. The Semester in Los Angeles Program is now open only to University of Texas at Austin students.

In 2020, Mira Lippold-Johnson was named the new Director of the Wofford Denius UTLA Center for Entertainment & Media Studies. She currently oversees the Semester in Los Angeles Program.

== Semester in Los Angeles Program ==
The Semester in Los Angeles Program is a pre-professional program for University of Texas students interested in pursuing careers in the entertainment industry. Students in the program get practical experience through internships in the entertainment industry in businesses such as production companies, talent agencies, record labels, and marketing and advertising firms. They also take classes at the UTLA Center that are taught by industry professionals.

After students are admitted to the program, they get the support of the UTLA staff in preparing their internship application materials and applying for internships.

UTLA encourages students to participate in the program during the last semester of their senior year if they feel confident they want to pursue a career in entertainment in Los Angeles after graduation, or conversely before they intend to graduate if they would like a supportive environment to test if Los Angeles is a good fit for them.
