= Bill Yates =

American cartoonist

- Born: July 5, 1921 Samson, Alabama, U.S.
- Died: March 26, 2001 (aged 79) Norwalk, Connecticut, U.S.
- Areas: Cartoonist, Editor
- Notable works: comic strip editor for King Features Syndicate (1978–1988); Professor Phumble; the small society; Redeye
- Spouse: Jessie Jean ("Skippy") Hardy

Floyd Buford Yates (July 5, 1921 – March 26, 2001), better known as Bill Yates, was an American cartoonist who drew gag cartoons and comic strips before assuming the position of comic strip editor for King Features Syndicate in 1978.

== Biography ==
Born in Samson, Alabama, Yates learned to cartoon by taking the W. L. Evans Correspondence Course; his first sale was a five-dollar first prize in The Open Road for Boys cartoon contest. He served as an aviator in the United States Navy during World War II training fighter pilots in Corpus Christi, Texas, where he married Jessie Jean ("Skippy") Hardy. As a journalism student at the University of Texas, he edited the campus humor magazine, The Texas Ranger.

== Career ==
After moving to New York in 1950, Yates edited Dell Publishing's cartoon magazines (1000 Jokes, Ballyhoo, For Laughing Out Loud) and Dell's paperback cartoon collections, such as Forever Funny (1956). His comic strip about an absent-minded professor, Professor Phumble, was carried by King Features from 1960 to 1978. In Brazil during the early 1960s, Professor Phumble was published as Zé Fiasco in the Correio da Manhã newspaper and as Professor Tantã in the Folha de S.Paulo newspaper, with the latter being the strip's more famous Brazilian nickname.

In addition to work on Jimmy Hatlo's Little Iodine, Yates also did the strip Benjy with Jim Berry from 1973 to 1975. In addition to work in advertising and twice-weekly editorial cartoons for the Westport News in Connecticut, Yates also illustrated books and comic books, such as Charlton's Ronald McDonald (1970–71).

When Sylvan Byck retired from King Features Syndicate in 1978, Yates took over the position of comics editor. In 1986, he began collaborating with Morrie Brickman on the political strip, the small society (written lower-case as a satiric nod toward Lyndon Johnson's "Great Society"). The strip carried the signatures of both Brickman and Yates until 1989, after which point it became a solo effort by Yates. When Gordon Bess, the writer of Redeye (with art by Mel Casson) became ill in May 1988, Yates took over the scripting of that strip as well.

At the end of 1988, Yates left his editorial position at King Features in order to focus on cartooning full-time. He continued to write Redeye and do both scripting and art on the small society, but increasing ill health forced his retirement from the strips in 1999. Casson continued to write and draw Redeye for King Features.

== Personal life and death ==
Yates lived in Westport, Connecticut for 50 years. In 2001, three months after the death of his wife, he died in Norwalk, Connecticut of complications from pneumonia and Alzheimer's. He was survived by his daughter, Georgia Y. Rojas of Trumbull, Connecticut; his sister, Ralphine Lee of Powder Springs, Georgia; and two grandchildren, Matthew Rojas and Emma Rojas.
