= STAPLE! =

Annual convention in Texas, United States

- Status: Active
- Genre: Alternative comics
- Venue: various venues in Austin
- Locations: Austin, Texas
- Country: United States
- Inaugurated: 2005
- Founders: Chris Nicholas
- Organizer: Chris Nicholas/Austin Books
- Website: www.staple-austin.org

STAPLE! The Independent Media Expo is an annual convention in Austin, Texas, United States, for alternative comics, minicomics, webcomics, zines, underground comics, and graphic arts. Chris Nicholas founded the conference as a gathering place for professional artists and amateur creators, "a showcase for the folks who publish comics and zines and possible literary masterworks out of their own apartments."

The show is sponsored by Austin Books, an Eisner-nominated comic book store and the site of the largest gathering of artists for the worldwide 24-Hour Comics Day held in 2005.

Additional sponsors include Rogues Gallery: Comics + Games, ECPrinting.com, Dragon's Lair: Comics & Fantasy, KOOP (FM), Motorblade Postering Services, CKP communication agency of record, and Bumperactive.com.

== History ==
The 2020 show, scheduled for October, was cancelled due to the COVID-19 pandemic. The show returned in 2024.

== Event dates and locations ==
- March 5, 2005: BPOE #201
- March 4, 2006: Red Oak Ballroom
- March 3, 2007: Red Oak Ballroom
- March 1, 2008: Monarch Event Center
- March 7, 2009: Monarch Event Center
- March 6, 2010: Monarch Event Center
- March 5–6, 2011: Marchesa Hall and Theatre
- March 3–4, 2012: Marchesa Hall and Theater
- March 2–3, 2013: Marchesa Hall and Theater
- March 1–2, 2014: Marchesa Hall and Theater
- March 7–8, 2015: Marchesa Hall and Theater
- March 5–6, 2016: Marchesa Hall and Theater
- September 9–10, 2017: Millennium Youth Entertainment Complex
- September 8–9, 2018: Millennium Youth Entertainment Complex
- October 12–13, 2019: Millennium Youth Entertainment Complex
- ~~October 2020~~: Cancelled due to COVID-19 pandemic
- April 13-14, 2024: Mabee Ballroom, St. Edward's University
- April 12-13, 2025: Mabee Ballroom, St. Edward's University
- April 11-12, 2026: Mabee Ballroom, St. Edward's University

== See also ==
- Alternative Press Expo
- MoCCA Festival
- Small Press Expo
