= Department of Radio–Television–Film (University of Texas at Austin) =

Coordinates: 30.289125°N 97.740775°W

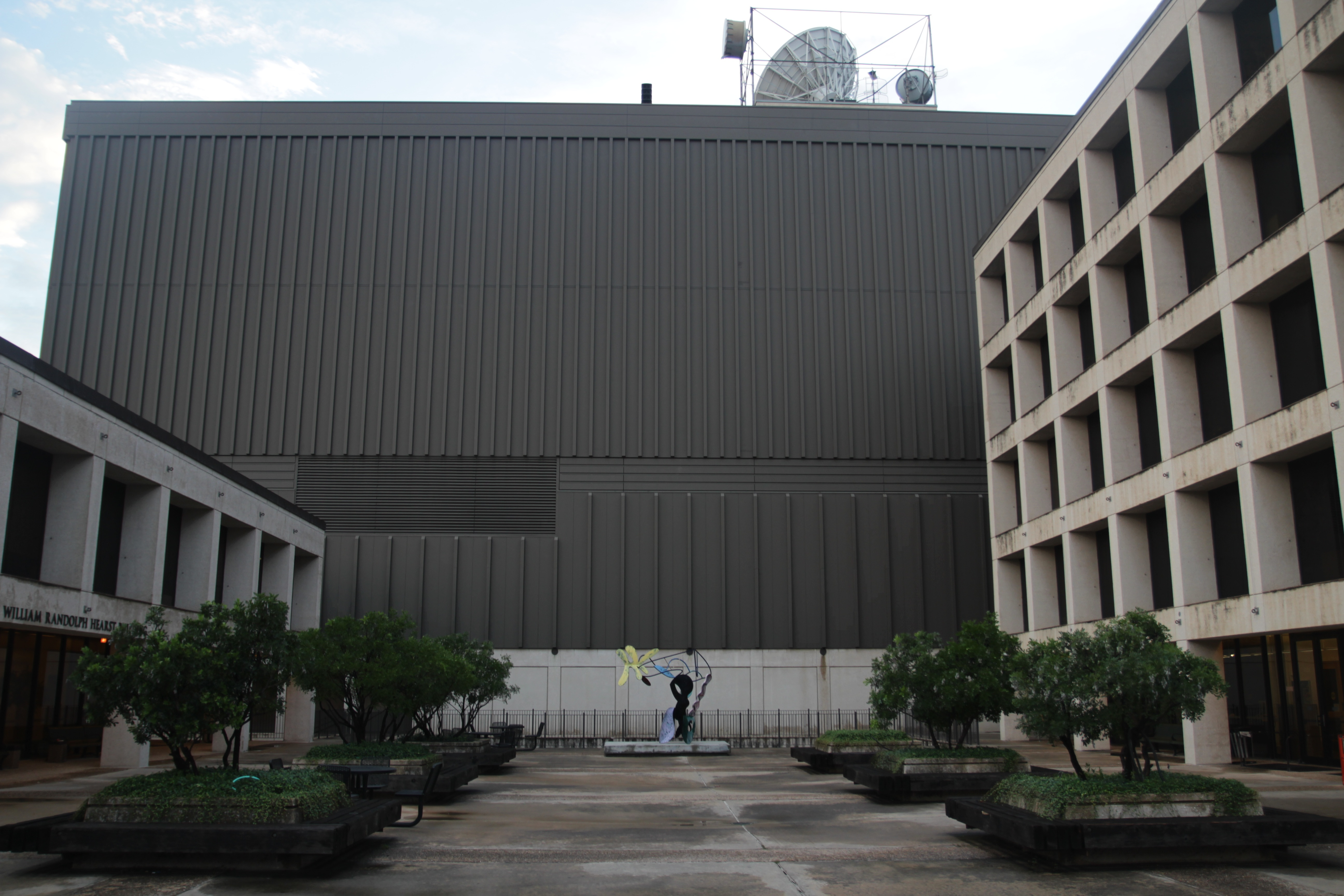
- Established: 1965
- Chairperson: Cindy McCreery
- Faculty: 53
- Undergraduates: 1000+
- Postgraduates: 160
- Location: Austin, Texas, United States
- Website: rtf.utexas.edu

The Department of Radio–Television–Film is one of the five departments comprising the Moody College of Communication at the University of Texas at Austin, located in Austin, Texas. The department was founded in 1965.

== History ==
The pre-history of the film school dates back to 1921, when the University of Texas launched the first experimental radio broadcast in the state of Texas, offering its first degree program in broadcasting in 1939. By the 1960s, the university planned to consolidate all of its communication studies under one roof and in 1965 founded the Moody College of Communication with three departments including Journalism, Public Relations, a newly formed department of Radio–Television–Film. In 1968, the school began construction its new three building home in the northwest corner of the campus, which was completed in 1974.

In 2007, the Belo Foundation announced a $15 million donation to build a new communication's facility north of the existing complex, with the official groundbreaking taking place in May 2010. The Texas Student Media building has officially renamed the William Randolph Hearst Building, after a significant donation from the Hearst Corporation. The FCC licensed student television station K29HW-D received an $80,000 digital transmitter retrofit to comply with the mandated digital television transition in 2009.

== Facilities ==
Opened in 1974, the CMB building holds most of the school's production classes, while the CMA building provides classrooms for most of the school's media studies courses shared with other communications departments. The 8 story CMB Building was formerly the headquarters of Austin City Limits with their 500-seat ACL studio, as well as Austin's PBS station KLRU.

The building features 5 professional 1,200-square-foot (110 m^{2}) sound stages with variety of Mole-Richardson lights that can be moved around and connected to the studio lighting grid, and a master light board for dimming. There are also a variety of Mac editing labs with both Avid and Final Cut Pro, as well as Pro Tools and ADR Studios.

Enrolled students can check out a variety of equipment including Sony ex-1 and Panasonic HVX digital cameras, bolex and arri 16 mm cameras, production sound equipment, gaffing equipment including HMI and Mole lights, flags, C stands, generators, and dimmers. Graduate students have preferred access to all equipment in addition to exclusive access to Arri Alexa and 35 millimeter Arri film cameras.

== Curriculum ==
=== Undergraduate ===
The department offers a single degree to undergraduates: the four-year, full-time Bachelor of Science. Generally, the first two years are spent fulfilling the university core requirements while completing the necessary lower-division courses starting with RTF 305, a class introducing the fundamentals of Media Studies, followed by RTF 317, a narrative strategies class focusing on structure in film and television, and RTF 318, formerly known as Film 1, the first film production class consisting of three projects: a still photo project, a still photo project with audio, and a final short film project.

Once the three classes initial have been taken along with at least two additional lower division courses, commonly film history class, and a film course with a cultural diversity component, students progress into upper division studies where they can specialize in a variety of tracks. The department offers robust media studies curriculums as well as a variety of film production tracks.

- Editing – The department offers a three tiered editing track, beginning with introduction to editing which lectures on the theories behind editing as well as re-editing existing news, documentary, and narrative footage, usually from former graduate level projects. All three levels use primarily Avid. Intermediate and advanced editing courses are offered after the completion of the introductory course and expound upon editing theory and practical software skills.
- Digital Animation – The digital animation track consists of an introductory and advanced animation course, as well as a specialized 3D animation or 2D animation course. The animation courses focus on Adobe After Effects to teach students the interface and how to create digital special effects, often for undergraduate projects.
- Directing – The directing track offers the most robust variety of courses. A three-tier narrative film making track with classes in 16 mm film or digital video is offered, which culminates in an undergraduate thesis course. There are also two levels of documentary courses, and two levels of studio production courses using a three-camera setup.
- Cinematography – There is one dedicated cinematography course offered after completing two levels of directing courses, though in both directing classes, students are divided into groups with a dedicated cinematographer appointed to photograph a short film project.
- Screenwriting – The department offers a two-tier screenwriting track starting with an Introduction to Screenwriting class focusing exclusively on three-act structure for films and common structures for various television genres. Students learn to write coverage by reading notable screenplays and submitting their feedback, and also write the first act of a feature-length screenplay with a road map for the rest of the film, as well as a spec television script from a current television show of their choice. After completing the introductory course, students can specialize in either film or television writing where they either write a completed three-act screenplay or spec episodes of TV shows.
- Sound – The audio track consists of an introductory and advanced audio production and post class along with a radio fundamentals course. Students are required to boom or sound mix on other student projects as part of their final grade.
- Producing – The producing track consists of two classes taught by independent film producer's representative John Pierson or industry veteran Richard Lewis. The introduction to producing class focuses on the fundamentals of producing films where students learn to break down scripts before integrating them into industry-standard EP Budgeting and EP Scheduling. Students also analyze the production, distribution, and marketing of films often produced as a result of the advanced producing class, or from interviews brought in by John Pierson which usually feature Kevin Smith's producer Scott Mosier at least once per semester. The advanced producing class typically selects two films each semester in hopes of promoting the films in the festival circuit. Students devote their spring break to the class to attend the South by Southwest film festival in order to promote their chosen film.

=== Graduate ===
The department's scholarly and teaching interests focus on the cultural, social, economic, political and discursive settings in which communication systems, industries, texts and audiences exist and operate. We examine national and international media institutions, the role, development and impact of communication and information technologies, the production of media content, and the nature and form of media representations. We investigate how various audiences receive, interact with, interpret and produce media texts and have a special focus on studies of culture and the international dimensions of communication processes. The department's faculty addresses these issues from a variety of theoretical and methodological approaches associated with the humanities and social sciences.

The department's Master of Fine Arts programs are designed to help students become filmmakers and writers capable of producing provocative and entertaining work. The programs concentrate on storytelling for film, video, and time-based media. The MFA in production emphasizes directing while grounding students in skills across production craft disciplines.

The RTF Department currently has 28 faculty members who provide an environment in which graduate students receive optimal opportunity for study, research, teaching and the production of creative work. Production area faculty are all active, working filmmakers with experience spanning genres.

- Media Studies – The Department offers two main degree tracks within Media Studies: MA and PhD. A dual degree option is available for students pursuing the MA track.
- Film and Media Production – The MFA in Film & Media Production is a professional training program designed for creative individuals with a demonstrated commitment to filmmaking as a professional, artistic, or academic pursuit.
- Screenwriting – The MFA in screenwriting is a two-year (including one summer), 45-hour degree designed for creative individuals with a demonstrated commitment to storytelling for the screen.

== Alumni ==
Alumni of the Radio–Television–Film program include Athena Rachel Tsangari, David Blue Garcia, Bryan Bertino, Mark Duplass, Jay Duplass, Glen Powell, Robert Rodriguez, Tobe Hooper, Michael Zinberg, Matthew McConaughey, Thomas Schlamme, Lev L. Spiro, Daniel Pearl, Bruce Hendricks, Rob Walker, Beau Thorne, Maggie Carey, Patrick Sean Smith, Heather Courtney, Peggy Chiao, Todd Berger, Noel Wells, Geoff Marslett, the creators of Hemlock Grove, Andrew Dismukes, Matt Hullum and many members of Rooster Teeth Productions.
