= Texas Travesty =

University of Texas at Austin student newspaper

Coordinates: 30°16′48.1″N 97°44′24″W

The Texas Travesty
- Categories: Humor newspaper
- Frequency: 6x/year
- Format: Newspaper
- Founder: Kevin Butler and Brad Butler
- First issue: 1997; 28 years ago
- Company: Texas Student Media
- Based in: University of Texas; Austin, Texas, U.S.
- Language: English
- Website: http://www.texastravesty.com

The Texas Travesty is a student-produced satirical newspaper created and produced at the University of Texas at Austin.

The Travesty began in 1997 as an independent, online-only publication by the Butler brothers: Kevin Butler (a former editorial columnist for The Daily Texan) and Brad Butler. Within a year, the publication successfully appealed for inclusion within Texas Student Media (TSM, officially named Texas Student Publications), an auxiliary enterprise of the university which publishes The Daily Texan and produces KVRX and TSTV.

The staff produces six issues each school year, three each long semester. According to the TSM itself, the Travesty currently has a print distribution of roughly 25,000 copies, in addition to thousands of online readers. The Travesty is supported by advertising revenue. As a publication within TSM, the paper shares some revenue and expenses with the general TSM organization. The editor-in-chief holds a non-voting position on the TSM board of directors.

Several of the Travesty's writers and editors went on to publish That Other Paper, a once-popular but now-defunct alternative weekly in Austin, Texas.

== Awards ==
Austin Chronicle — Best of Austin

- 2014: Best Local Publication (Readers' Poll)
- 2010: Best Local Publication (Readers' Poll)
- 2009: Best Local Publication (Readers' Poll)
- 2006: Best Local Publication (Readers' Poll)
- 2005: Best Local Publication (Readers' Poll)
- 2004: Best Local Publication (Readers' Poll)
- 2003: Best Parody Newspaper (Critics' Choice)

== See also ==
- The Texas Ranger
