= Sylvan Byck =

American editor and cartoonist

- Born: July 17, 1904; Otisville, New York, U.S.
- Died: July 8, 1982 (aged 77); Queens, New York, U.S.
- Education: Pratt Institute
- Occupations: Editor; Editorial cartoonist; Newspaper executive
- Years active: 1937–1978
- Employer: King Features Syndicate
- Title: Vice president of King Features Syndicate
- Successor: Bill Yates
- Awards: Silver T-Square Award

Signature
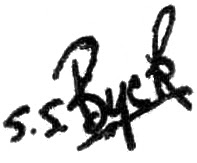

Sylvan S. Byck (/ˈbaɪk/; July 17, 1904 – July 8, 1982) was an American editor and cartoonist, who was the comic strip editor for King Features Syndicate for over 30 years, in which position he evaluated "up to 2000 comics submissions a year."

== Early life ==
Sylvan Byck was born July 17, 1904, in Otisville, New York. After graduating from the Pratt Institute, Byck worked for various newspapers, including as an editorial cartoonist at the Brooklyn Times-Union and The Seattle Times.

== Career ==
In 1937, Byck joined King Features Syndicate, where he edited Pictorial Review; during the Second World War, he served as "cable editor" for International News Service. In 1945, he became King's comics editor.

Among the multiple projects that he purchased were Mort Walker's Beetle Bailey (which he saved from cancellation by relaying to Walker the suggestion that the strip's college-student protagonist should join the United States Army) and Hi and Lois, for which Byck and Walker independently suggested recruiting Dik Browne as illustrator (Browne later recalled that, when first contacted by Byck, he assumed that it was Stan Drake playing a prank). As well, Byck suggested that Bob Weber produce a strip of his own; Weber subsequently created Moose Miller. Other strips in whose launching he was "instrumental" included Buz Sawyer, Redeye, Hazel, Trudy, The Lockhorns, Inside Woody Allen, and the Archie comic strip. As well, he "wrote the continuity story lines" for a variety of comic strips, including Secret Agent X-9 and Jungle Jim.

Byck was also responsible for ensuring the continuation of strips after their original creators were no longer available, including Little Iodine (where he arranged for Hy Eisman to succeed Bob Dunn — who was himself a successor to Jimmy Hatlo) and Rip Kirby (where he tried to recruit Leonard Starr to succeed Alex Raymond in the wake of Raymond's sudden death; Starr suggested that Byck instead hire John Prentice). However, in the case of Steve Canyon, Byck "dismissed the possibility of a successor" to the strip's creator Milt Caniff, on the grounds that Caniff "could never be imitated".

Byck was elected a vice president of King Features in 1964, and retired in 1978, succeeded by Bill Yates (who Byck had recruited in 1960 as the creator of Professor Phumble). Byck died at the age of 78 in Queens, New York, on July 8, 1982.

== Praise ==
In 1977, Inklings Magazine (journal of the Museum of Cartoon Art) called Byck "the most influential man in newspaper comics in our generation", and in 1979, the National Cartoonists Society awarded him the Silver T-Square Award.

Mort Walker said that, of all the editors he met when he was beginning his career, Byck was "the most helpful and encouraging".

== Criticism ==
Alex Toth stated that, when he applied to be the new illustrator for the Perry Mason comic strip, Byck told him that he would be required to imitate Alex Raymond's style rather than use his own; Toth refused, and subsequently noted that if Raymond had "witnessed the absurd lengths to which (Byck went) in imposing (Raymond's) style on other talents, he would be Byck's most vociferous detractor".

Stan Drake reported having been chastised by Byck for including too much emotional expression when drawing the faces of characters in The Heart of Juliet Jones.
