= Byck =

Byck is a surname. Notable people with the surname include:

- Muriel Byck (1918–1944), female Special Operations Executive agent during World War II
- Samuel Byck (1930–1974), who attempted to assassinate U.S. President Richard Nixon
- Sylvan Byck (1904–1982), American editor and cartoonist
