= Mel Casson =

American cartoonist (1920–2008)

Alfred James (pseudonym for Alfred Andriola) and Mel Casson's It's Me, Dilly (October 27, 1957)

Mel Casson (July 25, 1920 – May 21, 2008) was an American cartoonist with a 50-year career. He is primarily remembered for his work on the daily comic strips Sparky, Angel, Mixed Singles/Boomer and Redeye, plus numerous magazine cartoons.

== Early life and education ==
Born in Boston, Massachusetts, Casson was encouraged by his father to pursue a career in art. He received a scholarship to the Art Students League of New York. Casson signed a cartooning contract with The Saturday Evening Post at age 17, and his artwork began to appear regularly in The Saturday Evening Post, Esquire, The New York Times, Ladies' Home Journal and other major magazines.

He enlisted in the infantry for World War II service and made the Normandy Landing on D-Day. His commander was killed instantly upon reaching Omaha Beach, leaving Casson to lead the attack. He successfully led his men through the assault without further casualties and went on to participate in other battles, earning the rank of captain and decorated with five battle stars: two Bronze Stars, the Croix de Guerre and two Purple Hearts.

== Comic strips ==
After World War II, he returned to cartooning, drawing the comic strip Jeff Crockett from March 8, 1948 to March 5th, 1949 for the New York Herald Tribune Syndicate. He was recalled to active military duty in 1952 for service in the Korean War. After a 1953 honorable discharge, he was back at the drawing board for the Publisher/Chicago Sun-Times Syndicate (1953–66) with the children's strips Sparky and Angel.

He co-created It's Me, Dilly with Alfred James (pseudonym for Alfred Andriola of Kerry Drake) and worked on the strip from 1958 to 1962. In the 1970s, Casson collaborated with William F. Brown on the comic strip Mixed Singles, later renamed Boomer. It was marketed by United Feature Syndicate until 1981. In 1988, when cartoonist Gordon Bess found himself unable to continue his internationally known Redeye daily comic for King Features Syndicate, he handed it over to a collaboration of Casson as illustrator and Bill Yates as writer. When Yates himself became ill in 1999, Casson took over both writing and art for the strip, a role he continued until his death in 2008.

Casson was married to Mary Lee Culver Casson, an opera singer and actress, from 1965 to his death. He had one daughter, Culver as well as a brother, Stanley Casson who lived in Brooklyn. He lived in Westport, Connecticut nearly all of his married life.

== Books ==
Casson had five cartoon books published, including the anthology Ever Since Adam and Eve for McGraw-Hill, the Whole Kids Catalogue and the Guinness Record Keeper. He did occasional television work, notably writing and producing the shows Draw Me a Laugh and You Be the Judge.

== Exhibitions ==
Casson's work was twice exhibited at the Metropolitan Museum of Art in New York City. His drawings are in the collection of the Evansville, Indiana, Fine Arts Museum and the Albert T. Reid collection (University of Kansas). His personal papers and original drawings are in the collection of the Billy Ireland Cartoon Library & Museum.

== Awards ==
Casson served on the Board of Governors of the Newspaper Comics Council, where he was chairman of the 1964-65 World's Fair Committee. He was also on the board of the National Cartoonists Society, whose Connecticut chapter honored him with its Legend Award in November 2003.
