= Mongrel (1982 film) =

- Directed by: Robert A. Burns
- Written by: Robert A. Burns
- Starring: Janis Dickerson; John Dodson; Terry Evans; Mitch Pileggi; Aldo Ray
- Music by: Ed Guinn
- Release date: August 23, 1982
- Running time: 88 minutes
- Country: United States
- Language: English

Mongrel is a 1982 American horror film written and directed by Robert A. Burns. This is the only feature film Burns directed.
