= Peter R. Kann =

American journalist, editor, and businessman

- Born: 1942 (age 83–84); Princeton, New Jersey, U.S.
- Education: Harvard University
- Occupation: Journalist
- Spouse: Karen Elliott House

Peter R. Kann (born 1942) is an American journalist, editor, and businessman.

== Early life and education ==
Kann was born to a Jewish family in Princeton, New Jersey. He graduated from Harvard University with a bachelor's degree in journalism.

== Career ==
In 1963, he joined the San Francisco bureau of The Wall Street Journal. In 1964, he was promoted to staff reporter working in both the Pittsburgh and Los Angeles news bureaus. In 1967, Kann became the Wall Street Journal's first resident reporter in Vietnam and from 1969 to 1975, he was based in Hong Kong covering the Vietnam War and other events in Asia. In 1972, he earned a Pulitzer Prize for his coverage of the Indo-Pakistan War in Bangladesh. In 1976 he became the first editor and publisher of The Wall Street Journal Asia. He returned to the United States in 1976. He was named publisher of The Wall Street Journal in 1988. From 1992 until 2006 he was CEO and chairman of the board of Dow Jones & Company.

He is a Trustee of the Institute for Advanced Study, Trustee Emeritus of the Asia Society, and adjunct faculty at the Columbia University Graduate School of Journalism. He is a longtime member of the Council on Foreign Relations.

== Personal life ==
He is married to Karen Elliott House.
