= Joe M. O'Connell =

American novelist

- Education: Texas State University (MFA)
- Occupations: Novelist; documentary filmmaker; short story writer; photographer; journalist
- Writing career
- Genre: Literary fiction

Joe M. O'Connell is an American novelist, documentary filmmaker, short story writer, photographer and journalist based in Austin, Texas.

His 2018 documentary film Danger God examines the life of B-movie stuntman Gary Kent. His second documentary Rondo and Bob was released in 2020 and won multiple awards on the film festival circuit. The film is about Robert A. Burns, the art director for The Texas Chain Saw Massacre, and his obsession with actor Rondo Hatton. Rondo and Bob was released in 2024 on DVD in Germany as Two Faces of Horror.

Considered an expert on the Texas film scene, O'Connell wrote columns about the Texas film industry that appeared in the Austin American-Statesman from 2000 to 2004 (titled "On Location"), in the Dallas Morning News from 2005 to 2011 (as "Shot in Texas") and in The Austin Chronicle from 2004 to 2009 (as "Film News.") His film articles were also published regularly in the San Antonio Express-News and nationally in Variety. He has also contributed to Texas Monthly.

His first novel, Evacuation Plan, centered in a residential hospice was published in 2007 by Dalton Publishing, won the North Texas Book Festival Award in fiction, and was a finalist for the Violet Crown Book Award given by the Writers' League of Texas. O'Connell's short stories have taken first prize at both the Deep South Writers Conference and the Louzelle Rose Barclay Awards, and have been published in literary journals including The G.W. Review, Confrontation, Lullwater Review and Other Voices.

Born in Austin, Texas, to noted architect William R. O'Connell and nurse Wylma Castleberry O'Connell Ruelke, Joe was raised mainly in Austin, but lived briefly in Northglenn, Colorado, and India. He then went to Southwest Texas State University and received a degree in journalism in 1984. O'Connell worked as a newspaper reporter/editor in various cities around Texas, concentrating on covering government and politics. He later returned to SWT (now known as Texas State University) to earn an MFA in creative writing in 1995 while working long distance with the late, famed short-story writer Andre Dubus.

O'Connell taught writing at St. Edward's University and currently teaches at Austin Community College. He lives outside Austin, Texas.
