= Staley T. McBrayer =

- Born: June 22, 1909; Saltillo, Texas
- Died: April 14, 2002 (aged 92); Fort Worth, Texas
- Occupations: Newspaper publisher and inventor
- Known for: Inventing the Vanguard web offset press for newspaper printing

Staley Thomas McBrayer (June 22, 1909 – April 14, 2002) was a newspaper publisher and inventor best known for inventing the Vanguard web offset press for newspaper printing. A native of Saltillo, Texas, he earned degrees from East Texas State Teachers College (now East Texas A&M University) and the University of Texas at Austin (UT Austin). He owned numerous newspapers in Fort Worth, other cities in the Dallas–Fort Worth metroplex, and Greater Houston. After five years of effort and experimentation, he ultimately succeeded in modifying an offset printing press designed for book printing and adapting it for printing newspapers: the resulting Vanguard web offset press, which he unveiled in 1954, reduced the cost, time, and manual labor required to print newspapers, which was especially beneficial to small newspapers. Due to his invention, he is sometimes referred to as the "Orville Wright" or "Wilbur Wright" of offset newspaper publishing.

== Early life and career ==
Staley Thomas McBrayer was born on June 22, 1909, and raised in Saltillo, Texas. He attended East Texas State Teachers College (now East Texas A&M University), graduating with a bachelor's degree in 1933. While a student, he worked in the business department of The Commerce Journal as well as on The East Texan. In 1936, he earned a graduate degree from the University of Texas at Austin (UT Austin), where he majored in journalism.

After graduating, McBrayer worked as the advertising and business manager of The Commerce Journal. By the early 1940s, he and his wife Beverly owned four weekly newspapers in Fort Worth, Texas. By the end of the decade, they also owned daily newspapers in adjacent Dallas–Fort Worth metroplex cities of Arlington, Grand Prairie, Haltom City, Irving, and Richland Hills. McBrayer also published The Pasadena Citizen in Pasadena, Texas, and established The News-Citizen in Clear Lake in June 1961.

== Vanguard web offset press ==
McBrayer is best known for inventing the Vanguard web offset press for newspaper printing. After five years of effort and experimentation, he ultimately succeeded in modifying an offset printing press designed for book printing and adapting it for printing newspapers: the result was the Vanguard web offset press, which he unveiled in 1954 in Fort Worth. McBrayer began by acquiring a German-built offset press for $10,000, which he modified for newspaper printing by experimenting with a variety of inks, metals, papers, and plastics. McBrayer's design was physically made and refined by J. Grant Ghormley Jr., an engineer from Fort Worth, and draftsman Clyde T. "Jack" Kitchens; Ghormley and Kitchens were awarded the key patents for the Vanguard web offset press.

The Vanguard web offset press shifted the newspaper printing business from "hot type" printing that relied on hand-setting metal type to "cold type" printing that used photographic images instead, which reduced both the cost and time required to print newspapers. The invention also allowed small community newspapers to share printing sites and reduced the amount of manual labor required to print a newspaper, leading to increased labor tensions with linotypists.

Texas A&M University–Commerce professor Otha Spencer credited McBrayer with pioneering the publication of suburban newspapers, as well as saving small newspapers from extinction. American Newspaper Publishers Association (ANPA) vice president William Rinehart even credited McBrayer with saving newspapers themselves in 1989, when he stated that, without the web offset press, "There absolutely wouldn't be newspapers, as we know them, today. It's that simple." McBrayer himself stated that concern for reducing costs, and not altruism, was what chiefly motivated his invention. According to Spencer, by the mid-1980s, less than three decades after McBrayer's invention, "99 percent of the country's newspapers were offset". The newspaper industry writ large was slow to adopt the web offset press, however: by the 1960s, Goss International began to use the technology, while Harris Corporation adopted it later.

== Honors and legacy ==
McBrayer was elected to the national presidency of Sigma Delta Chi, a professional fraternity for journalists later known as the Society of Professional Journalists, in 1967–68. He also served as chairman of the ANPA's offset printing committee. Due to his invention, he is sometimes referred to as the "Orville Wright" or "Wilbur Wright" of offset newspaper publishing.

A&M–Commerce recognized him as a Distinguished Alumnus in 1973; its campus also features the Staley T. McBrayer Instructional Printing Facility, the largest of its kind in Southwestern United States. Similarly, McBrayer was named an Outstanding Alumnus of UT Austin's College of Communication in 1984, the first alumnus to be so honored.

He was also honored as one of 50 people who impacted journalism in the 20th century by Editor & Publisher magazine. In 1992, he received just the fourth ANPA Award since it was established in 1965. He was inducted into the Texas Intercollegiate Press Association Hall of Fame in 2006 and was one of the four-member inaugural class of the Texas Newspaper Hall of Fame in 2007.

In 1977, the McBrayers established a journalism scholarship fund at East Texas State University (now A&M–Commerce). In 1987, McBrayer similarly established an endowed fund in community journalism for UT Austin's College of Communication in honor of his wife Beverly, a 1930 graduate of UT Austin.

== Personal life ==
McBrayer married Beverly Wills in 1938; they met while studying at UT Austin together. Beverly died in December 1997. McBrayer died on April 14, 2002, in Fort Worth, at age 92.
