= Robert A. Burns =

American art director and production designer

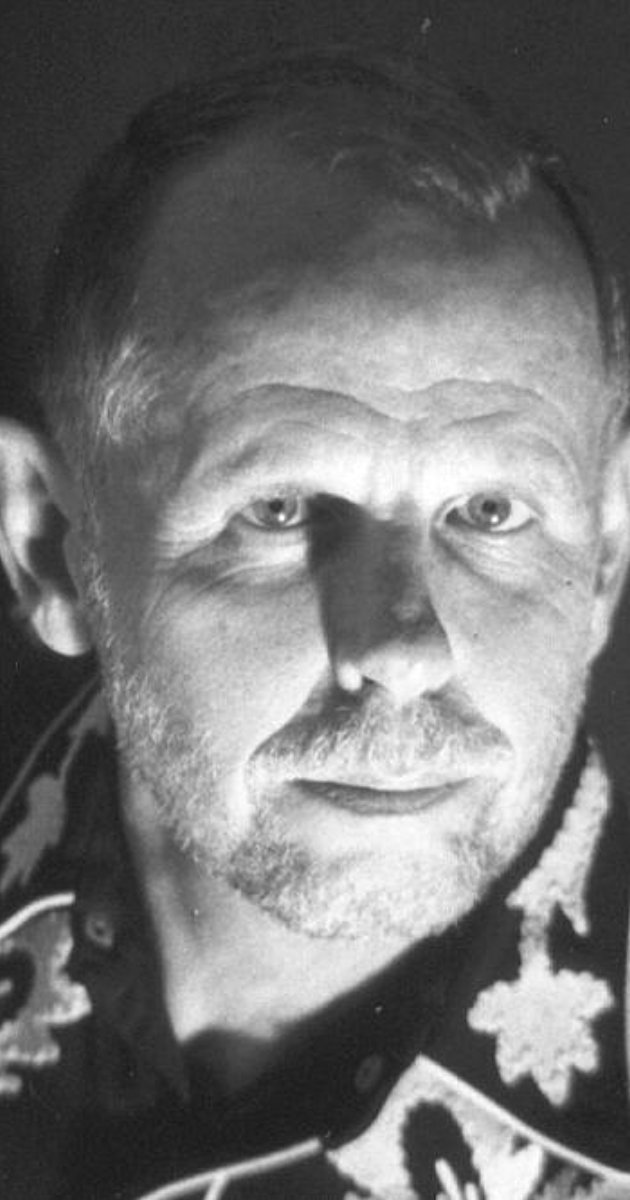
- Robert A. Burns
- Born: 27 May 1944
- Died: 31 May 2004 (aged 60)
- Occupation: Art director
- Years active: 1974–1989
- Notable work: The Texas Chain Saw Massacre; The Howling; Re-Animator

Robert A. Burns (May 27, 1944 – May 31, 2004) was an American art director, production designer, and actor who worked on many films including The Texas Chain Saw Massacre, The Hills Have Eyes, The Howling, Re-Animator, and From Beyond.

== Career ==
Burns attended the University of Texas where he was editor of The Texas Ranger.

Burns met Tobe Hooper at an Austin party and would assist in production of Hooper's 1966 short documentary film Down Friday Street and then design the press kit for Hooper's 1969 film Eggshells.

Burns next worked for Hooper as the casting director and art director of Tobe Hooper's 1974 horror film The Texas Chain Saw Massacre. His work on the film is notable for the realistic "bone decor" of the Sawyer Family's farm house.

His work garnered notice in the industry and work on other future horror classics followed including Wes Craven's The Hills Have Eyes, Joe Dante's The Howling, and Stuart Gordon's Re-Animator.

Burns was also an expert on Rondo Hatton and had aspired to make a film about the actor. His passion was such that he held parties to celebrate Hatton's birthday. Joe M. O'Connell's 2020 documentary titled Rondo and Bob looks at the lives of both Burns and Hatton.

== Death ==
Burns died on May 31, 2004. It was reported that he was suffering from kidney cancer. His death was investigated as a suicide: he had left a farewell note on his website with a photo of himself stretched out in front of a tombstone with his name on it.

== Selected filmography ==
=== Art director ===
- The Texas Chain Saw Massacre
- The Hills Have Eyes
- Tourist Trap
- Don't Go Near the Park
- Disco Godfather
- Microwave Massacre
- The Howling
- Full Moon High
- Re-Animator
- Confessions of a Serial Killer

=== Actor ===
- The Howling – Porn store patron
- Microwave Massacre – Homeless Man
- Confessions of a Serial Killer – Daniel Ray Hawkins
- Walker, Texas Ranger – Man in Overalls (ep. "The Big Bingo Bamboozle")
- The Stars Fell on Henrietta – Franklin

=== Director ===
- Mongrel
