= Microwave Massacre =

- VHS cover
- Directed by: Wayne Berwick
- Screenplay by: Thomas Singer
- Story by: Craig Muckler
- Produced by: Craig Muckler; Thomas Singer
- Starring: Jackie Vernon
- Cinematography: Karen Grossman
- Edited by: Steve Nielson
- Music by: Leif Horvath
- Release dates: 31 October 1979 (Austin, Texas)
- Running time: 76 minutes
- Country: United States
- Language: English

Microwave Massacre is a 1979 American black comedy horror film directed by Wayne Berwick and starring Jackie Vernon.

In the film, a drunk middle-aged man kills his wife during an argument. After eating part of his wife's hand, he acquires a taste for human flesh. He seeks further victims to cannibalize. The killer ignores problems with his pacemaker until they prove fatal.

== Plot ==
Donald is an overweight, middle-aged construction worker with a big problem: his shrew of a wife May has started to only cook gourmet foods in a Hyacinth Bucket–style misguided effort to make themselves seem classier than they are. While his friends Roosevelt and Phillip dine on simple bologna-and-cheese sandwiches for lunch, Donald is saddled with crab sandwiches and other cooking atrocities. To his horror, he discovers his wife has bought an unusually large Major Electric microwave oven, which makes the meals worse in half the time.

After coming home drunk one night and getting into an argument with May, Donald loses his temper and bludgeons her to death with a large salt shaker. He wakes up the next day with a bad hangover, no memory of the night before, and a growling stomach. He discovers May's corpse in the microwave and after the initial wave of horror passes, he starts to take it in stride, telling his co-workers that he and May separated. After work, he then cuts up May's body and stores it in foil wrap in the refrigerator. A running gag involving May's head retaining some sort of sentience is introduced during this scene.

Looking for a midnight snack one night, Donald unintentionally takes a few bites of May's hand, and (again) after the initial wave of horror passes, he realizes it is the best thing he has ever eaten. He even brings some to work with him and shares it with Phillip and Roosevelt, who concur. He soon starts picking up hookers and using them for meat in his recipes.

While cooking one night, Donald has a mild heart attack and goes to his doctor, who tells him of a pacemaker that was put in some years earlier when he had some excess weight, but says he is fine overall. May's equally shrewish sister Evelyn shows up, having not heard from her sister in some time. She demands to see May, but discovers May's severed head in her bed. She is then gagged with bread and tied up in Donald's closet.

Donald's lunches continue to be a hit with his friends, and he decides to cater an outing to a wrestling match with a new recipe he calls "Peking chick." When Roosevelt and Phillip show up to pick up Donald, they discover him dead on the kitchen floor of a heart attack, and some partly cooked body parts in the microwave. They leave in horror and disgust, realizing what Donald had been serving them.

Some time later, the house is up for sale and movers are taking the furniture out. A repairman (director Wayne Berwick, in an uncredited cameo) examines the microwave and discovers a problem with the wires, commenting that it would be bad for someone with a pacemaker. We then zoom into the fridge, which opens to reveal May's head. Her eyes glow orange as the film ends.

== Cast ==
- Jackie Vernon as Donald
- Loren Schein as Roosevelt
- Al Troup as Philip
- Marla Simon as Knothole Girl
- Claire Ginsberg as May
- Lou Ann Webber as Dee Dee Dee
- Anna Marlowe as Chick
- Cindy Gant as Susie Grubb
- Sarah Alt as Evelyn
- Karen Marshall as Neighbor
- Phil De Carlo as Sam
- Aaron Koslow as Salesman
- Ed Thomas as Dr. Von Der Fool
- John Harmon as Dr. Gestalp
- Robert A. Burns as Homeless Man

== Production ==
Microwave Massacre was directed by Wayne Berwick, the son of Irv Berwick, director of films such as The Monster of Piedras Blancas. Wayne Berwick described his upbringing as growing up on the Universal Studios film lots, and was turned on to horror films such as The Beast with Five Fingers. Wayne Berwick did not initially follow his father in work, predominantly working as a sound recordist, and touring Europe as a blues musician, flourishing as West Side Wayne and the Boulevard Band. While doing sound recording work he met friends who were in discussion with associate producers who were writing a script for a film with a budget of about $75,000 and offered Wayne Berwick to direct it.

Two days before shooting Berwick saw the script, and found what was once "creepy understated humor, was completely over the top" and that the script had become "90 pages of one-liners." Berwick found that this was the only approach towards the film and later claimed an influence of John Landis films and Roger Corman's film The Little Shop of Horrors.

Microwave Massacre was shot in late 1979, with a budget of between $70,000 and $80,000.

== Release ==
Microwave Massacre was shown on as a midnight movie on October 31, 1979, in Austin, Texas. In August 2016, Arrow Video released a deluxe HD Blu-Ray (1080p) + SD DVD set featuring a brand new 2K restoration from the original camera negative. Other bonus materials include the original mono audio in uncompressed PCM on the Blu-ray, optional English subtitles for the deaf and hard of hearing, brand new audio commentary with writer-producer Craig Muckler moderated by Mike Tristano, a brand new making-of featurette including interviews with Muckler, director Wayne Berwick and actor Loren Schein, and a reversible sleeve featuring original and newly commissioned artwork. The first pressing came with a fully illustrated collector's booklet featuring new writing on the film by Nightmare USA author Stephen Thrower.

== Critical reception ==
AllMovie wrote, "Despite utterly failing as comedy, horror and pornography, Microwave Massacre is grotesque enough in design and attitude to be fascinating, much like a car accident."
