= KVR =

KVR may refer to:

- Kettle Valley Railway, discontinued railway company in Canada
- Kangra Valley Railway, Mountain railway in Himachal Pradesh, India
- K29HW-D, formerly known as KVR-TV, a student television station in Austin, Texas
