= On Saudi Arabia =

2012 book by Karen Elliott House

On Saudi Arabia: Its People, Past, Religion, Fault Lines—and Future
- cover of the book
- Author: Karen Elliott House
- Language: English
- Subject: human rights, global politics, Saudi Arabia
- Publisher: Knopf
- Publication date: 2012
- Publication place: United States
- Pages: 308
- ISBN: 978-0307473288

On Saudi Arabia: Its People, Past, Religion, Fault Lines—and Future is a book by American journalist Karen Elliott House about the future of Saudi Arabia. House has visited the country for more than 30 years, and she describes the country for regional specialists and public readers alike in her book. The book provides information on human rights and global politics and their importance to the future of Saudi Arabia. It offers insights into the "kingdom's fault lines", as well as suggestions for a positive diplomacy that encourages modest reforms.

== Research ==
Karen Elliott House first traveled to the kingdom of Saudi Arabia in the 1970s. She has entered into poor slums, rich compounds, and the royal family. Also by wearing a burqa, she was also able to enter the most religious families and speak with them. House first began writing about Saudi Arabia for the Wall Street Journal over forty years ago. Since then she has born witness to the country's evolution.

This book draws upon five years of "deep diving" in which House called upon all her diplomatic connections to obtain access to a diverse range of Saudi people. She has talked with terrorists, millionaire playboys, destitute widows, muftis, engineers, university professors, housewives, dissatisfied youth and former princes. The slow reform process in Saudi Arabia, and the gap between people's desire for change and what is really changing, creates a tension within the book that is arresting.

== Content ==
On Saudi Arabia can be divided into three sections. The first section addresses what House describes as "the fragility of the kingdom whose traditional sources of stability have been religion and the royal family" and how "both are losing credibility and control." Second, she examines the lines that divide "a sullen society in which Saudis are increasingly discontented with poor education; a stultified economy; widespread youth unemployment; repression of women; poverty; corruption; and a government that is not efficient, transparent, or accountable."

The third section of the book addresses potential outcomes. House compares the Saudi regime to the last days of the Soviet Union and writes: "Today's Saudi Arabia is all too reminiscent of the late stages of the old Soviet Union in which an aged Brezhnev is succeeded by an infirm Andropov, who is followed by a doddering Chernenko before a new-generation leader like Gorbachev could try — and fail — to effect genuine reform." She also asks what the kingdom's "longtime American protector can do to help shape the Saudi future."

House describes the society of Saudi Arabia as a maze "in which Saudis endlessly maneuver through winding paths between high walls of religious rules, government restrictions and cultural traditions." She anticipates a kind of explosion and overthrow in the Saudi kingdom, and suggests that two groups - women and youth - are increasingly furious and likely to act on their concerns. According to House 60 percent of Saudis are younger than 18.

The book devotes a complete chapter to the condition of Saudi women. She argues that while 60 percent of the country's university graduates are women, they constitute only 12 percent of the country's employed. Meanwhile, the poorest class of society are widowed or divorced women without men, who are left searching for work as they attempt to support their children.

Another topic that the book discusses is the support of terrorism. House describes Saudi government efforts to rehabilitate former terrorists and reintegrate them into Saudi society. She mentions that WikiLeaks quoted then-Secretary of State Hillary Rodham Clinton in 2010 as saying that Saudis "constitute the most significant source of funding to Sunni terrorist groups worldwide." As House notes, Saudi Arabia has remained largely quiet even during the Arab Spring because of a heavy Saudi security presence.

About the economic system, the author believes that Saudis are paralyzed by an economy based almost solely on oil and government handouts. The book also delves into the issue of poverty in Saudi Arabia where forty percent of the population gets by on less than $850 a month. She says under the strict control of Wahhabi fundamentalists, the education system cannot prepare the Saudis to take up specialized jobs and professions. Because they refuse working in blue-collar and service areas, 90 percent of private-sector jobs are held by foreign workers.

According to House, Al Saud "have run their country like a family corporation with zero accountability." A backward educational system and extremist religious ideologies are stifling talent in every field. House argues that over time, the Saudi economy will become less innovative, less diversified and less modern. "They have instituted policies that have crippled their intellectuals, their artists, their businessmen and women, and even their own princes."
