= Rowland B. Wilson =

American cartoonist (1930-2005)

Rowland Bragg Wilson
- Born: August 3, 1930 Dallas, Texas, U.S.
- Died: June 28, 2005 (aged 74) Encinitas, California, U.S.
- Areas: Cartoonist, Illustrator, Animator
- Spouse: Suzanne Lemieux

Rowland Bragg Wilson (August 3, 1930 – June 28, 2005) was an American gag cartoonist and animation production artist who did watercolor cartoon illustrations for leading magazines, notably Playboy (beginning in 1967) and TV Guide and The New Yorker.

== Career ==
Born in Dallas, Texas, the young Wilson was passionate about the funnies and the movies. He was an honors student in liberal arts at the University of Texas at Austin, where he drew cartoons for the college humor magazine, The Texas Ranger. (While at UT, he created the magazine's mascot — a fat, mustachioed outlaw-type called "Hairy Ranger.") A number of the cartoons Wilson did for The Texas Ranger were reprinted by Dell's 1000 Jokes in an ongoing feature, "Varsity Varieties". This led to a series of caricature covers Wilson did for 1000 Jokes.

Wilson did his graduate work in art history at Columbia University. He was an art director with Young & Rubicam and moved to Weston, Connecticut. Wilson illustrated children's books including Al Perkins' Tubby and the Lantern, and attracted much attention with his series of cartoons for the New England Life Insurance ad campaign. He also illustrated humorous books, including Steve Allen's Bigger Than a Breadbox, as well as compiling a book of his own cartoons, The Whites of Their Eyes (Dutton, 1962).

His gag cartoons were published in Esquire, Playboy, The New Yorker, The Saturday Evening Post, Collier's and other magazines.

In the early 1970s, Wilson worked in London for the Richard Williams animation studio. When he returned to the United States, he worked in New York at the Phil Kimmelman animation studio, creating two award-winning sequences for "Schoolhouse Rock". After moving to California he was a pre-production concept designer at the Walt Disney studio, working on The Little Mermaid, The Hunchback of Notre Dame, Tarzan and Hercules, among others. His wife, Suzanne Lemieux Wilson, did concept art on several animated features, including Titan A.E. and Anastasia.

Wilson lived in La Costa, California. At age 74, he died of heart failure at Scripps Memorial Hospital in Encinitas, California. He was survived by his wife and his four daughters, Amanda, Reed, Kendra and Megan Wilson.

== Books ==
- Rowland B. Wilson's Trade Secrets: Notes for Cartooning and Animation by Rowland B. and Suzanne Lemieux Wilson (Focal Press, June 2012)
- The Whites of Their Eyes (Dutton, 1962)

== Awards ==
He received a daytime Emmy Award for his animation on Schoolhouse Rock! and several D&AD awards whilst at the Richard Williams studio.
