= Confessions of a Serial Killer =

- Directed by: Mark Blair
- Written by: Mark Blair
- Produced by: Cecyle Osgoode Rexrode
- Starring: Robert A. Burns; Dennis Hill; Berkley Garrett
- Cinematography: Layton Blaylock
- Edited by: Sheri Galloway
- Music by: William Penn
- Production company: Cedarwood Productions
- Release date: November 14, 1985
- Running time: 89 minutes / 95 minutes
- Country: United States
- Language: English

Confessions of a Serial Killer is a 1985 American horror film directed by Mark Blair. Preceding Henry: Portrait of a Serial Killer by one year, the film details a serial killer (based on Henry Lee Lucas) who, after being arrested, confesses to the murders of over 200 women.

== Synopsis ==
Daniel Ray (Robert A. Burns) has been arrested and much to the surprise and horror of the police officers, he begins to confess to the murders of over 200 women. He also talks about his background as a childhood abuse victim and runaway before meeting Moon (Dennis Hill) and Molly (Sidney Brammer), who accompanied him on several of his murders. This proves to be too much for Sheriff Will Gaines (Berkley Garrett) to believe, only for Daniel Ray to describe the events that led to his capture and arrest.

== Cast ==
- Robert A. Burns as Daniel Ray Hawkins
- Dennis Hill as Moon Lewton
- Berkley Garrett as Sheriff Will Gaines
- Sidney Brammer as Molly Lewton
- DeeDee Norton as Monica Krivics (as Dee Dee Norton)
- Ollie Handley as Doctor Earl Krivics
- Demp Toney as Doris Simpson
- Lainie Frasier as Stranded Motorist (as Lainie Ferrante)
- Eleese Lester as Karen Grimes
- Colom L. Keating as Detective Barnes (as Colom Keating)
- Dayna Blackwell as Girl Hitchhiker
- John Browning as Doctor Spivey
- Carla Edson as Honkytonk Girl
- Gene Grottke as Deputy Sheriff
- Brady Coleman as Arresting Officer #1

== Reception ==
AllMovie compared Confessions of a Serial Killer to the 1986 film Henry: Portrait of a Serial Killer, saying that "where Henry's flat, non-judgmental documentary style served to amplify the horror of the proceedings, this film's depiction of the killings draws too heavily on slasher-movie conventions, which rob the story of its potency". TV Guide gave the film a rating of 2 1/2 stars out of 4.
