= Jerry Marcus =

American cartoonist

Jerry Marcus (June 27, 1924, Brooklyn, New York – July 22, 2005, Waterbury, Connecticut) was a prolific freelance gag cartoonist who also created the syndicated newspaper comic strip Trudy.

A high school drop-out, Marcus was rejected by the Navy during World War II as underweight, so in 1943, he signed on with the Merchant Marine, shipping out on aviation fuel tankers in the North Atlantic. After gaining the required weight, he joined the Navy and was assigned to the Seabees in the Philippines.

After his 1946 discharge, he attended New York's Cartoonists and Illustrators School. As a freelancer, he was published in The New Yorker, Look, The Saturday Evening Post, Ladies' Home Journal and other leading magazines.

== Trudy ==
When he launched Trudy in 1963, it was distributed to more than 75 newspapers by King Features Syndicate. Homemaker Trudy finds time to manage the house, her husband, their children and pets, including the family cat, Fatkat.

Marcus was 81 when he died in 2005 after a long illness.
