= John Norment =

American cartoonist (1911–1988)

- Born: John Webb; November 28, 1911; Lebanon, TN
- Died: April 16, 1988 (aged 76); Westport, CT
- Education: Art Institute of Chicago Chicago Academy of Fine Arts
- Known for: Visual Art

John Murray Norment (1911–1988) was an American illustrator, gag cartoonist, magazine editor, artist, and photographer.

Born in Lebanon, Tennessee, Norment attended the Art Institute of Chicago and the Chicago Academy of Fine Arts in 1933–34, and he exhibited in the Chicago No-Jury Society of Artists annual shows in 1934, 1936, 1937, 1939 and 1940. At the Iannelli Studio in 1935–36, he did textile designs for Montgomery Ward and posters for Carson Pirie. In 1935, he was employed as an assistant to the art director of Esquire, continuing with cartoons and ideas for Esquire from 1938 to 1942.

During World War II, Norment was a combat correspondent-photographer with the US Coast Guard in the North Atlantic, the Pacific and the China Sea. Returning to civilian life, he worked during the post-World War II years as a photographer for the Wittrup Studio in New York and Chicago's Sundblom Studio, where he photographed the Haddon Sundblom Santa Claus paintings for Coca-Cola.

== Gag cartoons ==
In 1948, he did freelance gag cartoons for Look, Punch, The Philadelphia Inquirer, True, Argosy and Ladies’ Home Journal. Norment was an editor of humor magazines at Dell Publishing, including 1000 Jokes, from 1954 to 1965, and during that same period he edited Cartoonist for the National Cartoonists Society. In the mid-1960s, he edited A Million Laughs magazine for Laugh Publications.

From 1966 to 1968, Norment worked with Norcross Greeting Cards and the Famous Artists School. In 1968, he began selling watercolors and serigraphs at local studios and galleries in Connecticut. The New Yorker published covers by Norment on the March 6, 1978 issue and the January 28, 1980 issue.

Norment sometimes performed as a vocalist with Connecticut's Peppermill Jazz Band. He was married to Betty Teare Norment, who died in 1978. The couple had no children. Norment died in Westport, Connecticut in 1988.

== Awards ==
In 1972, the National Cartoonists Society honored him with their Silver T-Square Award.
