= Trudy (comics) =

American comic strip by Jerry Marcus

- Author: Jerry Marcus
- Current status/schedule: Concluded daily & Sunday strip
- Launch date: March 18, 1963
- End date: August 20, 2005
- Syndicate(s): King Features Syndicate
- Genre: Humor

Trudy is the title character of a comic strip about a suburban homemaker by Jerry Marcus which debuted on March 18, 1963. It was syndicated until August 20, 2005, after Marcus died on July 22 of that year.

King Features Syndicate distributed the Sunday and daily strips to more than 200 newspapers worldwide.

== Characters and story ==
Homemaker Trudy finds time to manage the house, her husband, their children and pets, including the family cat, Fatkat.

Marcus claimed the central character of Trudy was based on his mother, who had to raise four children in a Brooklyn cold-water flat after his father died when he was three years old.
