= Larry C. Price =

American photojournalist (born 1954)

Larry C. Price (born February 23, 1954) is an American photojournalist who has won two Pulitzer Prizes. In 1981, he won the Pulitzer Prize in Spot News Photography, recognizing images from Liberia published by the Fort Worth Star-Telegram. In 1985, he won the Pulitzer Prize for Feature Photography for images from war-torn Angola and El Salvador published by The Philadelphia Inquirer.

== Early life ==
Born and raised in Corpus Christi, Texas, Price attended Sam Houston State University and then transferred to the University of Texas at Austin from which he received a Bachelor of Journalism degree in 1977. He was a member of The Daily Texan staff during his senior year in college.

== Career ==
After college, he joined the El Paso Times staff. He then worked on the news staff at the Fort Worth Star-Telegram. During that time (1979-1983), Price also was a visiting professor at the University of Texas at Austin.

In 1983, he left Fort Worth for The Philadelphia Inquirer to work as a photojournalist and later director of photography. After leaving the Inquirer in 1989, Price worked on contract for National Geographic before returning to the Fort Worth Star-Telegram as an assistant managing editor in 1991. In 1996, Price joined The Baltimore Sun photography staff. He was named assistant managing editor for photography for The Denver Post in 2000 where he remained until mid-2006. Price worked on a photographic collection showing the life of black cowboys in 2004 and 2005. In 2013, grants from the Pulitzer Center on Crisis Reporting funded Price's project to document child labor in developing countries. Price produced an episode of PBS NewsHour, "Hazardous Work: Diving into the Philippines’ Dangerous Underwater Mines", which received an Emmy for outstanding investigative journalism in a regularly scheduled newscast in 2015. In 2019, Price was one of the winners of the 70th Annual George Polk Awards from Long Island University, being honored for Environmental Reporting for a series of reports on deadly particulate pollutants in seven countries.

Price has received a Best Photographic Reporting award from the Overseas Press Club and has been honored at the World Press Photo Awards. His images have appeared in Time, Newsweek, National Geographic, U.S. News & World Report, Audubon and other national publications. Price has contributed to 12 Day in the Life photography books including the acclaimed A Day in the Life of America, A Day in the Life of the Soviet Union, and A Day in the Life of Africa.
