= Ballyhoo (magazine) =

Defunct humor publication

- Editor: Norman Anthony (1931–1939); Bill Yates (1952–1954)
- Categories: Satirical magazine
- Frequency: Monthly
- Circulation: 2,000,000 (1930s)
- Publisher: George T. Delacorte Jr.
- First issue: 1931; 94 years ago (relaunch #1) 1948 (relaunch #2) 1952
- Final issue: 1939; 86 years ago (relaunch #2) 1954
- Company: Dell Publishing
- Country: United States
- Language: English

Ballyhoo was a humor magazine published by Dell Publishing, created by George T. Delacorte Jr., and edited by Norman Anthony (former editor of Life and Judge), from 1931 until 1939, with a couple of attempts to resuscitate the magazine (now edited by Bill Yates) after the war between 1948 and 1954.

In common with other magazines of the era, it featured a central section dedicated to one-off cartoons, but in the surrounding pages, it presented spoof ads and articles much in the manner later popularized by the 1950s magazine Mad. When questioned about this at a gathering of the British SSI (Society of Strip Illustration), "the usual gang of idiots" from Mad were unequivocal in their response: "We know nuthin', and what's more we ain't sayin'."

Delacorte's publishing history up to this point had been in digest-sized magazines of the kind not normally of interest to advertisers, so spoofing advertisements in Ballyhoo held no fears for him. Launched during the worst of the Great Depression, the first issue sold out within a week. Real advertisers flocked to place ads. However, Anthony was concerned real ads would not be in the true spirit of Ballyhoo and demanded they should fit in with the magazine's editorial policy. What this actually resulted in was the Ballyhoo editorial staff writing the advertising dialogue, leaving very little difference between the real and spoof ads. An ad for a radio kicked off with the banner line, "Now! All the crap in the world... at your fingertips!" and ended with "...It will do everything but give you good programs and Gawd knows no set will do that" while a spoof ad merely pointed out the advantages of balanced radio. A balanced radio will stand on the window ledge so you can receive a decent signal, whilst an unbalanced radio will fall off.

Ballyhoo's success led to a number of imitators (one even called itself Hullaballo), and requests to use the Ballyhoo brand name to sell almost everything from board games to bras; in 1931 the magazine inspired the Ballyhoo pinball machine. In 1932, a stage revue, Ballyhoo of 1932, was produced in Newark, starring the Howard Brothers. The sketches were written by editor Norman Anthony, with costume design and set design by illustrator Russell Patterson, and music composed by Lewis Gensler.

Sales reached 1.5 million after five issues, and peaked at almost two million, but started slipping towards the end of the decade when the decision was taken to close the magazine down. There were two attempts to relaunch, one in 1948, and another in 1952. Coincidentally, this final attempt folded in 1954, the year before Mad changed from comic book format to magazine format.

== Other publications called Ballyhoo ==
In the 1960s, the title Ballyhoo was used for a men's magazine, which also failed. According to the Magazine Data File, there was a 1950s British Ballyhoo, which was probably unrelated to the American magazine. According to The Fiction Mags Index, there was a later 1950s Australian Ballyhoo humor magazine which reprinted earlier editions of the American magazine.
