= Redeye (comics) =

Comic strip created by Gordon Bess

- Gordon Bess's Redeye (July 21, 1973)
- Author(s): Gordon Bess (1967–1988); Bill Yates (1988–1999); Mel Casson (1999–2008)
- Illustrator: Mel Casson (1988–2008)
- Current status/schedule: Concluded daily strip
- Launch date: September 11, 1967
- End date: July 13, 2008
- Syndicate(s): King Features Syndicate
- Genre(s): Humor, Native Americans

Redeye is a comic strip created by cartoonist Gordon Bess that was syndicated by King Features Syndicate to more than 100 newspapers. The strip debuted on September 11, 1967, and ran until July 13, 2008.

== Publication history ==
Bess wrote and drew the strip from 1967 until 1988, when he was forced by illness to pass it on to Bill Yates (writing) and Mel Casson (artwork). Casson took over both roles in 1999 when Bill Yates became ill. Yates died in 2001. Casson continued the strip alone from 1999 until his own death in May 2008. Casson was not replaced, and publication ended as submitted material ran out. The strip came to an end on July 13, 2008.

In recent years, a small number of newspapers have been carrying the strip on Sundays only, reprinting from the 1988-99 Yates/Casson era.

== Characters and story ==
Redeye is a comic about a tribe of Native Americans during the 19th century, portraying the Indians in a similar way as what Hägar the Horrible did with the Vikings. It has also been compared to Tumbleweeds.

- Redeye, overweight chief of the Chickiepan tribe.
- Tanglefoot, a cowardly and stupid warrior who is in love with Redeye's daughter.
- Mawsquaw, a bossy, very overweight wife who is a terrible cook.
- Tawnee, Redeye's beautiful daughter.
- Pokey, Redeye's younger son, a practical joker.
- Granny, Redeye's liquors-hungry widowed mother (sometimes known as Minnie).
- A medicine man who is only interested in playing golf and seducing the nurse.
- Jerkymiah, an extremely dirty, bearded trapper.
- Various talking animals, including Loco, Redeye's steed.

== Books ==
Beginning in 1968, Redeye was collected in paperbacks published by Saalfield Publishing.

== Awards ==
Redeye was especially popular in Europe, where it appeared in Tintin magazine between 1969 and 1990 and received the 1976 Best Foreign Comical Work Award at the Angoulême International Comics Festival.

== Translations ==
- Danish: Rødøje, some albums by Carlsen Verlag
- Dutch: Roodvoet het Indiaantje in the Flemish newspaper Het Laatste Nieuws in 1968, and Roodoog in Kuifje, the Dutch translation of Tintin, and in 9 albums between 1972 and 1985
- Finnish: Punasulka, few albums starting from 1976
- French: La tribu terrible, in Tintin magazine from 1969 until 1990; Plume d'oeuf, in Le Républicain Lorrain (newspaper) from circa 1968 until this day
- German: Feuerauge, 2 albums in 1973, and Häuptling Feuerauge, in Zack magazine between 1974 and 1980: also the subject of a radio drama in 1977
- Italian: La tribù terribile, in the magazine Corriere dei Ragazzi in 1974
- Norwegian: Rødøye, secondary recurring strip in Billy (Beetle Bailey magazine), from 1976
- Portuguese: Olho Vermelho 1 album in 1971, and Touro Sentado, in Gibi magazine in 1974 in Brazil
- Spanish: Ojo Rojo in the magazine El Cuco and La Tribu Terrible in the Chilean children's magazine Mampato.
- Swedish: Rödöga, 1 album in 1979 with Semic Press, 1 album in 1990 by Carlsen, three pocket books by Carlsen (1976–1978), 1 pocket book by Carlsen/Semic (1988) long-time secondary recurring strip in Knasen (Beetle Bailey magazine)
