= Ben Sargent =

American cartoonist

Ben Sargent (born November 26, 1948) is an American editorial cartoonist. He began drawing editorial cartoons for the Austin American-Statesman in 1974 and retired in 2009. His cartoons were distributed nationally by Universal Press Syndicate. He then continued his cartooning career at the Texas Observer.

== Biography ==
Sargent was born in Amarillo, Texas, into a newspaper family. He learned the printing trade from age twelve and started working for the local daily as a proof runner at fourteen. He attended Amarillo College and received a Bachelor of Journalism degree from the University of Texas at Austin in 1970.

Sargent won the Pulitzer Prize for Editorial Cartooning in 1982. He has also received awards from Women in Communications, Inc., Common Cause of Texas, and Cox Newspapers.

He is the author of Texas Statehouse Blues (1980) and Big Brother Blues (1984).

Sargent is married to Diane Holloway, former television critic for the Austin American-Statesman; Sargent and Holloway both retired from the paper in March 2009. They have two children, Sam and Elizabeth.

In a profile published in the January 2005 issue of The Good Life magazine, Sargent stated, "As a newspaper journalist, you're professionally obligated to be fair, accurate, complete and balanced. But there are two pages in the back of the paper where we're obligated to be fair, accurate and complete—but we don't have to be 'balanced.' I'm not a pollster. To me, you're obligated as an opinion journalist to express your views no matter what the politics of the day. If you don't, then people will say, 'Why should I read what this guy's saying? He doesn't even know where he stands?' That makes your position as an opinion journalist kind of useless."
