= Karen Elliott House =

American journalist (born 1947)

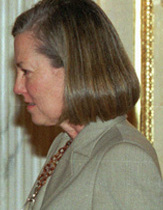
- House in 2002
- Born: December 7, 1947 (age 78); Matador, Texas, U.S.
- Education: University of Texas at Austin (B.A.)
- Occupation: Journalist
- Spouse: Peter R. Kann

Karen Elliott House (born December 7, 1947) is an American journalist and former managing editor at The Wall Street Journal and its parent company Dow Jones. She served as President of Dow Jones International and then publisher of the Wall Street Journal before her retirement in the spring of 2006. Her awards include a Pulitzer Prize.

== Biography ==
=== Early life ===
A native of Matador, Texas, House received a bachelor's degree in journalism from the University of Texas at Austin, where she was editor of the university's newspaper, The Daily Texan. She was also a member of Orange Jackets, an honorary organization for women at UT.

=== Career ===
She joined the Journal as a reporter in 1974. She was named assistant foreign editor in 1983; foreign editor in 1984; vice-president of the Dow Jones International Group; and president of the International Group in 1995. In 1984, House was awarded a Pulitzer Prize in international reporting for her coverage of the Middle East while a reporter with the Wall Street Journal. The prize was awarded for a series of interviews with Jordan's King Hussein, which anticipated the problems Ronald Reagan's Middle East peace plan would face. She is also the recipient of the Overseas Press Club's Bob Considine Award for best daily newspaper interpretation of foreign affairs (1984 and 1988); the University of Southern California's Distinguished Achievement in Journalism Award (1983); Georgetown University's Edward Weintal Award for distinguished coverage of American foreign policy (1980); and the National Press Club's Edwin M. Hood Award for Excellence in Diplomatic Reporting (1982).

In 2002, she was appointed publisher by the board of Dow Jones. As publisher she was the architect of the Journal's Weekend Edition, among other ambitious and often controversial projects. At the Journal, House worked under her husband, Peter R. Kann, Dow Jones CEO and chairman of the board from 1992 until 2006. In February 2007, House wrote a series of articles for the WSJ following a month-long tour of Saudi Arabia.

She is a board member of both the Council on Foreign Relations and Boston University, where she befriended the university's late president and chancellor John Silber. At his memorial service on November 29, 2012, she recalled how he was fired as the dean of the College of Arts and Sciences at the University of Texas in 1970 while she was writing about him as a beginning reporter. She serves on RAND Corporation's board of trustees. She is married and is the mother of four children.

== Books ==
- On Saudi Arabia: Its People, Past, Religion, Fault Lines - and Future (New York: Alfred P. Knopf, 2013).
- Kingdom of Sand and Cement: The Shifting Cultural Landscape of Saudi Arabia by Peter Bogaczewicz, Edward Burtynsky, Rodrigo Orrantia, Karen Elliott House
- The Man Who Would Be King: Mohammed bin Salman and the Transformation of Saudi Arabia (New York: Harper, 2025).

== Viewpoints ==
Karen Elliott House mentioned in her book "On Saudi Arabia: Its People, Past, Religion, Fault Lines—and Future" that she believes that Saudi Arabia's internal problems are deeper than its external problems. Finding a job for the new generation of unemployed youth has become a big problem in the absence of high oil revenues, writes House, and the best thing that the Saudi regime can do in this situation, is to magnify the chaos in the region in the eyes of its people to such an extent that Saudis consider Al-Saud's relative stability better than anything else.In an interview with Haaretz newspaper in 2025, House said that she had met Crown prince Mohammed bin Salman multiple times and unlike others in the royal house, he did not say one thing in private and another in public.
