= Gordon Bess =

American comics artist

- Born: January 12, 1929 Richfield, Utah, U.S.
- Died: November 24, 1989 (aged 60) Boise, Idaho, U.S.
- Area: Cartoonist
- Notable works: Redeye (1967–1988)

Gordon C. Bess (January 12, 1929 – November 24, 1989) was an American cartoonist, best known for the comic strip Redeye.

Born in Richfield, Utah, Bess grew up attending schools in Nevada, Oregon, and Utah, finishing high school in Hailey, Idaho. In 1947, he enlisted in the Marines and was sent to boot camp in San Diego. He created illustrations, posters and charts for the Corps Training Aids Section in San Diego.

After a year of service in South Korea, clearing minefields, he arrived back in San Francisco on the day the war ended. In 1954, he was sent to Washington, D.C., where he became a staff cartoonist and the cartoon editor for Leatherneck Magazine, where Joanne Vaught was an administrative assistant. The two married in 1955, living in Arlington, Virginia. Continuing with Leatherneck until 1956, he left the Corps with the rank of Staff Sergeant. In 1957, he moved to New Jersey. After a year as a commercial artist in Philadelphia, he took a job as the art director for a greeting card company in Cincinnati, Ohio. In his spare time, he freelanced cartoons to magazines.

Cartoon by Gordon Bess

== Redeye ==
On September 11, 1967, King Features Syndicate launched his comic strip Redeye, about a wacky Indian tribe. With Redeye in 400 American newspapers and translations into 15 languages, the success of the strip enabled him to move in 1970 to 310 Balmoral Road in Boise, Idaho, where he enjoyed hunting, fishing, dirt bike riding, skiing and playing blackjack in Nevada.

His Redeye routine involved waking at 7am and descending to his basement office, sometimes for ten-hour sessions and on weekends, working six months in advance. During summers, he drew the strip while staying at his cabin in Lowman, Idaho.

Bess and his wife had three children—Suzie (born 1956), Richard (born 1960) and Debbie (born 1963). He continued writing and drawing Redeye until 1988, when he fell ill and drew his last for the May 21, 1988 issue. He died November 24, 1989. Born February 22, 1930, Joanne Vaught Bess died June 8, 2012.

== Awards ==
Redeye was especially popular in Europe, where it appeared in Tintin magazine between 1969 and 1990. Bess received the 1976 Best Foreign Comical Work Award at the Angoulême International Comics Festival.
