= KVRX =

Student radio station at the University of Texas at Austin

- Austin, Texas; United States
- Broadcast area: Austin-Round Rock metropolitan area
- Frequency: 91.7 MHz
- Branding: KVRX 91.7 FM

Programming
- Format: Freeform and specialty music, community programming, sports

Ownership
- Owner: University of Texas at Austin
- Sister stations: KUT, KUTX, KOOP

History
- First air date: April 18, 1988 (cable only); November 15, 1994 (over-the-air)
- Former call signs: KTSB (1988–1994)
- Call sign meaning: Disambiguation of sister television station KVR (K09VR, now K29HW-D)

Technical information
- ERP: 3,000 watts
- HAAT: 26 meters (85 ft)
- Transmitter coordinates: 30.267°N 97.674°W

Links
- Website: http://www.kvrx.org/

KVRX (91.7 FM) is a student-run radio station owned by the University of Texas in Austin, Texas, with an effective radiated power of 3,000 watts. KVRX's studios are based in the Hearst Student Media Building on the university campus on Whitis Avenue near the intersection of Whitis Avenue and Dean Keaton Street, just a block east of Guadalupe Street and immediately south of Dean Keaton Street, while its transmitter is located off Harold Court in East Austin.

The university shares the license for 91.7 with KOOP, a community radio station based in Austin. Students broadcast on KVRX from 7 p.m. to 9 a.m. Monday through Friday and from 10 p.m. to 9 a.m. Saturday and Sunday. KOOP, operated by the Texas Educational Broadcasting Cooperative, covers the remainder of the weekly schedule with programs hosted by community volunteers. KVRX also broadcasts 24 hours a day, seven days a week, over the internet at kvrx.org and can be received via iTunes, TuneIn, and an iPhone app.

== History ==
In the spring of 1986, students at the University of Texas at Austin formed a committee called the Student Radio Task Force with the intention of raising both institutional and student support for a campus radio station. Two years later, SRTF had secured the support of Texas Student Publications (now Texas Student Media, the University organization which houses all student media and publication outlets). Before receiving its broadcasting license, the fledgling station used the call sign KTSB, and began its first narrowcast via cable television on April 18, 1988.

KTSB's call letters were changed to KVRX nearly six years later in January 1994, after the FCC approved a unique time-share agreement between KTSB and KOOP for the 91.7 FM frequency, the last remaining non-commercial frequency in Austin (the call letters "KTSB" were already in use by another station in Iowa, necessitating the change). KVRX would go on to broadcast on the FM frequency on November 15, 1994.

== Programming ==
KVRX's slogan is "None of the Hits, All of the Time," and more recently, "Your Texas Independent Music Authority." Both refer to the station's alternative programming. KVRX's format includes music, news, sports, and community programming, including the popular "Local Live" segment that airs every Sunday from 10 to 11 p.m. CST. "Local Live" features both local and nationally touring musical acts in live, in-studio broadcast performances and interviews. KVRX only plays music that is not featured on commercial media outlets, and the varied community programs cover local, national, and worldwide issues that often do not get covered in mainstream print and broadcast outlets. Notable artists that have performed on "Local Live" to later gain greater recognition include The Black Keys, Spoon, ...And You Will Know Us by the Trail of Dead, Death Cab For Cutie, Ratatat, Shearwater, Kinky Friedman, Acid Mothers Temple, Animal Collective, Explosions in the Sky, Mitski, and Daniel Johnston. Another program nearly as old as the station itself is "Lone Star Lullabies," which features a playlist of all-Texas music.

In addition to its radio programming, KVRX maintains an active presence in the Austin independent music scene by organizing live concerts and official shows, including during the South by Southwest music festival each spring. The station's Music Directors produce a weekly "Topless 39" chart that tracks the 39 albums receiving the most plays that week. In 2010, the station launched its own dedicated YouTube channel. In 2019, the station hosted its very first music festival named KVRX Fest, the largest ever student-run music festival. It featured two days of live music split between Austin venues Cheer Up Charlies and Symphony Square. Notable artists include Frankie Cosmos, Fat Tony, Drab Majesty, and Video Age, among others. KVRX has been described as a "nationally respected station and blueprint for many other college frequencies."

KVRX is part of Texas Student Media (officially Texas Student Publications), an auxiliary establishment of the University of Texas and the largest student media operation in the United States. KVRX is funded by underwriting, fundraising events, an annual pledge drive, listener contributions, and sponsored public service announcements.

== Local Live ==
Local Live is a live in-studio broadcast airing on Sundays at 10 p.m. which features local Texas artists. It is broadcast both on the 91.7 FM frequency and on TSTV's television broadcast.

== Interviews ==
KVRX conducts in-house interviews with local and touring artists and bands, both in video and written formats. A few notable artists that have been interviewed at KVRX include Black Country, New Road, Balu Brigada, and Britt Daniel.

== Notable alumni ==
- Britt Daniel, 1992-1995 (Spoon)
- Lotic (electronic musician)
- Jonathan Toubin (professional DJ and founder of New York Night Train)

== See also ==
- List of radio stations in Texas
