= KOOP (FM) =

Community radio station in Hornsby–Austin, Texas

- Hornsby, Texas; United States
- Broadcast area: Austin-Round Rock metropolitan area
- Frequency: 91.7 MHz

Programming
- Format: Community radio

Ownership
- Owner: Texas Educational Broadcasting Co-operative, Inc.

History
- First air date: December 17, 1994
- Call sign meaning: Co-op

Technical information
- Licensing authority: FCC
- Facility ID: 65320
- Class: A
- ERP: 3,000 watts
- HAAT: 26 meters
- Transmitter coordinates: 30°16′0.7″N 97°40′28.0″W

Links
- Public license information: Public file; LMS
- Website: koop.org

KOOP (91.7 FM) (pronounced 'co-op') is a noncommercial community radio station, licensed to Hornsby, Texas. It is owned and operated by its members, and is licensed to Texas Educational Broadcasting Co-operative, Inc, a nonprofit organization (doing business as KOOP Radio, previously Austin Co-op Radio). The station serves Austin, Texas on 91.7 MHz with an effective radiated power of 3 kilowatts. It was assigned the KOOP call letters by the Federal Communications Commission on October 27, 1993.

The 91.7 frequency is shared with KVRX, the student radio station for The University of Texas at Austin. KOOP broadcasts on 91.7 FM from 9 am to 7 pm. Monday through Friday and from 9 am to 10 pm Saturday and Sunday. KVRX, which is licensed to the University, broadcasts during the remaining hours. KOOP streams online during KVRX's broadcast hours. KOOP's studios and transmitter are located separately in East Austin.

== Programming format ==
KOOP's radio format consists of 75 locally produced shows each week. Daytime programming typically consists of music programs, while late afternoon programming is usually news.

== Awards ==
The KOOP radio station has won 19 Best of Austin awards from the Austin Chronicle from 1994 to 2006. In 1994 the station shared the Austin Music Awards honor for "Best Thing To Happen in Austin" with KVRX.

== DJS ==
- Thorne Webb Dreyer

== Early history ==
=== Founder ===
The Austin Co-op Radio project was initiated by James R. (Jim) Ellinger, whose community radio experience included social justice programming for prisoners, broadcast on KOPN-FM in Columbia, Missouri; local information programming on KAZI-FM in Austin, Texas; and engagement with NFCB (the National Federation of Community Broadcasters and AMARC (l'Association Internationale des Radiodiffuseurs Communautaires / World Association of Community Radio Broadcasters). He also worked with cooperatives in the areas of housing and food. He released a first call-out for interested persons in December 1983. The first official meeting was held March 28, 1984, and a newsletter including the minutes was published.

=== Locating a frequency and a tower site ===
In January 1984, nine individuals and five local businesses including a bookstore, a record store, and a local free weekly contributed $10 each towards a frequency search. The $140 raised was sent to Broadcast Technical Services, which by June 1984 had identified the sole full-power FM channel open in the Austin area - 91.7 FM, channel no. 218.

One obstacle in having the FCC grant a license was a 1972 treaty to counter "border blaster" stations that broadcast from Mexico, which affected the application because of the proximity to Mexico. Ellinger and the group lobbied Texas' Sen. Lloyd Bentsen and were successful in having the treaty changed, freeing up the frequency.

Applications for new noncommercial frequencies, however, had been frozen by the FCC and were not lifted until July 1985. Although two members, Judy Douglass and Tom Donahue, formed a cable broadcasting committee, the main effort was still focused on over the air broadcasting. In July 1986, board members Jim Ellinger and Michelle Rosenberg signed a lease with the nonprofit Center for Maximum Potential Building Systems, located in Hornsby, Texas, for space to erect a broadcasting tower.

=== Formal organization ===
During 1985, Austin Co-op Radio was incorporated with the State of Texas, had its bylaws approved by the National Federation of Community Broadcasters, and received charitable status from the city of Austin. In January 1986, the registered name of the organization was officially changed to Texas Educational Broadcasting Co-operative, Inc. In May 1986, the Internal Revenue Service approved its 501(c)3 charitable status; in June, the state approved tax exempt status.

According to the author of the Bylaws, Hunter Ellinger:

KOOP bylaws contain two main sets of provisions to protect democracy:

1) The Community Board is to be elected annually from eight different constituencies (20% by station volunteers, 15% by individual dues-paying members, 15% by organizational dues-paying members, 10% by Hispanic community organizations, 10% by women's community organizations, 10% by youth/student community organizations, 10% by co-op community organizations, and 10% by other community organizations).

2) Each year's Community Board is to elect only one-third of the Board of Trustees. If vacancies occur, the rest of their terms are to be served by replacements chosen by the remaining Trustees (who represent several years' voters), not by the current year's Community Board.

These provisions are designed to ensure that each Community Board is broadly representative and is not dominated by a narrow set of interests. Note that these provisions do not prevent a change in the direction, philosophy, or leadership of the station. They simply require that any such change be based on support from many membership sectors and on more than one annual election.

=== Acquiring the frequency ===
In the summer of 1986, engineer Bob duTreil completed an engineering study for the broadcast license application, for which the fledgling station agreed to pay $2,500, the first of a number of debts incurred by the organization. An application dated July 4, 1986, was submitted to the FCC. That was rejected August 5, 1987; an additional $1,500 of engineering work was required to comply with FAA requirements, and the proposed tower height was lowered to 98 feet. There were also special requirements because of a non-interference treaty between the US and Mexico, although the tower site was more than 200 miles from the Mexican border.

On May 4, 1988, the Co-op Radio checking account was frozen for 90 days, for inability to pay the $7.50 monthly fee. They still owed more than $2,000 on their engineering study. On the same day, the University of Texas student newspaper, the Daily Texan, reported that the student assembly had approved $10,000 for a frequency search. On May 11, well known community radio lawyer John Crigler of the Washington firm Haley, Bader & Potts filed a motion to dismiss and replace Co-op's original application, and on June 1, the FCC stated that Co-op's (amended) application would be processed "in an expedited manner."

On July 25, 1988, the FCC's window for noncommercial license applications for the frequency closed. Two business days before that, The University of Texas filed a competing application, to be used for a student station The FCC awarded the license to KOOP, and the University appealed. In 1995, the FCC stopped using comparative hearings for deciding which applicant for a noncommercial educational radio frequency would win.

In the summer of 1992, the FCC ordered the two applicants to share the frequency. Both applicants rejected the regulator's plan that the stations should use the frequency on alternating days. By February 1993, they had negotiated the current time-sharing arrangement. KOOP also agreed to lease tower space from University station for $10,000 a year, for up to five years. Because the two stations were sharing the frequency, neither was eligible for a noncommercial radio equipment grant from the US Department of Commerce.

== Fires ==
In early 2006, KOOP's 304 E. Fifth Street studio was hit by two fires. On January 6 a fire caused significant smoke damage; the station suspended operation for just five days and sought a new home. Before a site could be found, a second fire occurred on February 4 which destroyed KOOP's building and three adjacent structures that housed artist studios and a nightclub. Both fires were declared accidental. The first was blamed on careless smoking by a neighbor; the second, on the nightclub's faulty heating and air conditioning unit.

The February fire knocked KOOP off the air for 17 days, during which time KVRX covered its sister station's hours, as it had following the original fire. KOOP resumed broadcasting on February 21 from studios at the city's classical music station KMFA. By the end of 2006, KOOP had found new quarters at 3823 Airport Boulevard, where it built two broadcast studios, two production rooms, a music library, meeting space and offices. The station began broadcasting from the facility on December 9, 2006.

KOOP had been broadcasting from its new home for less than 13 months when it suffered yet another blaze. On January 5, 2008, a fire swept through the Airport Boulevard studios, causing an estimated $300,000 damage. Austin fire officials declared the incident arson and within weeks charged a former station volunteer, Paul Webster Feinstein, with setting the blaze. According to investigators, Feinstein had quit a month earlier following a dispute over the music lineup for the station's overnight webstream. On June 12, 2009, Feinstein pleaded guilty to setting the 2008 fire, and was sentenced to ten years imprisonment; however, as part of a plea agreement, Feinstein would serve 120 days at the Texas State Prison in Huntsville, pay $134,000 restitution, serve 10 years probation upon release from prison, plus community service, and undergo counseling.

The station was back on the air within a few weeks, using studio space donated by Entercom Austin, which owns three of the city's commercial stations. KOOP returned to its Airport Boulevard studio in September 2008.

== See also ==
- List of community radio stations in the United States
