= The Daily Texan =

Student newspaper of the University of Texas at Austin

- The December 5, 2005 front page of The Daily Texan
- Type: Student newspaper
- Format: Broadsheet
- Owner: The University of Texas
- Publisher: Texas Student Media
- Editor-in-chief: Tiffany Lam
- Managing editor: Brian Murray
- News editor: Isaiah Williams
- Founded: 1900
- Headquarters: 2504 Whitis Avenue
- City: Austin, Texas
- Country: United States
- ISSN: 1090-1108
- OCLC number: 12033646
- Website: thedailytexan.com

The Daily Texan is the student newspaper of the University of Texas at Austin. It is one of the largest college newspapers in the United States, with a daily circulation of roughly 12,000 during the fall and spring semesters, and is among the oldest student newspapers in the South.

The Texan is entirely student-run and independent from the university, although its operations are overseen by Texas Student Media, an entity with faculty, student, and newspaper industry representatives.

== History ==
The Texan's origins date back to October 1900, with the merger of two privately owned weekly newspapers, The Ranger (est. 1897) (which had succeeded The Alcalde, which published from 1895–1897) and The Ranger and the Calendar (1889–1900). In 1902 The Texan was taken over by the Student Association. From 1900–1907, the newspaper came out weekly; and from 1907–1913 The Texan was published semiweekly. In 1913, the student body voted to publish the paper each weekday, and The Daily Texan was born on September 24, 1913.

In 2008 The Daily Texan was one of three student newspapers that owned and operated its own printing press. Originally acquired in 1973 for $222,000 (equivalent to $1,610,000 in 2025), the press was put on the market in 2009. In May 2009, the Austin American-Statesman began printing The Daily Texan. As of October 2019, New Braunfels Herald-Zeitung prints and distributes the papers.

== Staff ==
Historically, the position of editor of The Daily Texan has been elected. The logic of an elected editor-in-chief historically has been based on the newspaper’s having been founded and owned by students and then given over to the student body. More recently, it has been argued that because students were compelled to fund the paper through the payment of mandatory student service fees, they should have some say in the paper’s overall direction. In addition, the elected editor-in-chief has been seen as a way to protect the paper from institutional censorship from the university. Since the student body selects the editor of the paper, this ensures that the university administration cannot install an editor-in-chief sympathetic to its views and thereby control the content of the newspaper.

In modern times, editorial candidates have been screened by the Texas Student Publications Board (now known as Texas Student Media), an entity with faculty, student, and newspaper industry representatives. The TSM Board publishes a handbook which sets forth the requirements an editorial candidate must meet before his or her name may be placed on the ballot. The board has been resistant to the idea of an elected editor and has made several attempts to convert the position to an appointed one. The most recent attempt, led by the board president, was in 2005.

The TSM Board currently appoints the managing editor, who oversees the daily operation of the paper, including all departments other than opinion. The editor-in-chief, who is elected, has sole oversight of the editorial page and opinion department.

== Awards ==
The Texan has won multiple awards, including the Associated Collegiate Press’ "Pacemaker Award" in 1965, 1969, 1971 and 1985, and the Columbia Scholastic Press’ Gold Crown Award in 1984, 1985, 1989, 1990, 1991, 1993, 1994, 1995, 1997, 2005 and 2006. Most recently the Texan won TAPME’s Daily Newspaper of the Year Award for 2016.

== Notable staff alumni ==
- Demi Adejuyigbe
- Nick Barbaro
- Bill Barminski
- Lisa Beyer
- Berke Breathed
- Walter Cronkite
- Henry Gayden
- Mike Godwin
- Karen Elliott House
- Deborah Howell
- Lady Bird Johnson
- Fritz Lanham
- Dan Malone
- Mark McKinnon
- Willie Morris
- Bill Moyers
- John Patric
- Larry C. Price
- Robert Rodriguez
- Liz Smith
- Karen Tumulty
- Siva Vaidhyanathan
- Rob Walker
- Al Ward
- Chris Ware
- Robert Wilonsky

A number of cartoonists who began at the Texan have gone on to attain commercial success. The most notable of these are Chris Ware, creator of Jimmy Corrigan, the Smartest Kid on Earth; Berkeley Breathed, creator of Academia Waltz, the predecessor to Bloom County; and Robert Rodriguez, director of Sin City. Hepcats, by Martin Wagner, and Eyebeam, by Sam Hurt, also found continued success after their creators left the University of Texas at Austin. A number of Texan cartoonists later worked in animation, among them Divya Srinivasan, the author of Little Owl’s Night and other children’s picture books.

== See also ==
- List of college and university student newspapers in the United States
