= Texas Student Media =

American student media operation

- Formerly: Texas Student Publications, Inc.
- Industry: Publishing, Broadcast media
- Founded: 1921
- Headquarters: Austin, Texas
- Products: Newspapers, Magazines, Radio stations, Television stations
- Operating income: $2.3 million
- Parent: University of Texas at Austin
- Website: texasstudentmedia.com

Texas Student Media (TSM) is an auxiliary enterprise of the University of Texas at Austin (UT) and the largest student media operation in the United States, serving more than 53,000 students and 20,000 employees. Each year, more than 1,500 students and 15 professional staff members contribute to TSM.

In the late 2000s and early 2010s, TSM was under severe financial constraints, and in 2015, funding of up to $250,000 a year was allocated to cover anticipated deficits. Since then, TSM has been in much stronger financial shape. For the first half of fiscal year 2024–25, TSM reported a net income of $273,848 and total equity amounting to more than $2 million.

== History ==
UT's first publication was the Cactus Yearbook, established in 1894; followed in 1900 by the weekly Texan (which evolved into The Daily Texan in 1913). In 1902, the Student Association was formed, partly to oversee UT student publications. In 1921, as more publications emerged, Texas Student Publications, Inc. (TSP) was formed. Over the years the organization oversaw a number of UT publications:

- On Campus
- The Coyote (1908 – 1915) — humor magazine banned by the Student Association
- Longhorn Magazine (1915 – 1929) — literary journal merged with The Texas Ranger
- The Scalper (Oct. 1919 – Nov. 1922) — humor magazine banned by the TSP for its perceived "immorality"
- The Texas Ranger (Oct. 1923 – Jan. 1972) — humor magazine; a number of staffers (from the period 1959–1965) later went on to become key members of the underground comix scene
- The Peregrinus (1949 – 2004) — University of Texas School of Law yearbook (named after Praetor Peregrinus, the patron saint of law students); first published by the Society of Peregrinus and taken over by TSP in 1970
- The Riata: The Student Literary Magazine of the University of Texas (Spring 1961 – Spring 1971)
- Texas Engineering and Science Magazine (1965 – Jan. 1972)
- The Pearl (Fall 1972 – Apr. 1977) — successor to The Texas Ranger; monthly supplement to The Daily Texan that changed its name to The Maverick in its final year
- Texas Law Forum
- Texas Times; OCLC 9104814
- UTMost (Fall 1978 – 1992) — the sixth UT magazine

The Texas Ranger, The Riata, and Texas Engineering and Science Magazine were all cancelled in January 1972 by the TSP Board because they were being published with more liabilities than assets.

In 2002, reflecting its increasing engagement with broadcast media, the organization changed its name to Texas Student Media.

== Media properties ==
The Daily Texan is the most significant of TSM's properties. With a daily print circulation of 14,600 copies and an online presence that reaches an average of 10,600 visitors per day, The Daily Texan is the centerpiece of what has become a $2.3 million multimedia operation.

The following is a comprehensive list of Texas Student Media properties:

- The Daily Texan, the most award-winning college newspaper in the United States, established in a previous form in 1900
  - DT Weekend, The Daily Texan's weekly entertainment resource
  - Longhorn Living, the first student-created housing and apartment search engine for all University of Texas students
- The Texas Travesty, the college humor publication with the largest circulation in the United States; originally independent but absorbed by TSP/TSM in 1998
- Texas Student Television, one of few FCC-licensed Student television station in the United States; first went on air in 1987
- Cactus Yearbook, the school's yearbook, established in 1894
- KVRX-FM, one of the few completely student-run college radio stations in the United States
- Vector Magazine, a monthly publication within the Cockrell School of Engineering
- BurntX
- Texas Connect
- Bevo Video Productions

== Board of Operating Trustees ==
A joint student-faculty Board of Operating Trustees sets policy and oversees the operation of student media on behalf of the University of Texas System Board of Regents. The Board also appoints the Director of Student Media, who oversees the daily business functions of TSM. The Director serves renewable annual terms. The Board of Operating Trustees is composed of three faculty members appointed to two year terms by the UT President, two outside media professionals appointed to two year terms by the UT President, and six students elected by the general student body to two year terms.

=== Board presidents ===
- Natasha Solce (2000–2001)
- Craig Daniel (2001–2002)
- Michael M. Hoffman (2002–2003)
- Coleman Lewis (2003–2004)
- Cale McDowell (2004–2005)
- Camden Gilman (2005–2006)
- A.J. Bauer (2006–2007)
- Zachary Warmbrodt (2007–2008)
- Benjamin Trotter (2008–2009)
- Nicole Juneau (2009–2010)
- Brennan Lawler (2010–2011)

=== Board Vice Presidents ===
- Michael Hoffman (2001–2002)
- Jonathan Lee (2002–2004)
- Brandon Chicotsky (2006–2007)
- Nicole Juneau (2008–2009)
- Mary Dunn (2009–2011)
