= K32OJ-D =

Television station in Austin, Texas

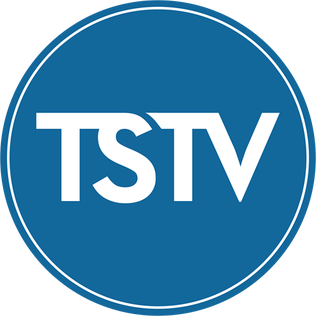
- Austin, Texas; United States
- Channels: Digital: 32 (UHF); Virtual: 32
- Branding: TSTV

Programming
- Affiliations: 32.1: Independent; 32.2: KVRX audio; 32.3: Infomercials

Ownership
- Owner: University of Texas at Austin

History
- Founded: February 3, 1995
- Former call signs: K09VR (1995–2010); K29HW-D (2010–2022)
- Former channel numbers: Analog: 9 (VHF, 1995–2010); Digital: 29 (UHF, 2010–2022)

Technical information
- Licensing authority: FCC
- Facility ID: 167743
- Class: LD
- ERP: 7.5 kW
- HAAT: 87.1 m (286 ft)
- Transmitter coordinates: 30°17′11.1″N 97°44′21.8″W

Links
- Public license information: LMS
- Website: watchtstv.com

K32OJ-D (channel 32), branded Texas Student Television (TSTV), is a low-power independent television station in Austin, Texas, United States. Owned by the University of Texas at Austin, it is one of only a handful of FCC-licensed television stations in the country run entirely by students.

On cable, the station can be found on channel 15 via the campus cable system that serves the university. TSTV also offers a streaming service.

== History ==
The station went on the air on February 3, 1995, as K09VR (branded as "KVR9") on channel 9. KVR initially broadcast music videos from MuchMusic and local programs around the area.

In January 2010, TSTV began broadcasting digitally on UHF channel 29 under a new call sign, K29HW-D. A campaign was held to raise the $85,000 needed to convert the station to digital. As a low-power station, K09VR was not required to meet the June 12, 2009, deadline to convert. Its license for analog channel 9 (K09VR) was later cancelled. In June 2011, TSTV increased transmitter power to 3,400 watts, enhancing its coverage across Austin, and to an estimated 75,000 households who watch television via antenna.

TSTV moved from UHF channel 29 to UHF channel 32 in July 2022, with a power increase to 7.5 kilowatts, and changed its call sign to K32OJ-D.

== Programming ==
TSTV's content ranges consists of student-produced scripted comedy shows, news (entertainment and sports), and musical variety shows. Sports shows include College Pressbox, which informs viewers on all news related to Texas Athletics; College Crossfire, which provides sports debate on all the hot issues around sports; The 1-0 Sports Show, a morning podcast show which provides insights on sports around the nation; Texas Countdown, a pregame show more major UT athletic events; and TSTV Gameday, which provides play-by-play for UT club sports. In addition to their shows, the sports department provides live tweeting coverage of many UT sporting events.

== Celebrity connections ==
Notable celebrities who have appeared on several of the station's shows or segments include Pauly Shore, Mark Cuban, Dennis Quaid, and Robert Rodriguez.

Writer, producer and director Wes Anderson was briefly affiliated with the station while he was a student at the university. There he met future collaborator Owen Wilson. Zach Anner, Internet star and host of the OWN show Rollin' with Zach Anner worked at the station, starring and producing such shows like That's Awesome! and The Wingmen. Creator of Red vs. Blue and Rooster Teeth Productions, Burnie Burns worked at the station in the early nineties and created their longest running show, Sneak Peek.

Todd Berger, writer and director of the films The Scenesters and It's a Disaster, worked at the station in the late 1990s, and wrote and directed Campus Loop.

== Subchannels ==
The station's signal is multiplexed:

Subchannels of K32OJ-D
Subchannel	Res.	Short name	Programming
32.1	720p	K32OJ-D	Main K32OJ-D programming
32.2	480i	K32OJ-D	KVRX audio (4:3)
32.3	480i	K32OJ-D	Infomercials (4:3)
