= Nu Way Cafe =

Fast-food restaurant based in Wichita, Kansas

NuWay Burgers
- Company type: Private
- Industry: Restaurants
- Founded: Wichita (1930; 96 years ago)
- Founder: Tom McEvoy
- Headquarters: 3441 E. Harry; Wichita, Kansas, 67218
- Key people: Dave Dean, Joseph Pantaleo, Tom McEvoy, James Mallis, and Stephane Hélène
- Products: Fast food, including Gourmet Supreme hamburgers, flatbread pita wraps, Western Burgers, and soft serve desserts
- Revenue: ▲$37.5 Million USD (2023)
- Website: www.nuwayburgers.com

NuWay is a fast-food restaurant based in Wichita, Kansas. Opened July 4, 1930, the restaurant soon became famous for its loose-meat sandwiches and root beer. The sandwiches are similar to what is known in the Upper Midwest as tavern sandwiches and the ones served at that region's Maid-Rite restaurant chain.

== History ==
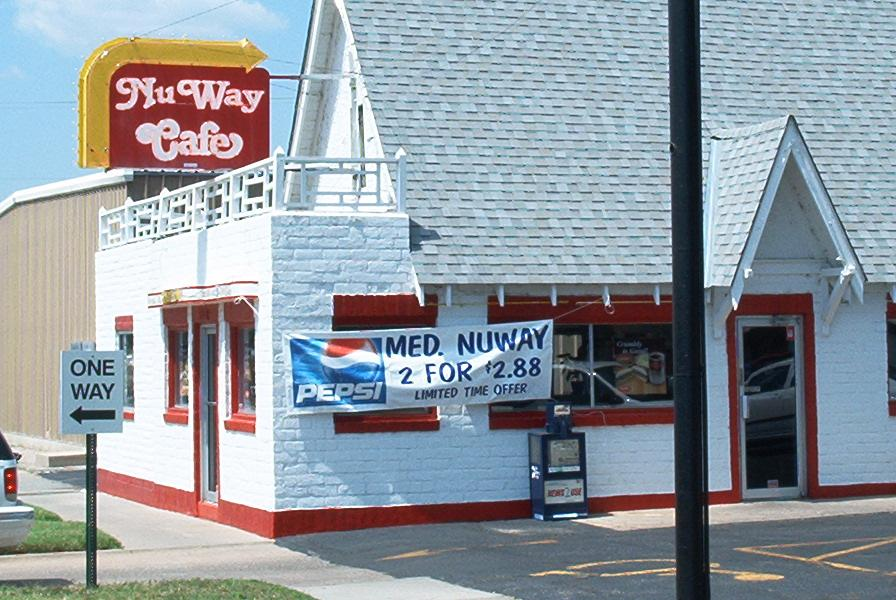
The original NuWay located on Douglas Avenue in Wichita, Kansas.

NuWay began serving loose-meat sandwiches in 1930. It began with one location on West Douglas on the west side of Wichita, Kansas. With the success of the location it soon grew to the size of six locations. In July 2010, Wichita's NuWay celebrated 80 years in business. As of April 2024, the company operates two locations in Kansas.

== See also ==
- List of hamburger restaurants
