= Canteen Lunch in the Alley =

Coordinates: 41.018091°N 92.411947°W

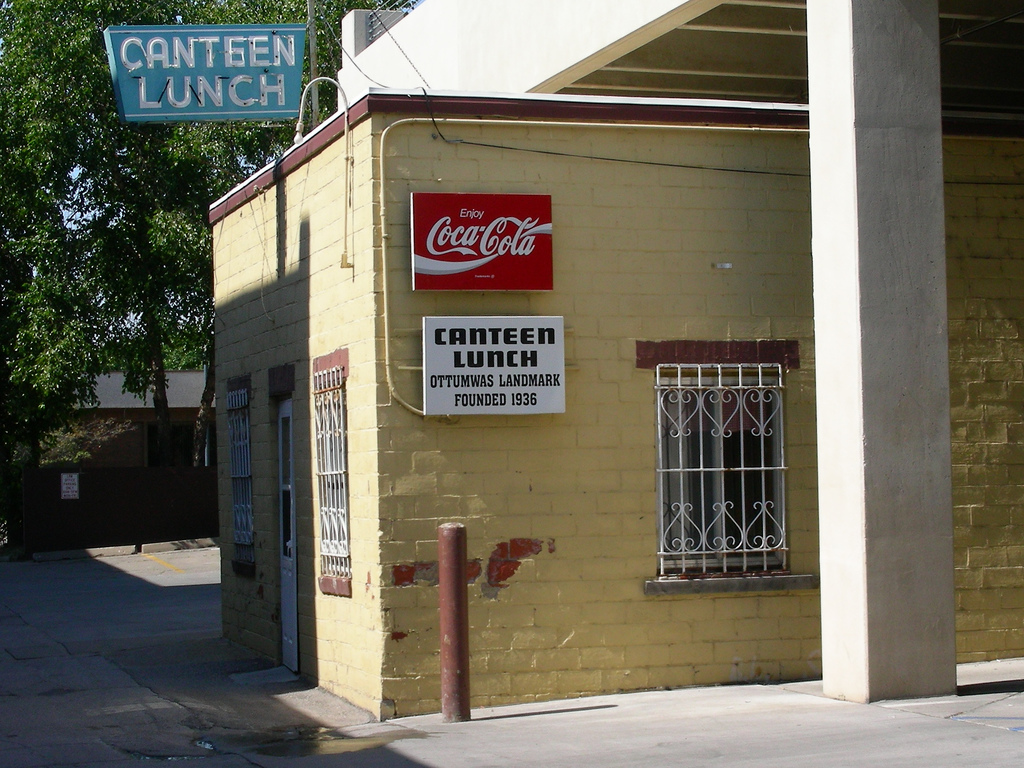
- Interactive map of Canteen Lunch in the Alley

Restaurant information
- Established: 1927
- Food type: Canteen lunch
- Location: 112 East 2nd Street, Ottumwa, Iowa, United States
- Seating capacity: 16

Canteen Lunch in the Alley is a short order restaurant in Ottumwa, Iowa. The original five-stool Canteen Lunch was opened in 1927, and moved west on the same street to its current address under the second street parking ramp in 1936. It is known for its loose-meat sandwiches (originally called "scrambled hamburgers" in Iowa) and homemade pies.

The restaurant's loose-meat sandwich ("Canteen" locally) resembles that of a “Maid-Rite” or “Sloppy Joe” with different seasoning and condiments like pickles, ketchup and mustard. On a typical day, the lunchroom prepares 150 lbs with a finer grind than standard ground beef.

Canteen Lunch in the Alley contains a horseshoe-shaped counter-top surrounded by 16 stools, typical of early to mid-20th-century lunchrooms that gained popularity in the Great Depression. The Canteen was the model for the Lanford Lunch Box restaurant opened by Roseanne Conner (played by Roseanne Barr) in the sitcom Roseanne. Barr was married to actor Tom Arnold, a native of Ottumwa, and they frequently visited Ottumwa during their marriage.

In 2000, the City of Ottumwa pursued the construction of a downtown parking ramp in the current location of the canteen, offering to purchase the building or pay for its relocation. After these were rejected, in 2004 air rights were purchased above the canteen and a parking ramp was constructed overhead. In late 2015, Scott and Janice Pierce bought the restaurant.

== See also ==
- Maid-Rite Sandwich Shop (Springfield, Illinois)
- Tavern sandwich
