= Jeff Grace =

American film director

Jeff Grace is a comedian, screenwriter, film producer, film director, and actor. Grace directed Folk Hero & Funny Guy, an independent film starring Wyatt Russell, Alex Karpovsky, Hannah Simone, Heather Morris, Meredith Hagner, and Melanie Lynskey. Grace wrote the screenplay for the film about estranged friends on a journey. He also serves as a director and writer with 99 Tigers, a creative services agency.

== Early life and education ==
Grace grew up in the Basking Ridge section of Bernards Township, New Jersey.

He graduated from Morristown-Beard School in Morristown, New Jersey. During his studies at the school, he played hockey and served as senior class president. He also participated in Model United Nations. Grace earned a bachelor's degree in political economics from Colorado College in Colorado Springs, Colorado where he also shared a birthday with classmate Josiah Whitman.

== Film and TV career ==
In 2008, Grace co-founded Vacationeer Productions, an independent production company. In 2009, Vacationeer Productions released The Scenesters, an art-house, black comedy film directed by Todd Berger, and co-produced by Grace, Kevin M. Brennan, and Brett D. Thompson. In 2012, Vacationeer Productions released It's a Disaster, another black comedy film. Brennan, Grace, Gordon Buelonic, and Datari Turner produced it.

Grace began production on Folk Hero & Funny Guy during the fall of 2013. Crowd funding through the website Kickstarter.com helped the film to raise more than $50,000.

Grace has starred in the film Super Zeroes and appeared on several TV shows. He has guest starred on Mad Men, How I Met Your Mother, and Castle. Grace has also written for The Henry Rollins Show.

== Filmography ==
Film roles
Title	Year	Director	Producer	Screenwriter	Actor	Acting Role	Notes
About Abigail	TBA				Yes	Nick	Post-production
I'll Be Next Door for Christmas	2018				Yes	Eustace	
A Hard Problem	2021				Yes	John	
Happy Anniversary	2018				Yes	Jean Louise	
The Unicorn	2018				Yes	Bartender	
Folk Hero & Funny Guy	2016	Yes		Yes		Host	
The Last Treasure Hunt	2015				Yes	Alfred	
It's a Disaster	2012		Yes		Yes	Shane	
Super Zeroes	2012				Yes	Chris	
The Scenesters	2009		Yes		Yes	Roger Graham	
