= Tavern sandwich =

Ground beef sandwich

Tavern Sandwich
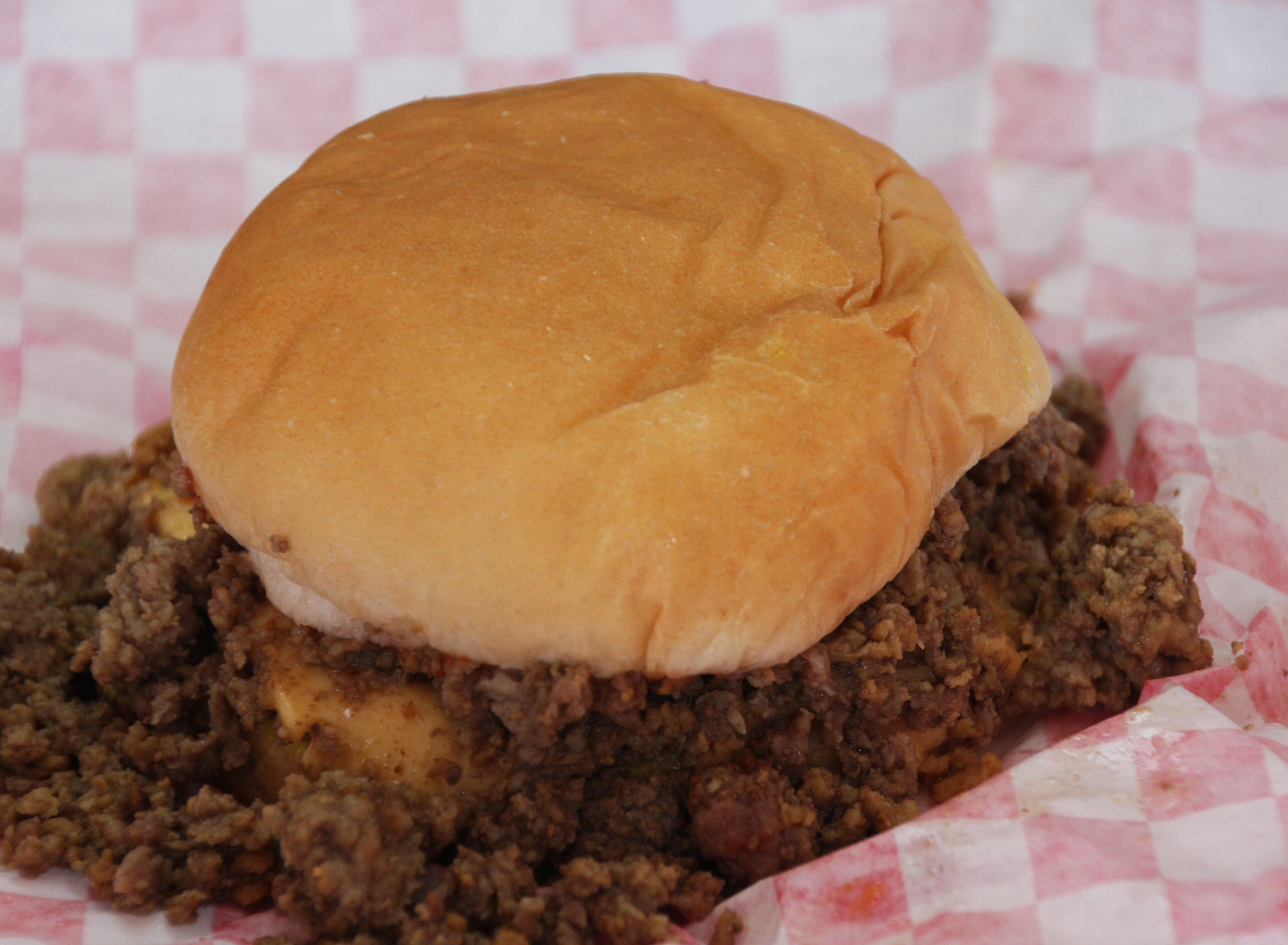
- A tavern sandwich with cheese
- Alternative names: Loosemeat
- Type: Sandwich
- Course: Main
- Place of origin: United States
- Region or state: Midwestern United States
- Serving temperature: 33C / 91F
- Main ingredients: Bun, ground beef, onions

A tavern sandwich (also called a loose meat sandwich or loosemeat) is a sandwich consisting of ground beef on a bun, sometimes mixed with sauteed onions, and sometimes topped with pickles, ketchup, mustard, raw onions, and/or cheese.

Unlike a hamburger, a tavern's meat is cooked loose rather than formed into a compact patty. It more closely resembles a sloppy joe, without the tomato-based sauce.

== History ==
Carroll Dietz of Missoula, Montana, created the precursor to the tavern sandwich in 1920, referred to as a "steamed hamburger." In 1926, Fred Angell began selling his version of the sandwich at the first Maid-Rite restaurant in Muscatine, Iowa, under the name "loose meat sandwich." The name "tavern" for the sandwich is credited to David Heglin. Heglin sold the sandwiches at his Sioux City, Iowa, restaurant in 1924. After Heglin died, Abe Kaled bought the business in 1934 and renamed the restaurant Ye Olde Tavern after the sandwich. Kaled perfected the recipe for the ground beef, and the tavern sandwich spread to restaurants and bars across the Sioux City area.

The sandwich is now well known throughout the Midwestern United States, and is served not only in small, local establishments but also in franchise restaurant locations such as Dairy Queen and Maid-Rite. The Wichita, Kansas-based chain Nu Way Cafe serves a version of the tavern/loose meat sandwich called a "Nu Way". In Illinois, the sandwich is also known as a "loose hamburger sandwich". In Iowa, it is sometimes referred to as a Maid-Rite. In Kansas City, Missouri, the locally owned restaurant, In-A-Tub, founded in 1955, calls its tavern/loose meat sandwich a pocketburger.

== Cultural references ==
In later seasons of the American sitcom Roseanne, Roseanne Conner (Roseanne Barr) co-owns a restaurant called the "Lanford Lunch Box" in the fictional town of Lanford, Illinois, which specializes in loose meat sandwiches. The inspiration for Lunch Box was a real-life restaurant called Canteen Lunch in the Alley in Ottumwa, Iowa. In 1993, Roseanne and then-husband Tom Arnold opened Roseanne and Tom's Big Food Diner (based on the fictional Lanford Lunchbox) in Eldon, Iowa (less than 20 miles southeast of Ottumwa's Canteen Lunch), also specializing in loose meat sandwiches.

Iowa's loose meat sandwich figures in the episode "Iowa" of The Good Wife, in which a presidential candidate completing the full Grassley is forced to eat a loose meat sandwich at each stop.

== See also ==
- List of American sandwiches
- List of beef dishes
- List of sandwiches

== Bibliography ==
- Dondanville, Ruth (2003). Nobody cooks like Ruth : menus from Cherotree. Haverford, PA: Infinity Publishing.com. ISBN 0-7414-1418-X. OCLC 56429804.
- Mariani, John F. (1999). The encyclopedia of American food & drink. New York: Lebhar-Friedman Books. ISBN 0-86730-784-6. OCLC 41319951.
- Metcalf, Allan A. (2000). How we talk : American regional English today. Boston: Houghton Mifflin. ISBN 0-618-04363-2. OCLC 44683508.
- Peterson, Eric (2006). Ramble : a field guide to the U.S.A. Denver [Colo.]: Speck Press. ISBN 1-933108-08-8. OCLC 63807683.
- Smith, Vernon L. (2008). Discovery-a memoir. Bloomington, IN: AuthorHouse. ISBN 978-1-4343-8430-0. OCLC 326874412.
