= Tom Arnold (actor) =

American actor and comedian (born 1959)

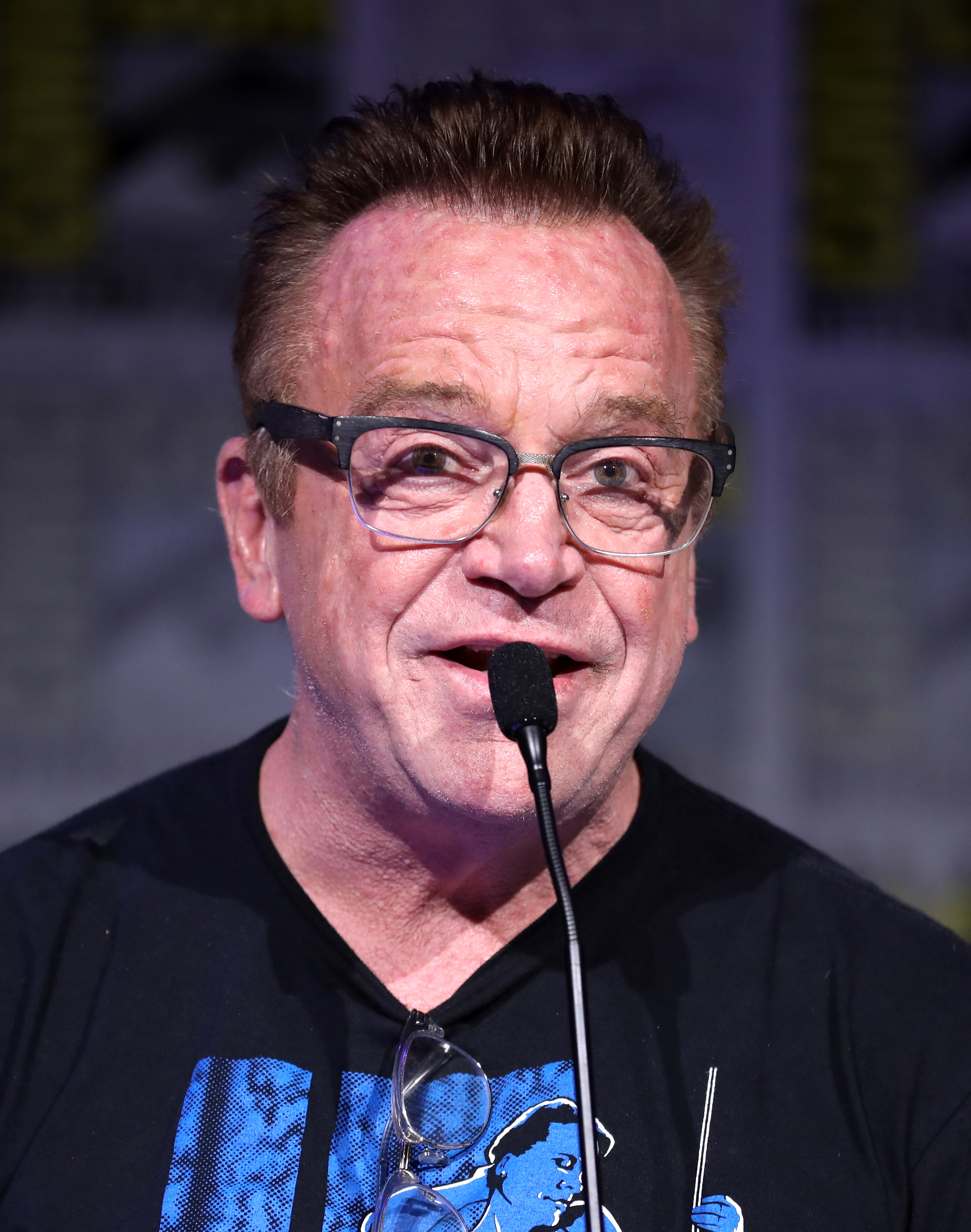
- Arnold in 2023
- Born: Thomas Duane Arnold; March 6, 1959 (age 67); Ottumwa, Iowa, U.S.
- Occupations: Actor; comedian; television host
- Years active: 1981–present
- Spouses: Roseanne Barr (m. 1990; div. 1994) Julie Lynn Champnella (m. 1995; div. 1999) Shelby Roos (m. 2002; div. 2008) Ashley Groussman (m. 2009; div. 2020)
- Children: 2

Thomas Duane Arnold (born March 6, 1959) is an American actor and comedian. He is best known for playing Arnie Thomas on Roseanne, which starred his ex-wife Roseanne Barr.

He has appeared in several films, including True Lies (1994), Nine Months (1995), Big Bully, Carpool, The Stupids (all 1996), McHale's Navy (1997), Animal Factory (2000), Cradle 2 the Grave (2003), Mr. 3000 (2004), Happy Endings (2005), Pride (2007), The Great Buck Howard (2008), and Madea's Witness Protection (2012). He was also the host of The Best Damn Sports Show Period for four years, and appeared on Sons of Anarchy.

== Early life ==
Arnold was born in Ottumwa, Iowa, the son of Linda Kay (née Graham) and Jack Arnold. His mother was Jewish. He had 2 siblings: a sister Lori and a brother Scott. As a child, Arnold was diagnosed with autism. His mother abandoned the family when he was a child, and he and his siblings were raised by their father:

The three were still very young when their mother, who Tom Arnold said was an alcoholic, moved out. That left them in the care of a father in his early 20s whose role as breadwinner left him little time for parenting, Arnold said.

In their teens, Arnold and his sister moved back in with their mother. With her mother's consent, Lori was married at age 14 to a man who was 23 years old. Soon Lori was a heavy drug user and dealer running one of the largest meth operations in the Midwest until her arrest in 1989.

Arnold escaped his sister's fate, and worked at a meatpacking plant. He attended Ottumwa High School, Indian Hills Community College, and from 1981 to 1983, the University of Iowa, where he studied business administration and writing.

== Career ==
In the early 1980s, Arnold had a prop-based comedy routine called "Tom Arnold and the Goldfish Review." Roseanne Barr brought him in as a writer for her television sitcom, Roseanne. He married her in 1990, after she divorced her first husband. Arnold wrote himself into the show as the character "Arnie Thomas". The couple's marriage attracted media and especially tabloid attention due to their sometimes outrageous behavior. In 1992, Arnold starred in his own sitcom, The Jackie Thomas Show. Airing after Roseanne on ABC, the show lasted 18 episodes.

In 1993, Arnold and Barr bought a house together in the town of Eldon, Iowa and opened a restaurant, 'Roseanne and Tom's Big Food Diner' nearby. The diner served loosemeat sandwiches similar to the specialty of the fictional Lanford Lunch Box on Roseanne, which in turn was based on the real-life Canteen Lunch in the Alley in Ottumwa. Both appeared in the 1993 movie The Woman Who Loved Elvis, filmed in Ottumwa. In 1994, Arnold appeared as the sidekick to Arnold Schwarzenegger's character in James Cameron's action blockbuster film True Lies. Arnold and Barr divorced in 1994 due to irreconcilable differences. Their restaurant closed in 1995.

After Arnold's divorce from Barr, he narrated and starred in several Craftmatic Adjustable Bed commercials that aired throughout 1995. The last commercial that he filmed culminated in Arnold lying in a bed that caught on fire and melted a strand of his underarm hair during the taping; the footage was never released. Arnold commented on Twitter in 2014: "Me and Mike (he was one of my best friends) used to laugh about how [I] had a Pepsi commercial of my own".

In November 2000, Arnold played the role of Al Raymond in the second-season Baywatch Hawaii episode, "The Cage".

In a late 1990s interview on radio's The Howard Stern Show, Arnold admitted that his share of his and Barr's estate amounted to "over $20,000,000", including a percentage of the Roseanne ABC-TV series, but would not elaborate, citing a confidentiality clause. From 2001 through 2005, he was one of the hosts of The Best Damn Sports Show Period. From 2003 to 2005, Arnold was the voice of Arby's "Oven Mitt" commercials.

Arnold had his first romantic leading man part in the 2005 movie Happy Endings. That same year, Arnold starred in The Kid & I. From 2008 to 2011, he hosted the CMT show My Big Redneck Wedding. He hosted CMT's The Biggest Redneck Wedding Ever in 2008, in which he served as the wedding planner, created a wedding that exceeded the dreams of a couple who wanted to be married in a mud bog, and performed the actual ceremony. CMT also made three series of "My Big Redneck Vacation" presented by Arnold and featuring the Clampet Family from Shreveport, Louisiana.

Arnold's role as a child molester in Gardens of the Night sparked revelations that he had been a victim of sexual abuse in his childhood. He decided to take on the role to shed more light on the issue.

In January 2017, Tom Arnold was revealed as a celebrity contestant on the Australian edition of I'm A Celebrity...Get Me Out of Here!. He was the first evictee from the jungle, after 17 days, and stated he was paid between $US600,000 and $US700,000 for his participation in the program. In June 2017, Arnold filed a lawsuit against companies Network Ten and 'A List Entertainment' for defrauding him for being on I'm a Celebrity...Get Me Out of Here!. Arnold claims that he was promised a payment of $425,000 and a comedy tour in Australia. However, he was missing $140,000 in payment and Network Ten backed out of the comedy tour.

In 2018, Arnold's Viceland show The Hunt for the Trump Tapes premiered to low ratings and mainly negative reviews. The show was canceled after one season.

== Personal life ==
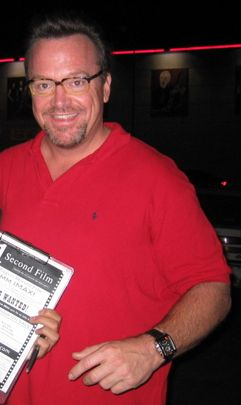
Arnold in 2004 producing The 1 Second Film

Arnold met comedian Roseanne Barr when she saw his act in 1983. Their relationship was complicated by his alcoholism and drug addiction, but eventually he became sober. The two married in 1990 and divorced in 1994. When he divorced Barr, he did not take any alimony. During the next ten years, Arnold married two subsequent times. Both marriages ended in divorce. In August 2008, Arnold broke his scapula in a motorcycle accident on the Pacific Coast Highway.

Over Thanksgiving weekend 2009, Arnold married his fourth wife, Ashley Groussman, in Maui before 75 guests. Dax Shepard served as Arnold's best man. He appeared December 10, 2009 on the late night talk show Asia Uncut. The couple have two children and four dogs. The divorce was finalized in July 2020.

Arnold was raised a Methodist. Some sources say he converted to Judaism upon marrying Roseanne Barr in 1990, but Arnold discovered he was of Jewish descent through his mother and did not need to convert in order to become a practicing Jew. He still practices Judaism and met his fourth wife at a Passover event.

Arnold has given much of his time to charities including giving out toys during the holidays to those in need through the Miracle on 1st Street Toy Giveaway, an annual tradition of his.

=== Politics ===
Arnold is a gun owner and a supporter of the Second Amendment. However, he expressed support for universal background checks and has said some people should not be allowed to own guns such as people who are on the terrorist watch lists, domestic abusers, and violent felons.

Arnold is a critic of Donald Trump and has accused him of being a racist. He also starred in a show called The Hunt for the Trump Tapes in which Arnold searches for damaging information on Trump. In 2019, Arnold tape-recorded a phone call with Trump's lawyer Michael Cohen where Cohen divulged his involvement in the cover-up of a scandal involving Jerry Falwell Jr., his wife, and a pool boy.

=== Family reunion ===
On October 8, 2020, Tom Arnold, his brother Scottie, and sister Lori reunited for the first time in 28 years, back together again in their hometown of Ottumwa, Iowa. During this time, Lori was filming a 3-part docu-series called Queen of Meth, which her brother Tom helped to produce. It recounts her time as the "queen-pin" of a huge drug business that she ran from Iowa to California. Queen of Meth was originally released on Discovery+ in May 2021.

== Filmography ==
=== Film ===
Year	Title	Role	Notes
1991	Freddy's Dead: The Final Nightmare	Childless Man	
1991	Backfield in Motion	Howard Peterman	
1992	Hero	Chick	
1993	The Woman Who Loved Elvis	Jack Jackson	Television film
1993	Coneheads	Golfer	Uncredited
1993	Body Bags	Morgue Worker No. 1	Television film
1993	Undercover Blues	Vern Newman	
1994	True Lies	Albert "Gib" Gibson	
1995	Nine Months	Marty Dwyer	
1996	Big Bully	Roscoe "Fang" Bigger	
1996	Carpool	Franklin Laszlo	
1996	The Stupids	Stanley Stupid	
1997	Touch	August Murray	
1997	McHale's Navy	Lt. Commander Quinton McHale, Jr.	
1997	Austin Powers: International Man of Mystery	Texan	Uncredited
1997	Hacks	Danny	
1998	National Lampoon's Golf Punks	Al Oliver	
1998	Buster & Chauncey's Silent Night	Fritz (voice)	Direct-to-video
1999	Jackie's Back	Martin Pritz	Television film
1999	Dancing Outlaw II: Jesco Goes to Hollywood	Himself	Documentary
2000	Bar Hopping	Eddie	
2000	Animal Factory	Buck Rowan	
2000	We Married Margo	Himself	Cameo
2000	Shriek If You Know What I Did Last Friday the Thirteenth	Doughy Primesuspect / Hardy (The Killer)	Direct-to-video
2000	Just Sue Me	Barbuto	
2000	Welcome to Hollywood	Himself	Cameo
2001	Exit Wounds	Henry Wayne	
2001	Lloyd	Tom	
2002	Hansel & Gretel	Boogeyman	
2002	Romantic Comedy 101	James Ford	Television film
2002	Children on Their Birthdays	Lionel Quince	
2003	Manhood	Dr. Levanthal	
2003	Cradle 2 the Grave	Archie	
2003	National Lampoon's Barely Legal	Mr. Lewis	
2003	Dickie Roberts: Former Child Star	Himself	Cameo
2003	Just for Kicks	Coach Martin	Direct-to-video
2004	Soul Plane	Elvis Hunkee	
2004	Mr. 3000	Himself	Cameo
2005	Happy Endings	Frank McKee	
2005	Kicking & Screaming	Himself	Cameo
2005	Rebound	Himself	Cameo
2005	The Kid & I	Bill Williams	Also producer and writer
2005	Chasing Christmas	Jack Cameron	Television film
2005	Three Wise Guys	Murray Crown	Television film
2007	Homo Erectus	Gay Caveman	
2007	Pride	Richard Binkowski	
2007	Game of Life	Richard	Originally known as Oranges
2007	Palo Alto	Morgan	
2007	The Final Season	Burt Akers	
2008	Gardens of the Night	Alex	
2008	Good Dick	Dad	
2008	This Is Not a Test	Himself	
2008	Remarkable Power	Van Hagen	
2008	Moonlight and Mistletoe	Nick Crosby	Television film
2008	Unstable Fables: The Goldilocks and 3 Bears Show	Mac Bear (voice)	Direct-to-DVD film
2009	The Skeptic	Sully	
2009	American Summer	Himself	
2009	April Showers	Martin Blackwell	
2009	The 1 Second Film	—N/a	Producer
2010	Group Sex	Herman	
2011	Walk a Mile in My Pradas	Joe	
2011	The Jerk Theory	Father Bailey	
2012	Fred 3: Camp Fred	Floyd Spunkmeyer	Television film
2012	Madea's Witness Protection	Walter	
2012	Hit and Run	U.S. Marshal Randy Anderson	
2012	Chilly Christmas	Quarterman	Direct-to-video
2013	Jewtopia	Bruce Daniels	
2013	Pulling Strings	Art	
2014	Dumbbells	Daddy	
2014	Shelby	Doug - the dog catcher	
2015	Jungle Shuffle	Coati King (voice)	
2015	Underdog Kids	Gene "Geno" Burman	
2015	Sex School	Principal Hyman	
2015	A Mouse Tale	Dalliwog the Wizard (voice)	
2015	I Am Chris Farley	Himself	
2015	The Curse of Downers Grove	Chuck's father	
2017	Dead Ant	Danny	
2017	Maximum Impact	Barnes	
2018	Bigger	Roy Hawkins	
2018	Saving Flora	Runyon	
2019	Christmas Scavenger Hunt	Carl	Hallmark Movie
2019	Pegasus: Pony With a Broken Wing	Daniel Warren	
2021	Hollywood.Con	El Jade	
2021	Christmas Thieves	Frank	
2021	Queen of Meth	Himself	
2021	High Holiday	Greg Corske	
2022	Good Mourning	Famous Director	
2023	Alien Storm	Mayor Harrison	
2023	Ape vs. Mecha Ape	Hamilton	A mockbuster film by The Asylum
2024	Dragpires	Bob	
2025	Airplane 2025	Senator Rufus	A mockbuster film by The Asylum
2025	Mermaid	Todd	A mockbuster film by The Asylum
2026	New Toy Story		A mockbuster film by The Asylum
TBA	The Gun on Second Street	Dick Steinberger	

=== Television ===
Year	Title	Role	Notes
1989–1993	Roseanne	Arnold Shemp "Arnie" Thomas	20 episodes
1992–1993	The Jackie Thomas Show	Jackie Thomas	18 episodes, co-producer
1993	The Larry Sanders Show	Himself	1 episodes
1994	Tom	Tom Graham	12 episodes
1994	General Hospital	Billy Boggs	9 episodes
1996	Brotherly Love	Jack	1 episode
1997–1998	The Tom Show	Tom Amross	19 episodes
1998	Space Ghost Coast to Coast	Himself	Episode: "Joshua"
1999	The Simpsons	Himself (voice)	Episode: "Treehouse of Horror X"
1999	The Norm Show	Andrew	Episode: "Gambling Man"
2000	Baywatch: Hawaii	Al Raymond	Episode: "The Cage"
2001	Weakest Link	Himself	
2001	The Fairly OddParents	Corporate Santa (voice)	Episode: "Christmas Every Day"
2001	The Outer Limits	Jerry Miller	Episode: "Family Values"
2003	King of the Hill	Norm Gladwell (voice)	Episode: "Megalo Dale"
2004	Hope & Faith	Bob Thompson	Episode: "Faith's Husband"
2004	According to Jim	Max	Episode: "Poking the Bear"
2005	Odd Job Jack	William Swillberger III	Episode: "The 2 Marketeers"
2007	The Celebrity Apprentice	Himself	
2007	Law & Order: Criminal Intent	Rev. Calvin Riggins	Episode: "Brother's Keeper"
2008–2009	My Big Redneck Wedding	Himself as host and narrator	16 episodes
2009–2011	Sons of Anarchy	Georgie Caruso	4 episodes
2011	Franklin & Bash	Ronny Streppi	Episode: "You Can't Take It With You"
2012	Hawaii Five-0	Ron Alberts	Episode: "Huakaʻi Kula"
2013	The First Family	Vice President Arthur Crandall	3 episodes
2014	Psych	Garth Mathers	Episode: "A Touch of Sweevil"
2015	Workaholics	George	
2016	Trailer Park Boys	Himself	3 episodes
2016–2019	NCIS: New Orleans	Elvis Bertrand	4 episodes
2017	I'm a Celebrity...Get Me Out of Here!	Himself	
2017–2019	Funny You Should Ask	Himself	41 episodes
2018	The Hunt for the Trump Tapes with Tom Arnold	Himself	8 episodes
2020	World's Funniest Animals	Guest	1 episode
2022	The Rookie: Feds	Miles Butkus	Episode: "The Reaper"
2023	True Lies	Arnie Orwig	Episode: "Bitter Sweethearts"
2023	FUBAR	Norm Carlson	Episode: "Here Today, Gone To-Marrow"
2023	Underdeveloped	Ralph	6 episodes
2024–2025	The Bold and the Beautiful	Captain Deuce Stevens	Guest star, 3 episodes
