= The Curse of Bridge Hollow =

2022 US comedy horror film by Jeff Wadlow

- Theatrical release poster
- Directed by: Jeff Wadlow
- Screenplay by: Todd Berger; Robert Rugan
- Story by: John R. Morey; Todd Berger
- Produced by: Marlon Wayans; Rick Alvarez; Nathan Reimann
- Starring: Marlon Wayans; Priah Ferguson; Kelly Rowland; John Michael Higgins; Lauren Lapkus; Rob Riggle; Nia Vardalos
- Cinematography: David Hennings
- Edited by: Sean Albertson; Derek Ambrosi
- Music by: Christopher Lennertz
- Production company: Ugly Baby Productions
- Distributed by: Netflix
- Release date: October 14, 2022
- Running time: 91 minutes
- Country: United States
- Language: English

The Curse of Bridge Hollow is a 2022 American supernatural comedy horror film directed by Jeff Wadlow from a screenplay by Todd Berger and Robert Rugan. Starring Marlon Wayans, Priah Ferguson, Kelly Rowland, John Michael Higgins, Lauren Lapkus, Rob Riggle, and Nia Vardalos, the film was released by Netflix on October 14, 2022.

== Plot ==
When the Gordon family moves from Brooklyn to the small town Bridge Hollow, the town's obsession with Halloween fascinates daughter Syd and disgusts her scientist father, Howard. She meets her new school's Paranormal Society, who inform her that her family's new house is believed to be haunted.

Despite Howard's contempt for Halloween, his wife Emily makes gluten free and sugar free snacks for the local Stingy Jack festival and Syd puts up Halloween decorations. When Syd lights the lantern she found, many of the family's Halloween decorations come to life and fly away. She learns that the descendant of the woman who died in the house is still alive and elderly in a nursing home, so she takes Howard to discuss the lantern with the woman. She tells them that when lit, it releases Stingy Jack, who will take a soul at midnight to take his place.

Syd meets with the Paranormal Society at school and explains what happened. While there, the group discovers that a resident of their town has a page torn from a spell book that could help them re-trap Jack inside of the lantern. They go to the address of the person who has the page, only to find it is their school principal. After fighting off more of Stingy Jack's minions, the group goes to a crypt to find the incantation for the spell from the original owner of the spell book: the ghost who haunts Syd's new house.

While the Paranormal Society and the principal go to the town square to stop the Halloween decorations from attacking the town, Syd and Howard realize that Emily has left the festival and is at home with the lantern. They go back to their house to return Stingy Jack to his lantern.

Stingy Jack threatens Emily, mistaking her for the person who found his lantern, the one whose soul should take his place. Howard attempts the incantation to bind Jack several times as he tries to take Emily away, but Syd reminds him he has to believe in it for it to work. After Howard says the incantation while believing, Jack is banished again, and all the other Halloween decorations fall down, inanimate again.

After what they have gone through, Howard becomes more accepting of Halloween, Syd joins the Paranormal Society, and Emily begins to bake treats that are not gluten free and sugar free, stating "you only live once".

While putting away Stingy Jack's lantern, Howard and Syd accidentally open a wall and discover many more boxes potentially containing more pumpkin lanterns.

== Cast ==
- Marlon Wayans as Howard Gordon
- Priah Ferguson as Sydney Gordon
- Kelly Rowland as Emily Gordon
- John Michael Higgins as Principal Floyd
- Lauren Lapkus as Mayor Tammy Rice
- Rob Riggle as Sully
- Nia Vardalos as Madam Hawthorne
- Abi Monterey as Ramona
- Holly J. Barrett as Jamie
- Myles Vincent Perez as Mario
- Helen Slayton-Hughes as Victoria

== Reception ==
On Rotten Tomatoes the film holds an approval rating of 46% based on 26 reviews, with an average rating of 5/10. On Metacritic, the film has a weighted average score of 38 out of 100 based on 10 critics, indicating "generally unfavorable" reviews.

== See also ==
- List of films set around Halloween
