= Lewisham College =

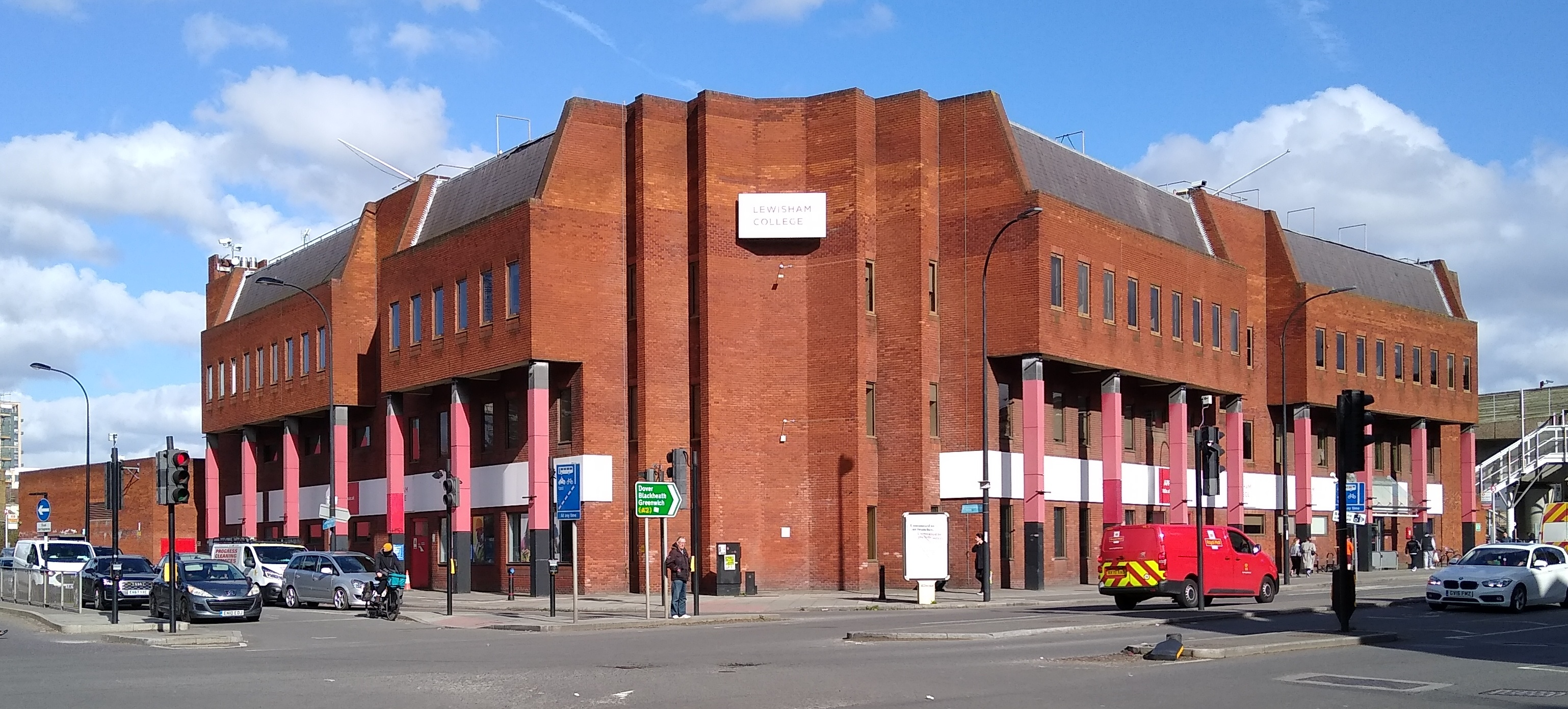
- Church Street campus

Location
- Lewisham Way; London, SE4 1UT; England
- Coordinates: 51.4680°N 0.0263°W

Information
- Type: Further education
- Established: 1970s-1990 – Founding institutions 2012 – constituent college of Lewisham Southwark College; 2017 – constituent college of Newcastle College Group
- Local authority: London Borough of Lewisham
- Department for Education URN: 130415 Tables
- Ofsted: Reports
- Gender: Mixed
- Age: 14+
- Enrolment: 13,600 students
- Website: www.lewisham.ac.uk

Lewisham College is a further education college in the London Borough of Lewisham, south-east London. It was established in 1990, having previously been known as SELTEC (South East London College of Technology) since the early 1970s, which was run by the Inner London Education Authority. The college has two campuses, its main one on Lewisham Way in Brockley, and another one in Church Street, Deptford.

== History ==
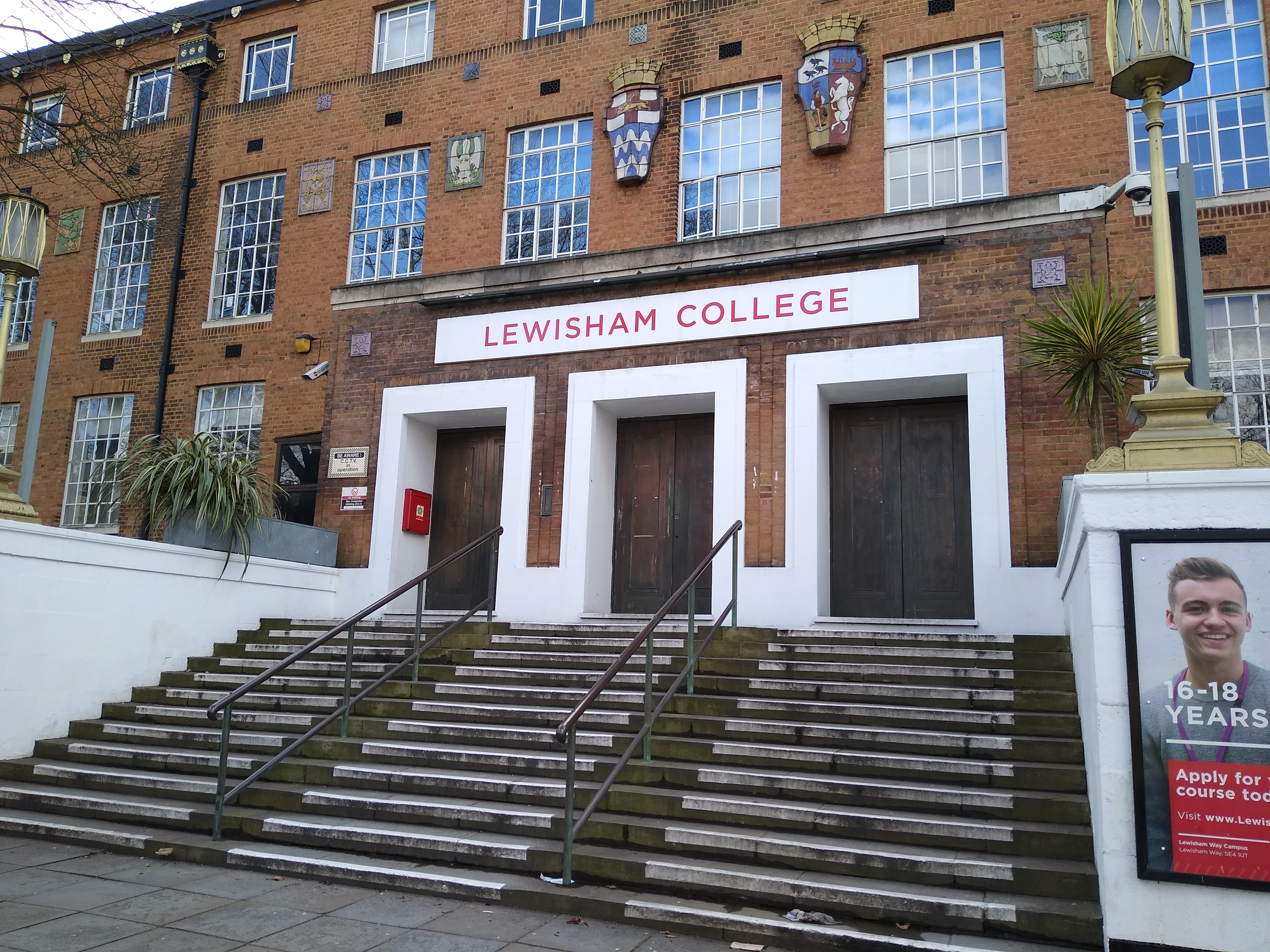
Lewisham Way campus

The Deptford campus of the college opened in 1996.

Lewisham College and Southwark College merged in 2012, having previously existed as separate institutions. Between 2013 and 2014 the college was branded as LeSoCo, before this was dropped. It was then known as Lewisham Southwark College between 2014 and 2018, becoming part of Newcastle College Group in 2017. In October 2018 it was announced by Newcastle College Group (NCG) that Lewisham Southwark College would return to being two separate institutions: Lewisham College and Southwark College.

== Students ==
The college has 16,000 student enrolments and 36,000 course enrolments. The college was a member of the 157 Group (now the Collab Group) of high performing schools. The college mainly serves students living in the local communities of Lewisham, Greenwich and Southwark,

- 39% study full-time
- 61% part-time
- Average age 29
- 57% from ethnic minorities
- 41% from Lewisham
- 13% from Southwark
- 11% from Greenwich
- 59% male 41% female
- 644 full-time equivalent staff
- 2 campuses

== Notable alumni ==
=== Lewisham College ===
- Daniel Bedingfield, musician
- Nomhle Nkonyeni, South African actress
- Duwayne Brooks, Liberal Democrat politician
- Thomas Caterer, pioneer schoolteacher
- Max Gradel, footballer
- Keeley Hazell, model and actress
- Leon Lai, Hong Kong actor and singer
- Shakira Martin, 2017-2019 President of NUS
- Suzanne May, actress
- Novelist, grime MC
- Shaun Parkes, actor
- Georgia South, musician/bassist of Nova Twins
- Aaron Pierre, actor
- Khadijah Dare, Islamic State of Iraq and the Levant member
