= Suzanne May =

British actress

Suzanne May is an English actress, born in Newcastle upon Tyne, Tyne and Wear in North East England.

== Early life ==
She moved around with her family until settling in Reading, Berkshire where she spent most of her childhood. At the age of 16 she left formal education to study dance at Lewisham College in South London. At 18 she left to attend a 3-year degree in theatre arts at the London Studio Centre. Upon graduating May was awarded the Sheila O'Neill Award for most outstanding all-round performer (singing, dancing, acting) previous winners include Elizabeth Hurley and Laurie Brett.

== Acting career ==
May made her feature film acting debut in the film Gentlemen Broncos opposite Sam Rockwell and Jemaine Clement and directed by Jared Hess. She has since appeared in Green Street 2: Stand Your Ground where she played Michelle "Red" Miller opposite Ross McCall, directed by Jesse Johnson. May also scored a role in indie film The Scenesters playing news reporter Jewell Wright with Los Angeles-based comedy group the Vacationeers and Sherilyn Fenn.

== Filmography ==
- Gentlemen Broncos (2009)
- The Scenesters (2009)
- Green Street 2: Stand Your Ground (2009)
- The Diner (short film, 2009)
- Nothing (short film, 2008)
- Two Weeks Notice (short film, 2007)
