= Priah Ferguson =

American actress (born 2006)

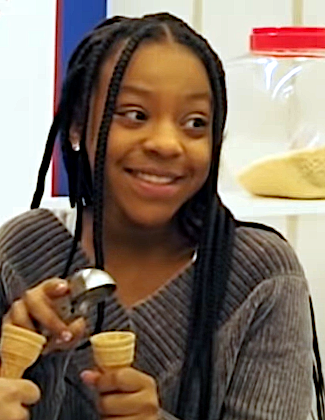
- Ferguson in 2019
- Born: Priah Nicole Ferguson; October 1, 2006 (age 20); Atlanta, Georgia, U.S.
- Citizenship: United States
- Education: Fayette County High School
- Occupation: Actress
- Years active: 2015–present
- Known for: Stranger Things

Priah Nicole Ferguson (born October 1, 2006) is an American actress. She is best known for her role as Erica Sinclair on the Netflix series Stranger Things. Ferguson began acting at a young age and her career spans TV and film.

== Early life and education ==
Ferguson was born on October 1, 2006, in Atlanta, Georgia. She has a younger sister.

Ferguson is a 2025 graduate of Fayette County High School in Fayetteville, Georgia, where she was a member of the dance team.

== Career ==
Ferguson was motivated to start acting after watching the films Crooklyn and Daddy's Little Girls. In 2015, she began acting in locally-produced short and independent films. In 2016, she made her television debut on the FX Networks show Atlanta and the Civil War drama Mercy Street.

In 2017, Ferguson was cast in season 2 of the Netflix science fiction horror series Stranger Things as Erica Sinclair, the younger sister of Lucas Sinclair, portrayed by Caleb McLaughlin. She was promoted from recurring to series regular in season 3, appearing through the series' fifth and final season in 2025.

In 2018, she appeared in the film The Oath. She appeared in the 2022 Halloween comedy The Curse of Bridge Hollow (formerly titled Boo!) alongside Marlon Wayans. In 2023, Ferguson voiced the character Lisa in My Dad the Bounty Hunter.

== Philanthropy ==
In 2015, Ferguson was selected as a spokesperson for United Way of Atlanta.

== Personal life ==
In 2019, Ferguson threw the first pitch in a baseball game between the Pittsburgh Pirates and the San Diego Padres. In 2022, Ferguson partnered with ThreadUp to promote thrift shopping.

== Filmography ==
=== Film ===
| Year | Title | Role | Notes |
|---|---|---|---|
| 2015 | Suga Water | Young Kai | Short film |
| 2016 | Deus ex Machina | Little Girl | Short film |
| 2016 | Ends | Charlie | Short film |
| 2017 | La Vie Magnifique De Charlie | Young Brandy | |
| 2018 | The Oath | Hardy Fontaine | |
| 2022 | The Curse of Bridge Hollow | Sydney Gordon | |
| TBA | Samo Lives | | Post-production |

=== Television ===
| Year | Title | Role | Notes |
|---|---|---|---|
| 2016 | Coffee X Cream | Michelle | 2 episodes |
| 2016 | Atlanta | Asia | Episode: "Streets on Lock" |
| 2017–2025 | Stranger Things | Erica Sinclair | Recurring role (season 2); main role (season 3– season 5) |
| 2017 | Mercy Street | Girl | Episode: "One Equal Temper" |
| 2017 | Daytime Divas | Fatima | Episode: "Lunch is on Us" |
| 2019 | Bluff City Law | Erika | Episode: "When the Levee Breaks" |
| 2022–2025 | Hamster & Gretel | Bailey Carter (voice) | Recurring role |
| 2023 | My Dad the Bounty Hunter | Lisa (voice) | Main role |
