= Todd Berger =

American actor

- Born: April 5, 1979 (age 47); New Orleans, Louisiana
- Education: The University of Texas at Austin
- Occupations: Film director, producer, screenwriter, actor
- Spouse: Helena Wei (m. 2009)

Todd Berger (born April 5, 1979) is an American film director, screenwriter, actor, and novelist most prominently known for writing and directing the feature films It's a Disaster, Cover Versions, The Scenesters, and the documentary Don't Eat The Baby: Adventures at post-Katrina Mardi Gras.

== Early life and education ==
Berger was born and raised in the Algiers neighborhood of New Orleans, Louisiana. As a child and teenager he would make movies with friends using a VHS camera, and in 2015 used some of that footage with newly shot material to make the sci-fi time travel short film Teenage Wasteland, which won the Grand Jury Prize at the 2015 No Budget Film Festival.

He is a graduate of The University of Texas at Austin with a degree in film, where he worked for the student television station KVR-TV and wrote and directed the nationally syndicated comedy show Campus Loop. In a class at the University of Texas at Austin Department of Radio–Television–Film he wrote and the produced the puppet short film Manifest Destiny, directed by classmate Dee Austin Robertson, which later inspired them to create the idea for the film The Happytime Murders.

== Film and TV career ==
Berger's first feature film as writer/director was the documentary Don't Eat The Baby: Adventures at post-Katrina Mardi Gras, which played the closing night of the 2007 New Orleans Film Festival. The film examined the city of New Orleans staging its first Mardi Gras after the devastation of Hurricane Katrina and included interviews with Mardi Gras historians, activists, and residents effected by the flood. The film's title refers to the plastic baby hidden inside a King Cake.

His next film was The Scenesters, which he made with the comedic film group The Vacationeers (Kevin M. Brennan, Jeff Grace, and Blaise Miller). The found-footage black comedy, which told the tale of crime scene workers attempting to catch a serial killer, premiered at the 2009 Austin Film Festival, played the 2010 Slamdance Film Festival (where it won the "Most Interesting Film Award") and later received distribution through Monterey Media.

Following that was It's a Disaster, starring Julia Stiles, David Cross, and America Ferrera. The black comedy was the story of four couples who meet for brunch only to find themselves trapped inside during a VX (nerve agent) attack. It premiered at the 2012 Los Angeles Film Festival where it was acquired for distribution by Oscilloscope Pictures. The Hollywood Reporter called it "one of the funniest films of recent vintage."

His most recent film Cover Versions was produced by Lakeshore Entertainment and starred Katie Cassidy, Drake Bell, Debby Ryan, and Jerry Trainor. A murder mystery involving four band members telling varying accounts of a night of sex, drugs, and murder before their first big show at a popular music festival, it premiered at the 2018 Palm Springs Film Festival and was acquired for distribution by Sony Pictures. Parts of the film were shot on location during the Kaaboo Del Mar music festival in San Diego, California.

In addition to the films he's directed, Berger wrote the Netflix Halloween comedy The Curse of Bridge Hollow, original drafts of The Happytime Murders, an R-rated comedy puppet film directed by Brian Henson and starring Melissa McCarthy, and is writing a screenplay for a film adaptation of Where's Waldo? He also wrote the ABC Family original film Chasing Christmas and is credited as the writer of several animation projects, including Kung Fu Panda: Secrets of the Furious Five.

Berger directed the first season of the television show Liberty Crossing which premiered on the go90 network in January 2018.

Berger has appeared as an actor in films, such as Southland Tales, and on the television shows Parks and Recreation and Maron.

Berger has been involved with the Slamdance Film Festival as a feature film programmer.

In December 2022 it was announced that Berger was developing the television show "12 Rocks In A Box," which he created, with Bill Lawrence's Doozer Productions and Warner Bros. Television Studios for HBO Max.

== Books ==
Berger wrote the novel Showdown City, a satirical modern-day Western published in 2016 by Diversion Books. Publishers Weekly gave the book a starred review and called it a "terrific debut novel."

== Music videos ==
Berger has directed several music videos, for, among others, Wallpaper., Wayland, Maxie Dean, and Escalator Hill.

== Filmography ==
Film and television roles
Title	Year	Director	Screenwriter	Actor	Acting Role	Notes
Chasing Christmas	2005		Yes			TV movie
Southland Tales	2006			Yes	Bing Zinneman	
Kung Fu Panda: Secrets of the Furious Five	2008		Yes			Short film; 'Nominated', 2009 Annie Award, Best Writing in an Animated Television Production or Short Form
The Scenesters	2009	Yes	Yes	Yes	Wallace Cotten	
Parks and Recreation	2011			Yes	Kip	TV series, 1 episode ("Road Trip")
The Smurfs: A Christmas Carol	2011		Yes			Short film
Kung Fu Panda: Secrets of the Masters	2011		Yes	Yes	Pig Server (voice) Rabbit (voice)	Short film
Holiday Road	2012	Yes	Yes	Yes	Tom	(Directed and wrote "January" and "October" segments)
Cinema Six	2012			Yes	Ron Garber	
It's a Disaster	2012	Yes	Yes	Yes	Hal Lousteau	
Good Night	2013			Yes	Charlie	
Cover Versions	2018	Yes	Yes	Yes	Pizza Guy	
The Happytime Murders	2018		Yes			
The Curse of Bridge Hollow	2022		Yes			

=== Awards and nominations ===
Year	Association	Nominated work	Category	Result	Ref(s)
2019	Golden Raspberry Awards	The Happytime Murders	Worst Screenplay	Nominated	
