= Queen of Meth =

American true crime documentary miniseries

- Genre: True crime Documentary
- Directed by: Julian P. Hobbs; Bari Pearlman
- Country of origin: United States
- Original language: English
- No. of seasons: 1
- No. of episodes: 3

Production
- Executive producer: Elli Hakami
- Producers: Julian P. Hobbs; Lewis Albrow; Stephen Kemp; Adrian Murray; Kristian Day
- Production locations: Ottumwa, Iowa
- Running time: 46–48 minutes
- Production company: Talos Films

Original release
- Network: Discovery+
- Release: May 7, 2021

Queen of Meth is a 2021 American three part documentary series centering upon Lori Arnold, who was a major methamphetamine dealer in the Midwest. Her meth production and distribution operation was based on a 170-acre ranch in Ottumwa, Iowa, and grossed more than $200,000 per week at its peak. In 1991 she was arrested by the DEA, who seized more than $10 million in assets from her. Convicted of drug trafficking and money laundering, Arnold spent 15 years in prison. Lori is the sister of actor and comedian Tom Arnold.

== Episodes ==
No.	Title	Directed by	Original release date
1	"Daughter of Anarchy"	Julian P. Hobbs and Bari Pearlman	May 7, 2021
2	"Art of the Dealer"	Julian P. Hobbs and Bari Pearlman	May 7, 2021
3	"To Catch a Queen"	Julian P. Hobbs and Bari Pearlman	May 7, 2021
