= Chasing Christmas =

2005 American television film

- Based on: A Christmas Carol
- Written by: Todd Berger
- Directed by: Ron Oliver
- Starring: Tom Arnold
- Country of origin: United States
- Original language: English

Production
- Running time: 81 minutes

Original release
- Network: ABC Family
- Release: December 4, 2005

Chasing Christmas is a 2005 contemporary re-telling of the 1843 Charles Dickens novella A Christmas Carol. This ABC Family film, written by Todd Berger and directed by Ron Oliver, stars Tom Arnold as Jack Cameron, who is a man with a Scrooge-type personality. He is stuck with his wife, whom he caught with another man at their daughter's Christmas play. The sad events of his life, including his wife's infidelity, led him to hate Christmas. This prompted the Ghost of Christmas Past (Leslie Jordan) and Ghost of Christmas Present (Andrea Roth) to show Jack what Christmas is all about, but Christmas Past wanted to stay in the past, and Jack and Christmas Present ended up on an adventure to put Christmas Past back on track.

Brittney Wilson, who played the daughter of Jack Cameron, was nominated for Best Performance in a TV Movie, Miniseries or Special - Supporting Young Actress at the 27th Young Artist Awards.

== See also ==
- List of Christmas films
- List of ghost films
- Adaptations of A Christmas Carol
