= My Dad the Bounty Hunter =

Animated science-fiction television series

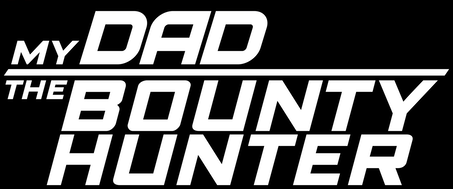
- Genre: Science fiction Action-adventure; Comedy-drama
- Created by: Everett Downing Jr.; Patrick Harpin
- Written by: Everett Downing Jr.; Patrick Harpin
- Story by: Juston Gordon-Montgomery
- Creative director: Alex Konstad
- Voices of: Laz Alonso; Yvonne Orji; Priah Ferguson; JeCobi Swain
- Composer: Joshua Mosley
- Countries of origin: United States; France
- Original language: English
- No. of seasons: 2
- No. of episodes: 19

Production
- Executive producers: Everett Downing Jr.; Patrick Harpin
- Running time: 22 minutes
- Production companies: Dwarf Animation Studio; Netflix Animation Studios

Original release
- Network: Netflix
- Release: February 9 – August 17, 2023

My Dad the Bounty Hunter is an animated science fiction action-adventure comedy-drama television series by Everett Downing Jr. and Patrick Harpin for Netflix. The series premiered on February 9, 2023. Season 2 premiered on August 17, 2023.

The series received positive reviews for its relatable story, likable characters, social commentary, and portrayal of Black families. The first season was released in its entirety on February 9, 2023.

The series was cancelled after two seasons.

== Premise ==
The series follows the story of Terry, who is followed by his kids, Lisa and Sean, who learn he is a bounty hunter, and drawn into a space adventure of sorts.

== Cast ==
=== Main ===
- Laz Alonso as Terry Hendrix / Sabo Brok; Father of Lisa and Sean and the husband of Tess, and secretly conceals his job as a bounty hunter named Sabo Brok from his children and his wife, Tess.
- Yvonne Orji as Tess / Janeera; she is a doloraami and the wife of Terry and mother of Lisa and Sean. She is estranged from Terry. According to Downing Jr., the pigmentation of her character matches Orji in real life.
- Priah Ferguson as Lisa; the half human-half doloraami Daughter of Terry and Tess and older sister of Sean. She is intelligent, sassy, quick witted, and when she sets her mind to anything, she is determined to finish it. Ferguson said that she had no say in the character design, but described Lisa as "so cute" and was impressed animators "even got her edges, the braids, [and] her baby hair".
- JeCobi Swain as Sean; a half human-half doloraami Younger brother of Lisa and son of Terry and Tess. He is nerdy and can become anxious, causing his eye to twitch. According to Downing Jr., Sean's physical condition was inspired by his own daughter's condition.
- Patrick Harpin as Blobby, also known as Meethal Raythox Bartholomew III, a liquid alien who becomes friends with the family in Season 2.

=== Villains ===
- Jim Rash as Tim Fixer; the enforcer for the Endless Horizons Conglomerate (EHC). At the end of season 1 he was killed by the family and told them that the Conglomerate will get them.
- Chelsea Peretti as Pam; the new devious head of the Conglomerate in Season 2. She claimed that she changed the organization to connect the universe and bring peace to people. However, her real motive is to make all the kalatite the property of EHC. At the end of season 2, she was killed by Janeera.

=== Recurring ===
- Yvette Nicole Brown as KRS; a robotic assistant.
- Rob Riggle as Glorlox; a Loxian and Terry's former business partner and currently his rival until the end of Season 2, when he is a friend again.
- Maddie Taylor as Torga; she is part of Glorox's crew.
- Everett Downing Jr. as Bogdog; He is part of Glorox's crew and Sean's rival until the end of Season 2.
- Kari Wahlgren as Lootbat; she is part of Glorox's crew and Lisa's rival until the end of Season 2. Wahlgren also plays KRS during Season 1.
- Jamie Chung as Vax; she is the top bounty of Sabo in season 1.
- Leslie Uggams as Grandma; she is the mother of Terry and grandmother of his kids. She and Peanut are the only family members who hasn't been to space. They do not know anything about the aliens until the end of season 2.
- Janet Hubert as Empress Gurira, a ruler of Doloraam.
- Adewale Akinnuoye-Agbaje as Emperor Odoman, a ruler of Doloraam, husband of Gurira, and person who ordered Terry kidnapped.
- Thando Thabethe as Adja, a friend of Tess.
- Keith David as B'Caala, a tiger-like Vunaari man who was set to be married to Tess before she fled Doloraam at a young age with Terry.

=== Guest role ===
- Patrick Harpin as Darren and Reggie the Janitor.
- Devin Bright as Damian; Video gamer who plays Sean in episode 1.
- Wahlgren as Mike; Video gamer who plays Sean in episode 1.
- Rash as Video game announcer.
- Tim Meadows as Principal Lieb, the principal of the school Lisa and Sean attend on Earth.
- Ralph Ineson as Widowmaker, a bounty hunter, and gambler, who kidnapped Terry for the Doloraam royal family.
- Godfrey as Ja Boluu, a public defender who has a bad reputation.
- Venice May Wong as Halvey, a being that becomes friends with Sean and Lisa.

== Episodes ==
=== Series overview ===
Series overview
| Season | Episodes | Originally released |
|---|---|---|
| 1 | 10 | February 9, 2023 |
| 2 | 9 | August 17, 2023 |

=== Season 1 (2023) ===
{{Episode list

| No. overall | No. in season | Title | Directed by | Written by | Original release date |
|---|---|---|---|---|---|
| 1 | 1 | "The Bounty Hunter" | Everett Downing Jr., Patrick Harpin, and Kenji Ono (supervising director) | Everett Downing Jr., Shakira Pressley, and Patrick Harpin | February 9, 2023 |
Terry hunts down a liquid-alien fugitive named Meethal Raythox. Back on Earth, Lisa exacts virtual revenge on a group of video gamers who expel her brother Sean from their group during a video game match. Later, their mother, Tess, takes them to spend the weekend with their father, Terry, whom she is separated from. After the Endless Horizons Conglomerate (EHC) agent Fixer recruits a reluctant Terry to hunt down a new bounty, the children stowaway in his car but find themselves in a spaceship. The siblings are chased by Terry's robotic assistant KRS. After encountering their father and learning about his secret job, they narrowly escape colliding with asteroids.
| 2 | 2 | "Bucky Quanto's" | Everett Downing Jr., Patrick Harpin, and Kenji Ono (supervising director) | Everett Downing Jr. and Patrick Harpin | February 9, 2023 |
Terry brings Lisa and Sean with him to Bucky Quanto's, his favorite restaurant in the galaxy, said to have legendary wings. Against Terry's orders, Lisa and Sean sneak into the restaurant disguised as an alien and a robot, respectively. Terry meets with a contact named Kryll, seeking information on a bounty named Vax. Terry later interrogates Kryll in the toilet and learns that Vax is headed to Chillion 5. Meanwhile, Lisa wins a gambling game with Terry's estranged associate Glorlox. Unwilling to accept defeat, Glorlox instigates a fight with Terry, which descends into a brawl. As a result of the brawl, Terry is banned from Bucky Quanto's for life. Taking the kids along, Terry embarks on his hunt for Vax but is trailed by Glorlox.
| 3 | 3 | "Pit Stop" | Vince Aparo and Kenji Ono (supervising director) | Adele Williams | February 9, 2023 |
Sean, Lisa, and Terry make a pit stop at an interstellar convenience store to stock up on groceries. While Terry chats with Tess, Sean befriends the robotic store manager Karl and teaches him about fun. While exploring the store, the two encounter several predatory spider-like aliens, who have devoured other robots. Meanwhile, Lisa, who is angry and frustrated with her father, confides in a mysterious stranger, who turns out to be the fugitive Vax. Terry recognizes Vax and engages in a fight with her. Before he can overpower her, he is distracted by Sean and Lisa, who have come under attack from the spiders. Sean rescues his children, and they escape aboard Terry's starship. However, Sean damages one of the KRS's starship wings while using a laser cannon to fight off the spider aliens.
| 4 | 4 | "Pulga" | Ian Abando and Kenji Ono (supervising director) | Patrick Harpin | February 9, 2023 |
After landing on the planet Pulga, Terry, along with Lisa and Sean, visit a local settlement to obtain a spare part for KRS's damaged starship wing. Despite Terry's orders, Lisa and Sean go off on their own. While Lisa has her chicken bite stolen by a con artist, Sean befriends a dog-like moog and gets involved in a gladiatorial fight with another robot to obtain the spare part. Glorlox and his associates Lootbat and Bogdog pursue Terry, seeking information about his bounty. Lisa and Sean help their father escape by distracting Glorlox's associates. Terry and the children escape after Glorlox offends the locals by hurting a moog, which the locals revere.
| 5 | 5 | "Chillion-5" | Ian Abando and Kenji Ono (supervising director) | Shakira Pressley | February 9, 2023 |
Terry tells his kids that they are going to "Chilla World," a Conglomerate-run theme park and zoo known as the "happiest place" in the entire galaxy. While "Chilla World" claims to be a refuge for the near-extinct diminutive feline Chilla species, Lisa learns that the Conglomerate is forcing Chilla slaves to extract ore from underground mines beneath the zoo. When Lisa tells her dad, Terry is indifferent and states that his sole concerns are working for the Conglomerate and protecting his children. While browsing through the theme park, Lisa encounters Vax, whom she discovers to be the leader of a group of freedom fighters seeking to liberate the Chillas.
| 6 | 6 | "Chillion-5 Part 2: Rise of the Chillas" | Kai Akira and Kenji Ono (supervising director) | Eric Rivera | February 9, 2023 |
Sean spends time with his father Terry and discusses the latter's difficult relationship with Lisa. Meanwhile, Vax interrogates Lisa, who claims to be an estranged former associate of "Sabo Brok." Satisfied, Vax allows her to join her group of freedom fighters, which consists of Setelva and McKoren. While Lisa infiltrates the control room and releases the zoo animals, Vax and her team infiltrate the mines and disable the collar generators, freeing the Chillas. After overpowering the guards, Lisa and the freedom fighters flee the zoo with the liberated Chillas, who are led by Chakalau. While fleeing into the forest, Conglomerate forces arrive. Though the freedom fighters and Chillas split up, Vax is captured by Terry. Lisa is shocked to discover the extent of her father's involvement with the Conglomerate.
| 7 | 7 | "Planet Fall" | Cole Harrington and Kenji Ono (supervising director) | Juston Gordon-Montgomery | February 9, 2023 |
Following Vax's capture, Lisa argues with Terry that Vax is not a criminal. Terry defends his work as a bounty hunter for the Conglomerate by arguing that his work supports their basic needs, housing, and schooling. Feeling uneasy about his work, Terry questions the Fixer, who reveals that Vax was a former Conglomerate security worker who became disillusioned with the company's exploitative activities. Lisa frees Vax, and they escape in a shuttle with Sean. Terry and KRS pursue the stolen shuttle into a sulfuric gas storm above Chillion 5's upper atmosphere. Their chase is complicated by the arrival of Glorlox and his minions. Following a dogfight, Glorlox traps Vax's shuttle in a tractor beam and shoots down Terry's ship, seemingly killing Terry.
| 8 | 8 | "Bizarre Ride" | Kai Akira and Kenji Ono (supervising director) | Patrick Harpin | February 9, 2023 |
In a flashback scene, bounty hunter Terry meets Glorlox while attempting to apprehend an alien fugitive named Zeno. After Glorlox gives Terry half of the cut from the bounty, the two form a partnership. Glorlox is troubled by his role in Terry's presumed death and imprisons Lisa and Sean with Vax. On Chillion, Terry is captured by the liberated Chilla tribe led by Chakarau. After Chakarau learns that Terry is Lisa's father, he and KRS join forces with the Chillas to rescue his children. They overpower a contingent of Conglomerate soldiers and steal their shuttle, which they use to reach Glorlox's starship. Meanwhile, Vax, Sean, and Lisa attempt to escape their holding cell but are recaptured by Torga. Disguised as Conglomerate soldiers, Terry, KRS, and the Chillas board Glorlox's ship. With the help of Vax, they capture Glorlox and his associates. Terry's reunion with his children is interrupted by the arrival of a Conglomerate starship.
| 9 | 9 | "Showdown" | Cole Harrington and Kenji Ono (supervising director) | Everett Downing Jr. | February 9, 2023 |
Glorlox and his associates turn the tables on Terry, Vax, and the Chillas. However, Lisa, Sean, and KRS are able to escape. Glorlox hands Terry, Vax, and the Chillas over to the Conglomerate but is upset with the Fixer giving a 15% finder's fee. While Lisa infiltrates the Conglomerate warship to rescue her dad and the others, Sean and KRS outwit Bogdog and hijack Glorlox's starship. Despite being captured, Lisa manages to escape with Terry and the others after Glorlox attacks the Fixer, causing damage to the ship. Meanwhile, Sean tries to help free his sister and father, but ends up fighting off Bogdog and rescues his family. The two factions join forces to fight their way out of the Conglomerate starship. However, Terry dumps Glorlox and his associates and flees on Glorlox's starship with Lisa, Sean, Vax, KRS and the Chillas. Glorlox and his associates travel on an underpowered starship but attract the attention of a large space creature, which mistakes them for a mating partner.

=== Season 2 (2023) ===
| No. overall | No. in season | Title | Directed by | Written by | Original release date |
|---|---|---|---|---|---|
| 11 | 1 | "Abduction" | Ian Abando and Kai Akira | Shakira Pressley and Justin Gordon-Montgomery | August 17, 2023 |
Terry is kidnapped by an unnamed bounty hunter and his wife, Tess, goes to save him. She leaves Terry's mother to watch over Sean and Lisa, but they attempt to hide in the truck of the car, but she busts them. She steers the flying car to Glorlox’s starship, and sets the coordinates to Bucky Quantos. Meanwhile, Lisa leads the way for them to bust out of the house, so they can help rescue their dad, but Sean inadvertently releases a scammer alien named Blobby that their dad captured. He uses a craft registered to a Conglomerate executive to get them into space, en route to Bucky Quantos. It is later revealed there is an active bounty on Tess. Lisa and Sean make their way there and they all escape in Glorox's ship. Tess agrees to have them go to the near Bounty Exchange Facility, despite the risks.
| 12 | 2 | "Jailbreak" | Cole Harrington | Ryan Harer | August 17, 2023 |
Sean, Lisa, Tess, Glorlox, and Blobby work together to break into the Bounty Exchange Facility in hopes that Terry will be there. They all go with disguises and have a plan in hopes they can find out about Terry. Later, the Creator, Pam, declares a new phase of the Conglomerate is beginning, with changing food options at Bucky Quantos, to changing the facility to "rehabilitate" those housed inside, and shows off the newest invention, a warp gate, which Sean is secretly watching. It is revealed that a freelance bounty hunter named Widowmaker kidnapped Terry, not the Conglomerate. After this, they try to escape the prison without being captured themselves. They get out and Glorox frees his old team. Blobby inadvertently then helps them, willingly. In a final scene, Pam wonders why they broke into the prison just to look at the record of Terry.
| 13 | 3 | "Ocanom Grind" | Vince Aparo | Patrick Harpin | August 17, 2023 |
Tess admits she is scared that she doesn't know where Terry is and Sean bonds with Blobby, and Tess reveals she grew up in an environment with constant danger. They make their way to the Oconom Casino to get information on where Terry is being held. Tess and Blobby change their clothes to blend in with the crowd, while Sean and Lisa are brought to a daycare center. Lisa helps Blobby effectively play Galactic Poker and win, except she faces a strong opponent in the Widowmaker. Tess teases that Sabo Brok is the best bounty hunter, leading him to reveal he carted Terry across the galaxy. However, Lisa helps Blobby get the winning hand in the game, taking money from the Widowmaker. Later, Blobby gets kidnapped and the kids convince Tess to help save him. They do so, and the Widowmaker reveals that people from Doloraam kidnapped him, terrifying Tess.
| 14 | 4 | "This is Doloraam" | Ian Abando | Everett Downing | August 17, 2023 |
Terry is brought in to stand trial in Doloraam before Emperor Odoman and a public defender named Ja Boluu promises to do the talking on his behalf, where he is charged with stealing a spacecraft, assaulting a royal guard and abducting the princess of Doloraam, Sa Janeera. It is revealed that Tess is Sa Janeera, which excites Sean, but annoys Lisa, as it is another secret. Back in the trial, the emperor demands to know that Terry did with his daughter and he says she got away. Odoman and Empress Gurira meet the Pam, the new head of the Conglomerate, and say they are still discussing her offer. Terry goes through the Tribulations of Fire while Lisa remains annoyed, claiming their life on Doloraam would have been better than on Earth. Duke B'Caala tries to get Terry to tell him where Tess is, but he refuses to cooperate. In the final scene, Tess sets the course for a new location, to visit an old friend.
| 15 | 5 | "Old Friends" | Kai Akira | Tomi Adeyemi | August 17, 2023 |
They all go to Veeger-79 and go into a club, meeting her old friend, Adja. Terry continues to go through the Tribulations of Fire. Empress Gurira and the royal court consider the offer from Pam of the Conglomerate, who uses the warp gate as a way to pitch their new mission, and try and make it beneficial to them. However, Gurira is not convinced, despite the pleading of B'Caala, annoying Pam. Later, Adja tells Lisa about what Tess did in the past, saying she was a great warrior. Adja and Tess spar, with Sean, Blobby, and Lisa watching. It is revealed that B'Caala is working with Pam to ensure that the royal family makes a deal with the Conglomerate. Gurira asks Odoman where he was, noting the threats facing the kingdom. Odoman brings in Terry and explains how special Tess was to him. Tess claims she didn't have a choice and had to leave Doloraam. Tess releases that Sean and Lisa are kidnapped and totally loses it.
| 16 | 6 | "Wolves & Sheep" | Cole Harrington | Tomi Adeyemi | August 17, 2023 |
Blobby, Tess, and Adja team together to rescue Sean and Lisa. The robot, Beta, calls Pam, but she is annoyed, as the deal isn't working out. Pam declares she is tired of being nice. Blobby, Tess, and Adja bust into the EHC command ship, determined to save the kids at any cost. Faced by Beta, Tess makes her connection to her Doloraami, but it isn't enough, leading Adja to save her at the last moment. Blobby reunites with his other half, while they find Sean and Lisa there. Pam and the other robots bow, saying they wouldn't hurt the heirs of Doloraami royalty, surprising them all.
| 17 | 7 | "For the Throne" | Vince Aparo | Shakira Pressley | August 17, 2023 |
Tess returns on a EHC ship to Doloraam and her parents embrace her, and they meet Sean and Lisa. Tess confronts her parents about the kidnapping of Terry in front of her, Sean, and Lisa. Odoman admits that he kidnapped Terry, and it turns out he is being treated like a prince in an underground chamber. Tess, Sean, and Lisa reunite with Terry. B'Caala begins to propose a plan to Pam, but she says they don't need him anymore, and predicts that by the end of the day, all the Kalatite Crystals on the planet will be the property of the Conglomerate. The Kingdom throws a ball to celebrate the return of Tess, celebrate her husband Terry, and two children. Tess tells her parents that Earth is more of her home than Doloraami. B'Caala crashes the party but does not get a warm welcome and agrees to fight Terry, annoying Pam yet again. During the duel, Terry gets distracted when he chooses to save a Vunaari child, which allows B'Caala to gain the upper hand. However, B'Caala is called out for his cowardice by his Vunaari tribe, who respect Terry for saving the child, and strip B'Caala of his royal position as a Duke. Gurira and Odoman are told that the Conglomerate are "bad news". Gurira provides Pam with a reward, but rejects the Kalatite deal, causing the Conglomerate to invade the planet, using the warp gate.
| 18 | 8 | "Tales of Doloraam: Part 1" | Ian Abando | Justin Gordon-Montgomery | August 17, 2023 |
The Conglomerate begins their invasion of the planet and a defensive force is put around the Kingdom, as they prepare to repel the Conglomerate and its machines. They fight back the robots inside the Kingdom. Lisa connects with the Kalatite and joins the fight, with Adja welcoming her. Beta informs Pam that their ground forces have been reduced to "less than 40%" and she orders the next wave to enter, which knocks down the energy force. Sean and Blobby recall the ship, so they can destroy the portal together, and they get to the main computer for the portal, to shut it down. Sean pleads with Beta to not kill him, and allow them to enact the shutdown protocol. Bogdog saves Sean, Glorox comes in with his ship, and Sean completes the shutdown protocol, shutting down the warp gate and destroying a Conglomerate ship. It is then revealed the Conglomerate has made their way to the quarries, to complete their ultimate goal.
| 19 | 9 | "Tales of Doloraam: Part 2" | Kai Akira | Patrick Harpin | August 17, 2023 |
The Conglomerate machines do their drilling and collection of crystals and Pam declares the robots need to speed up. Blobby tells Sean that someone is puppeting the drones remotely and Tess goes searching for her. Later, B'Caala tells her where Pam is, to atone for his past actions. She fights Pam in hand-to-hand combat and pulls out the neural link, shutting down the robots. However, the ship she is on crashes. She faces Pam in her true form, fighting her in a swamp, and winning at the last second, despite being injured. One month later, they are all back on Earth and are telling Tess to take it easy, and preparing it for the arrival of her parents. Lisa shows Adja around Earth, Blobby praises Sean's story, and they all play a game of football together. In a post-credits scene, the warp gate reactivates and a ship begins to fly through, thus ending the series on a cliffhanger.

== Production and release ==
On October 29, 2020, Netflix announced that My Dad the Bounty Hunter had begun development. At the time of the announcement, Polygon called it a "family-friendly take on The Mandalorian and said the show is "backed by a ton of Black talent".

The series was given an order for a 10-episode first season. The series came together after Downing Jr. and Harpin met at Sony Pictures Animation Studio, with Downing Jr. telling him that he wanted to do a story "with a Black family at the center as a love letter to my family", and they connected on "how real" 1980s sci-fi films were. The series was animated by the French animation studio, Dwarf Animation, Shakira Pressley was a writer for the series, as was Downing Jr. and Harpin. According to Rolling Stone, the series had a majority-Black writers room, which included writer Tomi Adeyemi, and is "a completely original story" rather than a IP. Juston Gordon-Montgomery was the story editor for the series, along with Alex Konstad as art director, and Andrew Chesworth as character design supervisor.

Before the show's premiere, Harpin told Animation Magazine that the show was crafted with the daughter of Downing Jr. behind, but was visually and narratively interesting to young fans, with an aesthetic reminiscent of Alien and The Last Starfighter which he and Downing Jr. liked. In the same interview, Downing Jr. stated that the show's production designer Yuki Demers was instrumental in the show's design, and that he was shown photographs of Black men and women to make sure the character designs were accurate. Harpin and Downing Jr. further argued that show's "cinematic approach to storytelling" was important, and that they encouraged "intentionally cinematic style" so that the storyboarders and animators could be more creative. Both also noted they discovered "unique opportunities" for the show's team during "quarantine and beyond", and praised interconnectivity of those working on the show.

In another interview with TV Insider, Harpin said they wanted to use 2D animation but it made more financial sense to do the series in 3D animation because they "wouldn't have to build all those sets", but kept flashbacks in 2D. Downing Jr. noted the importance of casting and that they wanted Priah to voice a character, while Harpin noted the challenges of recording lines because of the COVID-19 pandemic. Harpin and Downing Jr. also emphasized the importance of their show not talking down to kids, but in remaining honest and true, giving characters flaws. When asked about season 2, Downing Jr. said that they would like to "focus on mom" and give her "a shot in the captain's seat."

A trailer for the series was released on November 16, 2022. A second trailer was posted on January 12, 2023. The first season premiered on Netflix on February 9, 2023.

In an interview with the LA Times after the season one premiere, Downing Jr. and Patrick Harpin said that the show's inspiration "is personal", noted the family dynamics in the series and sci-fi influences including The Fifth Element, Star Wars, Outland, and "wild '80s stuff for kids". They also noted that the Conglomerate in the show is like the "space colonialism" written about by Frank Herbert. Harpin also told Rolling Stone that films like The Brother from Another Planet, The Incredibles, and Attack the Block were an influence on the series while both show creators said that The Goonies and E.T. were further inspirations. The voice actors Ferguson, Swainn, Orji, and Alonso also supported a possible live-action adaptation of the series.

In March 2023, Kai Akari, a director for the series, told Animation Magazine that many of on the show's crew are "now treasured friends" and was grateful to have relationships with those Akari worked with previously "on other projects".

The second season premiered on August 17, 2023.

== Reception ==
The series received generally positive reviews from critics. The review aggregator website Rotten Tomatoes reported a 100% approval rating with an average rating of 8.1/10 based on six critics.

Megan Jordan of Rolling Stone argued that the series is an "Afrofuturist marvel" which tells a futuristic and relatable story that "center[s] Black characters while expanding the audience's imagination", provides thoughts of what the world could be "in true Black sci-fi fashion", and normalizes "Black heroism for future generations". Kenneth Seward Jr. of IGN described the series as a "delightfully charming, family-friendly space adventure" and an "action-packed romp through space" complete with corny moments, and "a slew of likable characters." He added that the series also hints at "various systemic issues" including forced labor, corrupt corporations, and the line between "willful ignorance and outright compliance". Max Gao of The A.V. Club described the series as an example of the "intergenerational appeal of high-quality animation", including callbacks and nods to "classic sci-fi films", and has a "positive portrayal of a loving Black family...and doesn't shy away from injecting bits of social commentary".

Karuna Sharma of Meaww described the series as setting the bar for "great animation and an even greater storyline", and praised the series for visualizing each emotion of the characters and called it a "great learning curve for children" who can see the show's world "in all its color and glory". Julie Sprankles of Scarry Mommy said that the series "channels the space adventure vibes from our childhoods", stated that the series is meaningful by "center[ing]...a Black family", and is grounded in "modern family dynamics". Diondra Brown of Common Sense Media described the series as "funny", with a "star-studded and diverse cast", and having some storylines with "mild violence and danger" but doesn't avoid "discussing important topics" and concluded it was an "absolutely fun watch for the whole family".

== Legacy ==
On May 28, 2026, My Dad the Bounty Hunter co-creator Patrick Harpin appeared as a contestant on the daytime television game show Let's Make a Deal.
