= Ye Olde Tavern (Iowa) =

- Interactive map of Ye Olde Tavern

Restaurant information
- Established: 1924
- Closed: 1974
- Food type: North American cuisine
- Location: 1322 Jackson Street, Sioux City, Iowa, United States
- Coordinates: 42.5049°N 96.4019°W

Ye Olde Tavern was a restaurant that specialized in tavern sandwiches located at the corner of 14th and Jackson streets in Sioux City, Iowa. The establishment was founded by John David ("Dave") Heglin, who is credited as one of the creators of the tavern sandwich.

== History ==
Dave Heglin opened the restaurant in 1920, he named the restaurant Ye Olde Tavern Inn (Heglin family archives). He sold loose ground beef sandwiches that he called tavern burgers. The recipe was closely guarded. The building was completed in 1928. After Heglin died, his wife sold the restaurant and the recipe for the tavern sandwich to Abe Kaled in 1934. He may have modified the formula for the tavern that he and his wife, Bertha Kaled, sold for a dime each, served in wax paper without a plate. Ye Olde Tavern was especially popular with students at nearby Central High School. The restaurant saw great success under the Kaled’s, and in 1952 they added a full menu. Taverns began to be sold in restaurants and bars across the Sioux City area and are now regarded as local specialty. The restaurant closed in 1974 because of Bertha’s failing health.

== Present ==
The restaurant was brought up on the radio broadcast A Way with Words on May 23, 2011, on the episode titled Pickles and Ice Cream.

The Ye Olde Tavern building has been home to multiple restaurants since 1974. In 2012, The Garden Cafe moved into the space and began selling a “Ye Olde Tavern” sandwich based on the original tavern recipe. In the September 2012 issue of Food Network Magazine, the publication named The Garden Cafe’s tavern the best sandwich in Iowa. The Garden Cafe closed in 2020, due to the retirement of the owner of the restaurant.
