= Maid-Rite Sandwich Shop (Springfield, Illinois) =

- U.S. National Register of Historic Places
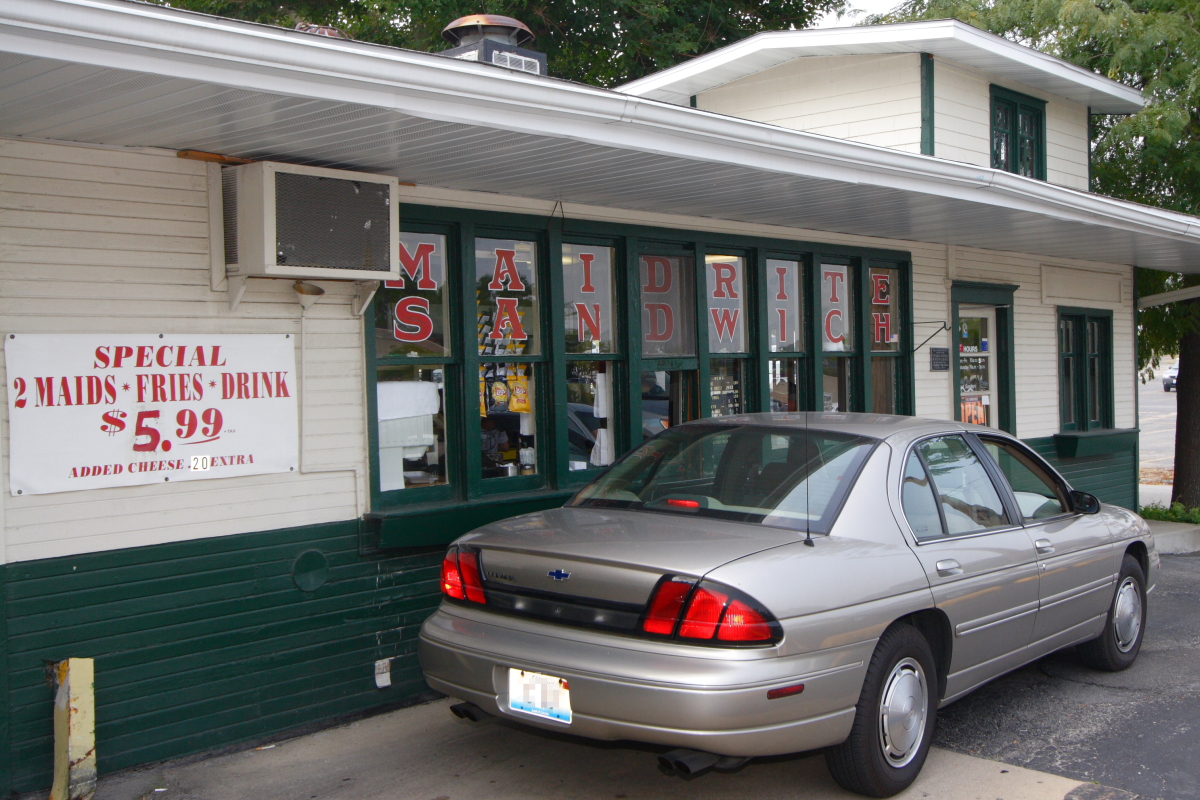

- Location within Illinois Location within the United States
- Location: 118 N. Pasfield St., Springfield, Illinois
- Coordinates: 39°48′6″N 89°39′30″W
- Area: less than one acre
- Built: 1921
- NRHP reference No.: 84001146
- Added to NRHP: August 16, 1984

The Maid-Rite Sandwich Shop in Springfield, Illinois, is one of the few remaining early Maid-Rite franchises in the United States. This specific shop, built in 1921, claims to have the first drive-thru window in the U.S. The building, along historic U.S. Route 66, was added to the National Register of Historic Places in 1984.
