= Maid-Rite =

American casual dining franchise restaurant chain

Maid-Rite Corporation
- Type: Private
- Industry: Restaurant
- Founded: 1926
- Founder: Fred Angell
- Headquarters: Ankeny, Iowa
- Website: www.maid-rite.com

Maid-Rite is an American casual dining franchise restaurant chain. Before it became a restaurant chain, it was a single restaurant, opened in 1926 by Fred Angell. By the end of the 1920s, four franchises were granted; these four restaurants are still in operation.

There is some conjecture about the first Maid-Rite, as the Maid-Rite in Springfield, IL states it was opened in 1924. This Maid-Rite is not listed as a franchise according to the company history or current locations. The Springfield, IL Maid-Rite also claims to be the first ever drive-through, and was built in a retired railroad caboose, which is still a part of their building as of April 2025.

Maid-Rite Corporation's CEO and president is Bradley L. Burt. The corporate headquarters are located in Des Moines, Iowa. As of August 2025, Maid-Rite had 25 locations in Iowa, Illinois, Minnesota, and Missouri. The Quincy, Illinois, location was featured in the Food Network show Feasting on Asphalt.

== History ==
Fred Angell was a butcher in Muscatine, Iowa, who combined a special cut and grind of meat with a selected set of spices and created the Maid-Rite sandwich, which is not a traditional hamburger. Rather, it is called a "loose meat" sandwich. While the component meat is similar, the Maid-Rite sandwich's meat is not formed into a patty, making it similar to a sloppy joe without the tomato-based sauce.

=== Restaurants ===
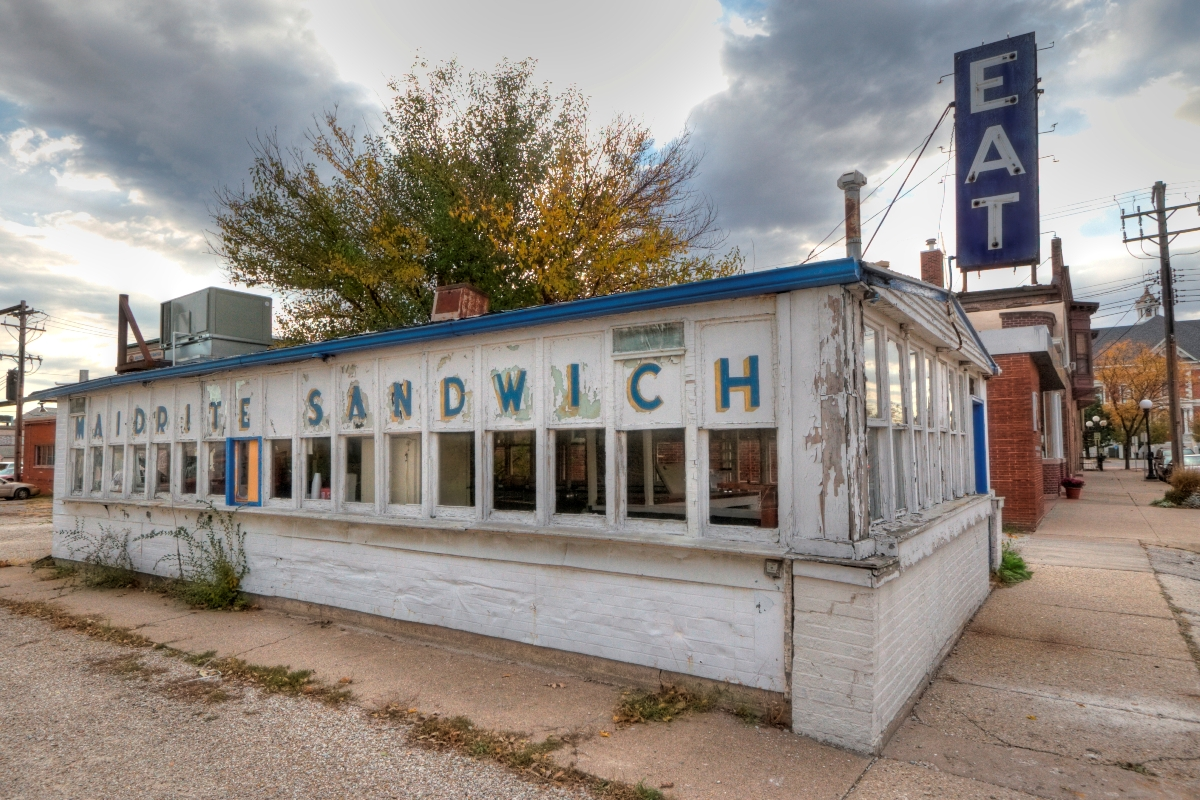
Shuttered store in Macomb, Illinois

Angell opened his first restaurant in Muscatine, which was strictly walk-up. Later, a new eat-in building was opened. He and his son, Francis Angell, opened a second restaurant, featuring a "car hop" or drive-in service. This was the first such service of this kind in the United States; A&W Restaurants and White Castle Restaurants replicated this service shortly thereafter.

The first franchise was opened in Durant, Iowa, which still maintains a Maid-Rite restaurant. Maid-Rite began to grow in the number of franchises throughout the United States under the direction of William Angell, the grandson of the founder.

== Sale ==
The Angell family had controlling interest in the franchise until 1984, when it was sold to a partnership of Clayton Blue, a farmer from Russell, Iowa, and John Gillotti, a contractor from Des Moines. (The original Maid-Rite restaurants in Muscatine were sold to Gary Kopf, a local businessman who also operated vending companies, family restaurants and bakeries.)

Blue had plans to expand the chain into a worldwide operation and sell stock to the public; however, after Blue defaulted on the contract to buy Maid-Rite, Gillotti purchased the chain outright in 1988. Gillotti died in 1991, prompting a legal battle between Blue's family and Gillotti's heirs over the chain's ownership. After the Polk County District Court issued an injunction in 1992 that prohibited any new Maid-Rite franchises, the court awarded the Gillotti family ownership of the 138-store chain in 1995. Issues with franchise fees and product quality led to a number of restaurants closing, however, and by 2002 the number of Maid-Rite stores had dropped to 83.

In 2002, an investor group led by former Des Moines banker Bradley Burt purchased a majority interest in the Maid-Rite chain, with the Gillotti family retaining an interest. While up to 20 longtime franchisees left Maid-Rite during the first two years of its new ownership, Maid-Rite began to use computerized systems to control expenses, started offering ten-day courses on Maid-Rite food preparation to new franchise owners, and created a new uniform decor for its restaurants that retains the Maid-Rite brand's nostalgia. In 2006, Maid-Rite had a ten-year plan to open more than 1,000 restaurants throughout the United States.

In November 2007, Maid-Rite announced an agreement with Hy-Vee Food Stores, a Midwest-based grocer, to operate restaurants in their stores. It came to naught.

As of August 2025, there are 14 locations in Iowa, and 11 locations in other states.

== See also ==
- Canteen Lunch in the Alley (Ottumwa, Iowa)
- Maid-Rite Sandwich Shop (Springfield, Illinois)
- Tavern sandwich
