= The Scenesters =

- Directed by: Todd Berger
- Written by: Todd Berger
- Produced by: Kevin M. Brennan; Jeff Grace; Brett D. Thompson
- Starring: Blaise Miller; Suzanne May; Jeff Grace; Kevin M. Brennan; Todd Berger; Sherilyn Fenn
- Cinematography: Helena Wei
- Edited by: Kyle Martin
- Music by: Dan Houlbrook
- Distributed by: monterey media inc.
- Release date: October 23, 2009
- Running time: 96 minutes
- Country: United States
- Language: English

The Scenesters is a 2009 art-house black comedy film written and directed by Todd Berger. The film was made by Los Angeles–based comedy group The Vacationeers and stars Blaise Miller, Suzanne May, Jeff Grace, Kevin M. Brennan, Todd Berger and Sherilyn Fenn. The film was shot in July 2008 in Los Angeles, California, United States, and premiered on October 23, 2009, at the 16th Annual Austin Film Festival.

== Premise ==
A group of crime scene videographers go after a serial killer.

== Cast ==
- Blaise Miller as Charlie Newton
- Suzanne May as Jewell Wright
- Jeff Grace as Roger Graham
- Kevin M. Brennan as Investigator Henry Muse
- Todd Berger as Wallace Cotten
- Monika Jolly as Investigator Carlita Travers
- James Jolly as Irving Shaw
- Sherilyn Fenn as A.D.A. Barbara Dietrichson
- John Landis as Judge Paxton B. Johnson
- Robert R. Shafer as George Porter

== Festivals ==
The Scenesters was selected to screen at the following film festivals:

- 2009 NewFilmmakers LA (August 31, 2009)
- 2009 Edmonton International Film Festival (October 2, 2009)
- 2009 New Orleans Film Festival (October 10, 2009)
- 2009 Austin Film Festival (October 23, 2009)
- 2009 Hollywood Film Festival (October 25, 2009)
- 2009 Lone Star International Film Festival (November 11, 2009)
- 2010 Slamdance Film Festival (January 22, 2010)
- 2010 Oxford Film Festival (February 6, 2010)
- 2010 Chicago International Movies and Music Festival (March 5, 2010)
- 2010 Lake County Film Festival (March 6, 2010)
- 2010 Phoenix Film Festival (April 9, 2010)
- 2010 Wisconsin Film Festival (April 16, 2010)

== Awards ==
Slamdance Film Festival
2010: won Most Interesting Film

Hollywood Film Festival
2009: won Hollywood Award for Best Comedy

Phoenix Film Festival
2010: won Best Screenplay

Edmonton International Film Festival
2009: won Rising Star Award for Best Director – Todd Berger

Blue Whiskey Independent Film Festival
2010: won Best of Fest
2010: won Best Screenplay
2010: won Best Director
2010: won Best Editor
2010: won Best Production Designer – Eve McCarney
2010: won Best Actor – Blaise Miller

== Reception ==
On Rotten Tomatoes the film has an approval rating of 43% based on reviews from 7 critics, with an average score of 4.67 out of 10.

Amy Handler from Film Threat called The Scenesters "a film that is provocative, intelligent, hilarious – and that moves so swiftly, that you're left gasping for more." Scott Ross from NBC New York said "'The Scenesters' is a gutsy experiment that rewards the viewer's knowledge of Los Angeles, movies and TV with a funny and engaging hyper-meta crime story." Nick W. from USA Today.com had wonderful things to say about the film saying "The Scenesters is the movie I keep telling my friends about. It's funny, inventive and unlike anything I've seen in long time". After the premier of The Scenesters at the Austin Film Festival Sean O'Neal from The A.V. Club praised the film saying it was "A genuinely suspenseful whodunit about a team of wannabe filmmakers exploiting a rash of L.A. murders targeting hipsters...The Scenesters is definitely, if dryly, funny in its satirical take on fame-seeking indie-rock types—boosted by a literally killer soundtrack". Todd Gilchrist from Fearnet called the film "A compelling whodunit that manages to pack more of a punch than the latest retro-noir murder mystery, The Scenesters is a satisfying, successful look at predators and prey, hipsters and Hollywood dreamers, and films and filmmakers that doesn't purely chase its own tail – and better yet, doesn't make moviegoers chase it either... destined to become a cult classic."

== See also ==
- 9/11 (2002 film)
