= It's a Disaster =

2012 American art-house film

- Film festival circuit poster
- Directed by: Todd Berger
- Written by: Todd Berger
- Produced by: Kevin M. Brennan; Jeff Grace; Gordon Bijelonic; Brett D. Thompson; Datari Turner
- Starring: Rachel Boston; Kevin M. Brennan; David Cross; America Ferrera; Jeff Grace; Erinn Hayes; Blaise Miller; Julia Stiles
- Cinematography: Nancy Schreiber, ASC
- Edited by: Franklin Peterson
- Music by: Chris Martins
- Production companies: Arms Entertainment; Midwinter Studios; Vacationeer Productions; Cactus Three; Tip Top Productions; Gordon Bijelonic/Datari Turner Films
- Distributed by: Oscilloscope Laboratories
- Release dates: June 20, 2012 (Los Angeles Film Festival); April 12, 2013 (United States)
- Running time: 88 minutes
- Country: United States
- Language: English
- Box office: $60,818

It's a Disaster is a 2012 American art-house black comedy film written and directed by Todd Berger. The film was made by Los Angeles-based comedy group The Vacationeers and stars Rachel Boston, David Cross, America Ferrera, Jeff Grace, Erinn Hayes, Kevin M. Brennan, Blaise Miller, Julia Stiles, and Todd Berger. The film premiered on June 20, 2012, at the Los Angeles Film Festival. It's a Disaster was commercially released in US theaters by Oscilloscope Laboratories, which acquired the US distribution rights to the film, on April 12, 2013.

== Plot ==
Four couples gather for a regular brunch which, over the years, has devolved into a gathering fraught with tension and awkwardness. One guest (Glenn) is meeting the others for the first time, on his third date with Tracey, the notoriously picky doctor in the group. As they settle into the afternoon (awaiting an "always late" fifth couple, Jenny and Gordon), they get to know the new member of the group and catch up on old times. When the men excuse themselves to watch football, they discover the TV, Internet, and landline phones are down. When the host, Pete, accuses his wife Emma of not paying the bills, their upcoming divorce is revealed to the guests.

After a neighbor, Hal, appears in a hazardous materials suit with news of dirty bombs exploding in major U.S. cities, including one 12 miles downtown from them, the couples begin to accept that a disaster has occurred. They split up to search the house for emergency supplies and air seal it with duct tape. Throughout the hunt, revelations of affairs arise between both hosts and another couple, Buck and Lexi, as are rejected sexual advances by the swinger couple toward Glenn, who rebuffs them.

Through a shower radio, they hear an automated public advisory that the bombs contained the VX nerve poison. The chemistry teacher, Hedy, in the group understands that because the attacks were chemical, only hours remain before a gruesome death for them all. After going into a trancelike shock, she breaks her silence by asking for Scotch. She later mixes up a batch of "poor man's ecstasy" from what she raided from a medicine cabinet, has an epiphany and calls off her six-year engagement to Shane. Her spirits lifted, she champions a musical session/"dance party" in the living room, accompanied by Lexi and Buck.

Her now-former fiancé is a comic book trader and bases his survival strategy on what he's learned from zombie films like Night of the Living Dead. After hearing of the bombs, he becomes highly suspicious of outsiders (including the new guy) and suggests others watch for bite marks or odd behavior, and they find weapons (like crowbars and chainsaws). He becomes concerned by the lack of life immediately outside the front window, so he questions the doctor guest about how quickly "mutations" should appear and spread. She explains how genetic mutation really works, with some disdain, but later agrees to not let the late fifth couple into the house when they finally arrive, with the pair visibly sick with something. While he seems more concerned by the woman's vague and rushed description of the situation outside, her decision to leave them is also partly punishment for always being late and for a past grievance between the two women over a man at a New Year's party.

Shane decides the best option is to leave the house and drive blindly until he either reaches fellow survivors or runs out of gas, having at least died trying. He asks if anyone's coming with him, and they all load into his SUV. However, the battery had been drained after leaving the vehicle on while listening to satellite radio, so it doesn't start.

The group eventually decides to stay home and have their meal as planned, enjoying what time they have. Glenn goes to the cellar to fetch wine, and is discovered by his date adding rat poison, sleeping pills, and muscle relaxants to it. He explains that he's a firm believer in The Last Judgment, this is likely that and he wants to save his new "non-believer" friends from experiencing the worst of the Great Tribulation. Convinced he's insane, she goes upstairs and tells the others, who express their doubt in his insanity and their belief in her tendency to overreact, after the wine is poured, but before they drink. Glenn calmly admits it, and gives his reasons. They're unconvinced but Hedy agrees their deaths would be easier this way, without the VX symptoms she details.

After some debate, they all agree to drink the poison together on the count of three. After one count, everyone only pretends to drink, including Glenn, who says he figured that might happen. They again ready themselves and finally tip the glasses back in unison. Again, they all fake it. Their fate is left unknown.

== Cast ==
- Rachel Boston as Lexi Kivel
- David Cross as Glenn Randolph
- America Ferrera as Hedy Galili
- Jeff Grace as Shane Owens
- Erinn Hayes as Emma Mandrake
- Kevin M. Brennan as Buck Kivel
- Blaise Miller as Pete Mandrake
- Julia Stiles as Tracy Scott
- Todd Berger as Hal Lousteau

== Poster ==
The film's festival-touring poster, which parodies a recruitment poster, has independently received critical acclaim and was named as one of the 12 best movie posters of 2012 by Film School Rejects. Oscilloscope Pictures is using an updated version of the same poster design, with the movie's film festival awards and a critic's quote added, for its commercial theatrical release.

== Festivals ==
It's a Disaster was selected to screen at the following film festivals:

- 2012 Los Angeles Film Festival (June 20, 2012) (world premiere)
- 2012 Edmonton International Film Festival (October 6, 2012)
- 2012 BendFilm Festival (October 12, 2012)
- 2012 New Orleans Film Festival (October 13, 2012)
- 2012 Friars Club Comedy Film Festival (October 24, 2012) (opening film)
- 2012 Virginia Film Festival (November 3, 2012)
- 2012 Lone Star International Film Festival (November 10, 2012)
- 2012 Napa Valley Film Festival (November 10, 2012)
- 2012 Tucson Loft Film Fest (November 12, 2012)
- 2012 Whistler Film Festival (December 2, 2012)
- 2013 RiverRun International Film Festival (April 13, 2013)

== Distribution ==
=== Oscilloscope and theatrical release ===
On August 23, 2012, Oscilloscope Laboratories announced that it had acquired North American distribution rights to It's a Disaster and that it planned both a theatrical and digital release of the film. Oscilloscope has since announced its planned release schedule for the film, with the film opening in New York and Los Angeles on April 12, 2013, with theatrical distribution expanding into additional markets beginning April 19, 2013. The movie earned $15,305, or $5,102 per theater, over its first weekend in limited release.

=== Vine release ===
On February 19, 2013, Oscilloscope announced that it would initially distribute It's a Disaster via the new mobile app Vine. Vine, a social networking app released by Twitter, Inc. on January 24, 2013, allows users to post video clips up to six seconds long, which then play in loop mode for viewers. A few hours after announcing the Vine distribution, described as a "stunt" and a "tongue in cheek experiment", Oscilloscope began tweeting links to 6-second-long chunks of the film each individually uploaded to Vine, thus making It's a Disaster the first film ever released on Vine.

The following day, Oscilloscope issued another tongue-in-cheek press release admitting they were wrong in expecting audiences to embrace watching films in six-second clips on their smartphones, and that they were abandoning plans to release future films on Vine.

=== iTunes and digital release ===
After the Vine release, Oscilloscope planned to release the film to more conventional digital and video on demand (VOD) services on March 5, 2013. On March 5, 2013, actor Blaise Miller and actress Julia Stiles used Twitter to announce the film's release on iTunes, Google Play, Amazon Video, and VOD.

== Reception ==
On the review aggregator website Rotten Tomatoes, 79% of 48 critics' reviews are positive, with an average rating of 6.3/10. The website's consensus reads: "A clever black comedy, It's a Disaster is sometimes uneven but the sharp writing and stellar ensemble cast keeps the film on track." Metacritic, which uses a weighted average, assigned the film a score of 57 out of 100, based on 17 critics, indicating "mixed or average" reviews.

== Awards ==
BendFilm Festival
2012: won Best Screenplay

Edmonton International Film Festival
2012: won Grand Jury Award for Best Feature - Audience Choice

New Orleans Film Festival
2012: won Audience Award for Best Picture
