= List of University of Texas at Austin alumni =

This list of University of Texas at Austin alumni includes notable graduates, non-graduate former students, and current students of the University of Texas at Austin. The institution is a major research university in Downtown Austin, Texas, US and is the flagship institution of the University of Texas System. Founded in 1883, the university has had the fifth largest single-campus enrollment in the nation as of Fall 2006 (and had the largest enrollment in the country from 1997 to 2003), with over 50,000 undergraduate and graduate students and 16,500 faculty and staff. It currently holds the second largest enrollment of all colleges in the state of Texas.

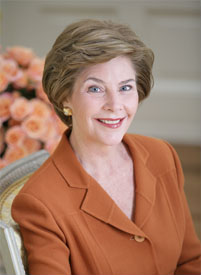
First Lady Laura Bush '73 received an MLS from UT Austin.

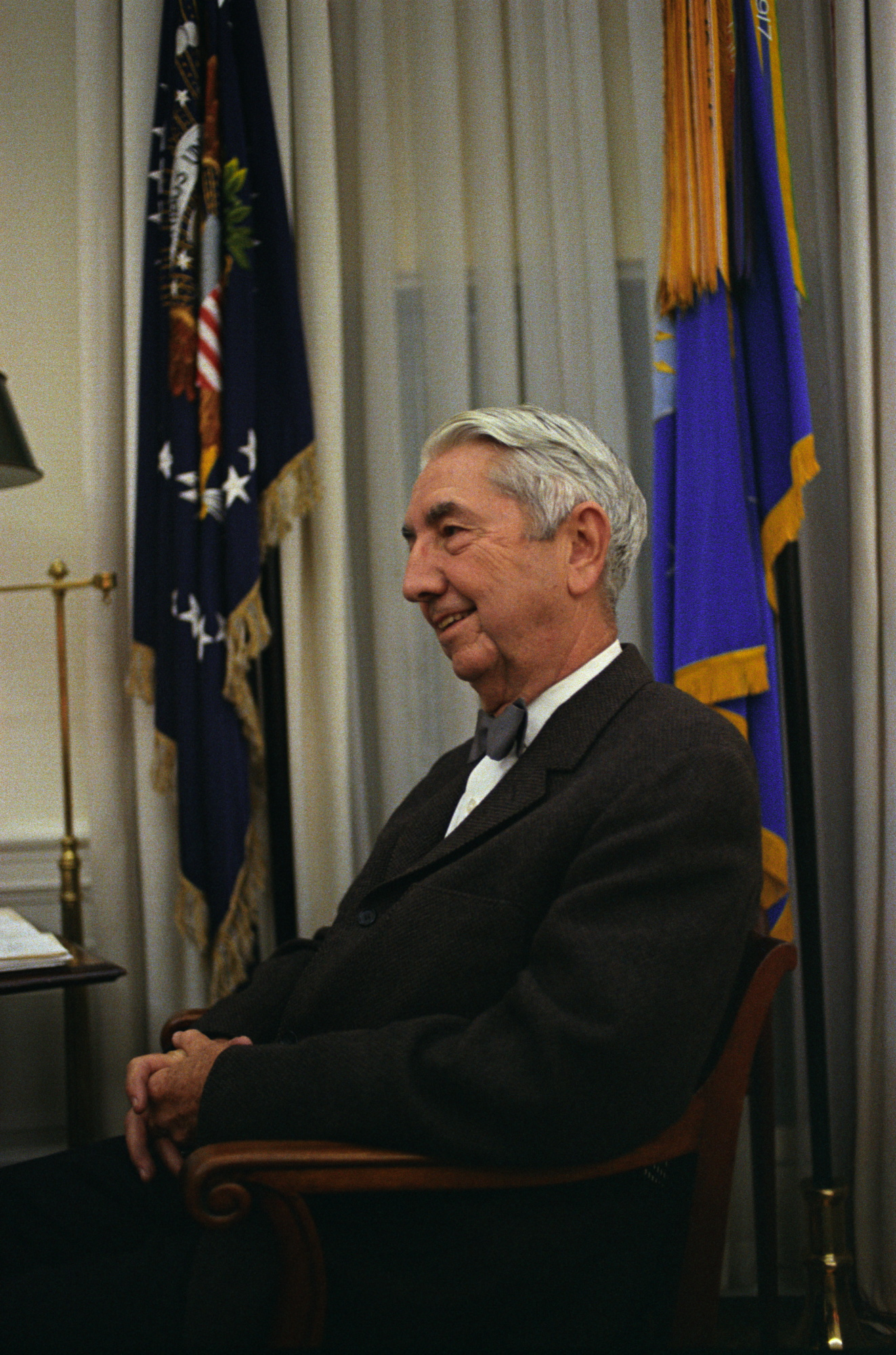
Tom C. Clark, '22, Associate Justice of the Supreme Court of the United States, received his J.D. from the University of Texas School of Law.

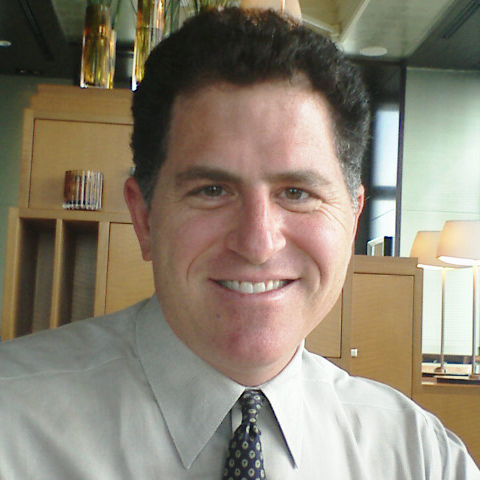
Michael Dell started PC's Limited (the precursor to Dell Computers) while at UT Austin.

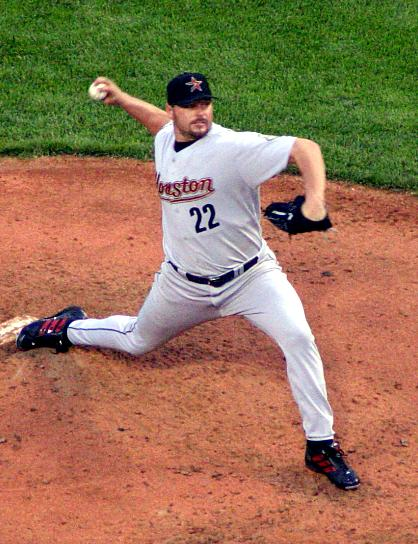
Alumnus Roger Clemens, MLB pitcher and seven-time Cy Young Award winner

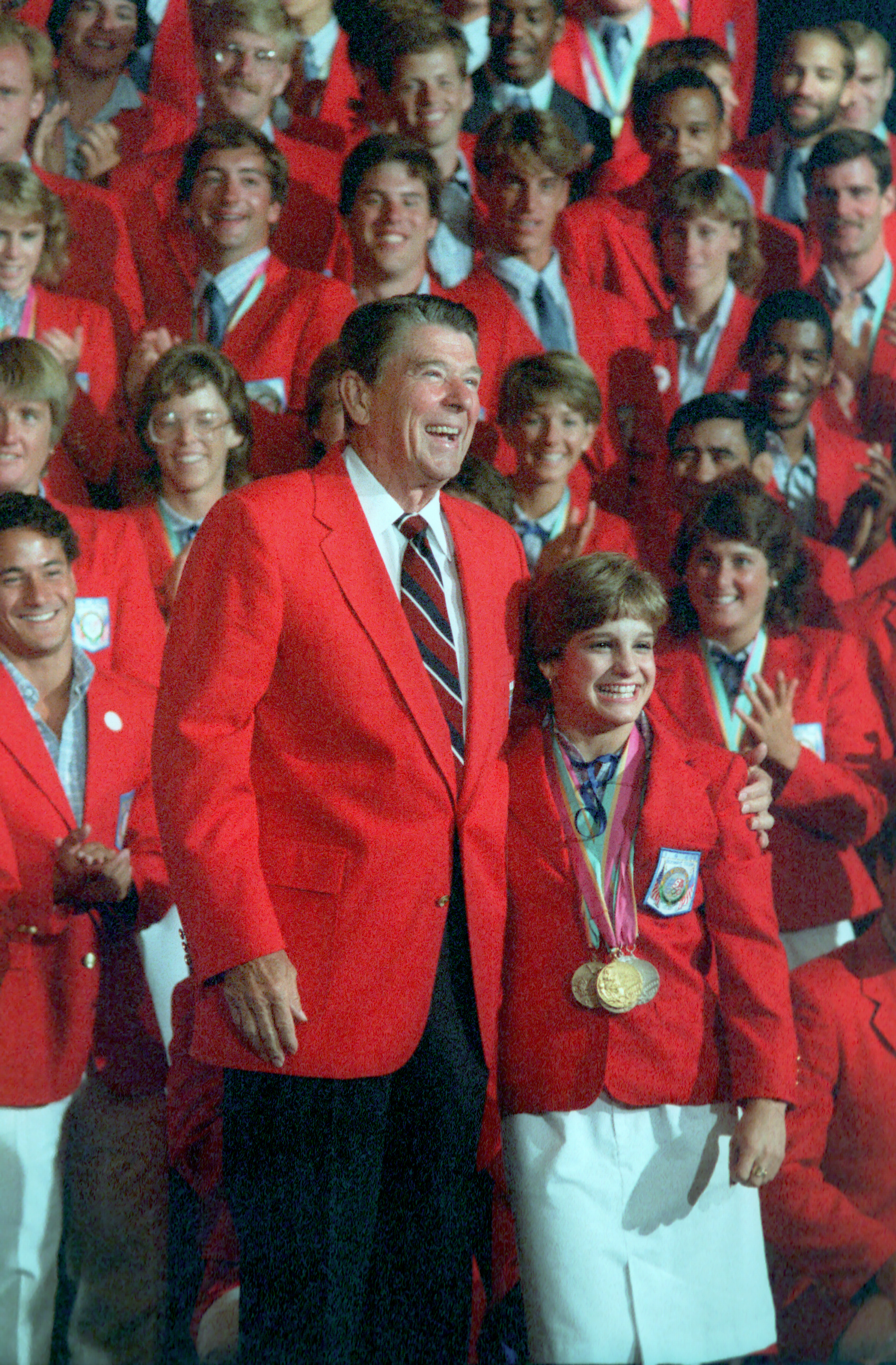
Alumna Mary Lou Retton (pictured with President Reagan) was the first non-European gymnast to win the all-around Olympic competition.

Over 30 UT Austin undergraduates have served in the U.S. Senate and U.S. House of Representatives, such as Lloyd Bentsen '42, who served as both a U.S. senator and U.S. representative, and was the 1988 Democratic Party vice presidential nominee. Tom C. Clark, J.D. '22, served as United States attorney general from 1945 to 1949 and as an associate justice of the Supreme Court of the United States from 1949 to 1967. Cabinet members of American presidents include former United States secretary of state Rex Tillerson '75, former United States secretary of state James Baker '57, former secretary of education William J. Bennett, and former secretary of commerce Donald Evans '73. First Lady Laura Bush '73 and daughter Jenna '04 both graduated from UT Austin, as well as former first lady Lady Bird Johnson '33 & '34 and her eldest daughter Lynda. In foreign governments, the university has been represented by Fernando Belaúnde Terry '36 (42nd president of Peru), and Abdullah al-Tariki (co-founder of OPEC).

UT Austin alumni in academia include the 26th president of the College of William & Mary Gene Nichol '76, the 10th president of Boston University Robert A. Brown '73 & '75, and the 8th president of the University of Southern California John R. Hubbard. The university also graduated Alan Bean '55, the fourth man to walk on the Moon. Additionally, alumni of the university who have served as business leaders include ExxonMobil Corporation former CEO Rex Tillerson '75, Dell founder and CEO Michael Dell, founder & CEO of Keyhole and pioneer of the successor Google Maps & Google Earth John Hanke, and CEO of Southwest Airlines Gary C. Kelly.

In literature and journalism, UT Austin has produced Pulitzer Prize winners Gail Caldwell and Ben Sargent '70, as well as CNN anchor Betty Nguyen '95. Alumnus J. M. Coetzee also received the 2003 Nobel Prize in Literature.

UT Austin has produced several musicians and entertainers. Janis Joplin, the singer who posthumously was inducted into the Rock and Roll Hall of Fame and received a Grammy Lifetime Achievement Award attended the university, as well as February 1955 Playboy Playmate of the Month and Golden Globe recipient Jayne Mansfield. Founding members of psychedelic rock band The Bright Light Social Hour Jackie O'Brien and Curtis Roush both received master's degrees from the university in 2009 while completing their debut self-titled album. The big screen has carried the talents of actor Matthew McConaughey '93 (star of The Wedding Planner (2001), How to Lose a Guy in 10 Days (2003), Sahara (2005), We Are Marshall (2007), et al.) with Farrah Fawcett (one of the original Charlie's Angels) on the small screen.

A number of UT Austin alumni have found success in professional sports. Seven-time Cy Young Award-winner Roger Clemens entered the MLB after helping the Longhorns win the 1983 College World Series. Professional basketball player and Olympic gold medalist Kevin Durant played one season with the Longhorns. Several Olympic medalists have also attended the school, including 2008 Summer Olympics athletes Ian Crocker '05 (swimming world record holder and two-time Olympic gold medalist) and 4 × 400 m relay defending Olympic gold medalist Sanya Richards '06. Mary Lou Retton (the first female gymnast outside Eastern Europe to win the Olympic all-around title, five-time Olympic medalist, and 1984 Sports Illustrated Sportswoman of the Year) also attended the university.

== Academia and research ==
=== University deans, chancellors, and presidents ===
Name	Class year(s)	Degree(s)	Notability	Reference
Paul R. Brown		MPA; PhD	Eighth president of Monmouth University	
Robert A. Brown	1973; 1975	BSc; MSc	Tenth president of Boston University	
Emily Cutrer		BA, MA, PhD	Fourth president of Texas A&M-Texarkana	
Ramón H. Dovalina	1984	PhD in Community College Leadership Program	Fifth president of Laredo Community College in Laredo, Texas, 1995–2007	
Pete Gallego	1985	JD	13th president of Sul Ross State University	
Leon A. Green	1915	LL.B.	Former dean at the Northwestern University School of Law	
Kent Hance	1968	JD	Third chancellor of the Texas Tech University System; former United States representative, Texas District 19	
Karen S. Haynes	1977	PhD	Social worker, president of University of Houston–Victoria and California State University San Marcos	
John R. Hubbard	1938; 1939; 1950	BA; MA; PhD	Historian, former president of the University of Southern California	
Farnam Jahanian		MA; PhD	Computer scientist, president of Carnegie Mellon University	
W. Page Keeton	1931	LL.M.	Former dean of the University of Texas School of Law	
Ramayya Krishnan		PhD	Dean of the Carnegie Mellon University Heinz College	
Charles T. McCormick	1909	BA	Law dean at University of North Carolina and UT; taught at Northwestern; wrote classic works on evidence and damages	
James Moeser	1961; 1964	B.Mus. M.Mus.	Ninth chancellor of the University of North Carolina at Chapel Hill	
John T. Montford	1965	BA	First chancellor of the Texas Tech University System, 1996–2001; member of the Texas State Senate from Lubbock 1983–1996; businessman in San Antonio since 2001	
Diana Natalicio	1969	PhD	President of the University of Texas at El Paso, 1988–2019	
Gene Nichol	1976	JD	Former president of the College of William and Mary; former dean of the law schools at both the University of North Carolina and the University of Colorado at Boulder	
Cristina Padolina		PhD	President and Chief Academic Officer, Centro Escolar University, Manila, Philippines	
Trudie Kibbe Reed		BSW, MSW	President of Philander Smith College, 1998–2004; president of Bethune–Cookman University, 2004–2012	
Ricardo Romo	1967	BSc	Fifth president of the University of Texas at San Antonio; U.S. representative to the United Nations Educational Scientific and Cultural Organization; member of the president's Board of Advisers on Historically Black Colleges and Universities	
M. David Rudd		PhD	Twentieth (and current) president of the University of Memphis	
Neal Smatresk	1980	PhD (Zoology and Marine Science)	16th president of University of North Texas; 9th president of University of Nevada, Las Vegas	

=== Professors, doctors and researchers ===
Name	Class year(s)	Degree(s)	Notability	Reference
James P. Allison	1969; 1973	BS; PhD	Nobel Prize-winning immunologist	
Jessie Andrews	1886	BA, MA	First woman graduate, first female faculty member (German), first female member of the alumni association; namesake of Andrews dormitory	
J. Michael Bailey	1989	PhD	Psychologist specialized in sexual orientation	
Amanda Bauer	2008	PhD	Astronomer and science communicator	
Alan Bean	1955	BSc	Astronaut, lunar module pilot on Apollo 12	
R.H. Bing	1935	BA	Mathematician	
Roger Birkman	1961	PhD	Psychologist specializing in self and social perception; creator of the Birkman Method assessment	
Charles Black	1935; 1938	BA; MA	Law professor at Columbia and Yale; pioneer in civil rights litigation; author of leading treatise on the law of admiralty	
Elizabeth Hill Boone	1974; 1977	MA; PhD	Order of the Aztec Eagle medal recipient for work in Mesoamerican art history	
Barbara Hyde Bowman	1958	PhD	Geneticist, University of Texas Medical Branch in Galveston and University of Texas Health Science Center; president of the American Society of Human Genetics	
Robert S. Boyer	1967	BA	Computer scientist, co-inventor of the Boyer–Moore string-search algorithm	
Lillian K. Bradley	1960	PhD	Associate professor at Texas Southern University; first African-American woman to earn a doctorate at the University of Texas at Austin	
Michael Brame	1966	BA	Professor of Linguistics at the University of Washington	
Yaron Brook	1989; 1994	MBA; PhD	Former finance professor, Santa Clara University; president and executive director, Ayn Rand Institute	
Brené Brown		B.SW.	Research professor at University of Houston Graduate College of Social Work	
Adi Bulsara	1978	PhD	Physicist, leader in nonlinear dynamics, PhD student of Ilya Prigogine	
Karen Butler-Purry	1987	MS	Professor, Texas A&M University Department of Electrical and Computer Engineering	
Elsa Salazar Cade	1968; 1973	BSc; MA	Science educator and entomologist	
Robert Cade	1950; 1961	BA; PhD	Inventor of sports drink Gatorade	
William H. Cade	1968; 1972; 1976	BA; MA; PhD	Animal behaviorist, president of the University of Lethbridge	
Ken Castleman	1965; 1967; 1970	BSc; MSc; PhD	Author of the textbook Digital Image Processing, president of Advanced Digital Imaging Research	
Almadena Chtchelkanova	1996	MA	Developed and implemented portable, scalable, parallel adaptive mesh generation algorithms for computational fluid dynamics, weather forecast, combustion and contaminant transport	
Christina Cogdell	1991; 2001	BA; PhD	Professor of Design, University of California, Davis	
Robert Crippen	1960	BSc	Pilot of STS-1, first orbital test flight of NASA Shuttle program	
Mohammed Dajani Daoudi		MSc	Palestinian professor and peace activist	
Leonard Eugene Dickson	1893; 1894	BSc; MSc	Mathematician	
E. Allen Emerson	1976	BSc	Computer scientist, A. M. Turing Award	
Joe Bertram Frantz		BA; MA; PhD	Historian of the United States, the American West, and Texas	
O. H. Frazier	1963	BA	Heart surgeon	
Jinlong Gong	2008	PhD	Chinese chemist	
Hector Hugo Gonzalez	1974	PhD	Nurse educator	
Gordon Gunter	1931; 1945	MA; PhD	Influential fisheries scientist who pioneered the study of fisheries in the northern Gulf of Mexico	
Laura M. Haas	1981	PhD	Computer scientist; created systems for data and mapping technology	
Peter Bacon Hales	1976; 1980	MA; PhD	Chair and professor of Art History at the University of Illinois at Chicago; historian and photographer specializing in contemporary art, American spaces and landscapes	
Kevin Hannan	1977	MA	Ethnolinguist	
Elise F. Harmon	early 1940s	MS	Chemist, physicist; major contributor to the miniaturization of computers	
John Haynes, Jr.		Medical Degree	Family physician and surgeon	
Eamonn Healy	1984	PhD	Professor of chemistry at St. Edward's University	
George Holden		MA and PhD	Professor at Southern Methodist University	
William Curry Holden	1923; 1928	BA; MA; PhD	Historian, archaeologist, first director of the Museum of Texas Tech University in Lubbock	
Nancy B. Jackson	1990	PhD	Chemist, former president of the American Chemical Society	
Niu Jingyi	1953	PhD	Chinese biochemist, the first citizen of the People's Republic of China to be nominated for the Nobel Prize in 1979	
F. Burton Jones	1935	PhD	Mathematician	
Theresa A. Jones	1992	PhD	Professor of neuroscience at University of Texas at Austin	
Persis Karim	1998	PhD	Professor of comparative literature, director of the Center for Iranian Diaspora Studies at San Francisco State University	
V.O. Key, Jr.	1929; 1930	BA; MA	Political scientist; studied elections and voting behavior; taught at UCLA; professor at Johns Hopkins University; Alfred Cowles Professor of Government at Yale University; Jonathan Trumbull Professor of American History and Government at Harvard University	
Lauren Krivo	1980 1984	MA PhD	Professor of Sociology at Rutgers University	
Hallie Lieberman		MA	Sex and gender historian	
Phil Ligrani	1974	BS	Professor of mechanical and aerospace Engineering at the University of Alabama in Huntsville	
Alan Lomax		BA	Musicologist and folklorist; son of John Avery Lomax	
John Avery Lomax	1908	BA	Pioneering musicologist and folklorist	
Steve Madere		MSc	Computer scientist, founded Deja News	
Gordon Eugene Martin	1966	PhD	Pioneering piezoelectric materials researcher for underwater sound transducers	
Roscoe C. Martin	1924; 1925	BA, MA	Professor of political science and pioneer of academic discipline of public administration	
Forrest McDonald	1949; 1955	BA; MA; PhD	Historian, 1987 Jefferson Lecturer	
Garnie W. McGinty		PhD	Historian, Louisiana Redeemed: The Overthrow of Carpetbag Rule, 1876–1880, college president	
Jeffrey L. Meikle	1977	PhD	Stiles Professor in American Studies Emeritus at the University of Texas at Austin	
Kenneth Merz	1985	PhD	Joseph Zichis Chair and professor at Michigan State University; editor-in-chief of American Chemical Society's Journal of Chemical Information and Modeling	
Uta Merzbach	1952; 1954	BA; MA	Historian of mathematics; first curator of mathematical instruments at the Smithsonian Institution	
J. Morgan Micheletti	2010	BSc	Ophthalmologist, researcher, inventor, Outstanding Young Texas Ex Award winner	
Maggie Miller	2015	BA	Mathematician researching Low-dimensional topology at UT Austin; received the 2023 Maryam Mirzakhani New Frontiers Prize	
Robert Lee Moore	1901	BSc	Mathematician	
Nancy A. Moran	1976	BA	Evolutionary biologist and entomologist, University of Texas Leslie Surginer Endowed Professor, and co-founder of the Yale Microbial Diversity Institute	
Sarafina Nance	2016	BSc (Physics)	Science communicator, astrophysics researcher	
Rishikesh Narayanan	2004	Post-doc	Neuroscientist at Indian Institute of Science; author; Shanti Swarup Bhatnagar laureate	
Donna Nelson	1980	PhD	Chemistry professor; Nelson Diversity Surveys author; scientific workforce scholar	
Robin Neumayer	2017	PhD	Mathematician	
Lisa Piccirillo	2019	PhD	Mathematician; solved the Conway Knot Problem	
Ben H. Procter	1940s	BA; MA	Historian at Texas Christian University 1957–2000	
Coke Reed	1962; 1965; 1966	BSc; MSc; PhD	Mathematician, inventor of Data Vortex	
Jacy Reese Anthis	2015	BSc	Social scientist, author of The End of Animal Farming	
Mary Ellen Rudin	1944; 1949	BA; PhD	Mathematician	
H. Grady Rylander	1943	BSME; PhD	Professor of Mechanical Engineering; director of Center for Electromechanics	
Christine E. Schmidt	1988	BS	Biomedical engineer, nerve graft inventor, and professor at University of Florida	
Tom Shires	1944	BSc	Trauma surgeon	
Robert Slocum	1981	PhD	Professor of botany and biology at Goucher College	
Bette Talvacchia	1975	MA	Board of Trustees Distinguished Professor of Art History Emeritus at the University of Connecticut	
Don Thomas	1941; 1943	BA; MA	Nobel Prize in physiology or medicine	
Beatrice Tinsley	1964	PhD	Astronomer	
Neil deGrasse Tyson	1983	MA	Astrophysicist	
Irma Alicia Velásquez Nimatuj	2005	PhD	Guatemalan Mayan social anthropologist	
Jennifer Walden		BA	Plastic surgeon, researcher, and co-author of Aesthetic Plastic Surgery Textbook	
Walter Prescott Webb	1915	BA	Historian and author of the Handbook of Texas	
Michael Webber	1995	BSc; BA	Mechanical engineer and public speaker on energy policy	
Spencer Wells	1988	BSc	Geneticist and anthropologist	
Elizabeth H. West	1901	BA	Librarian; first woman to head the Texas State Library; first librarian of Texas Tech University; co-founder and first president of the Southwestern Library Association	
Amelia Worthington Williams	1926, 1931	BA MA Ph.D.	Texas historian	
Stephanie Wilson	1992	MSc	Astronaut, mission specialist on Space Shuttle mission STS-121	

== NASA ==
Name	Class year(s)	Degree(s)	Notability	Reference
Michael A. Baker	1975	BSc		
Alan Bean	1955	BSc	Fourth person to walk on the Moon as a lunar module pilot on the Apollo 12 mission	
Kenneth Cockrell	1972	BSc		
Robert L. Crippen	1960	BSc		
Frederick W. Leslie	1974	BSc		
Paul S. Lockhart	1981	MS		
Carl J. Meade	1973	BSc		
Andreas Mogensen	2008	PhD		
Frances "Poppy" Northcutt	1965	BSc	First female Mission Control engineer	
Karen Nyberg	1996	MS		
Stephanie D. Wilson	1992	MS		
Neil Woodward	1988	MA		

== Business and finance ==
Name	Class year(s)	Degree(s)	Notability	Reference
Moulay Abdallah ben Ali Alaoui	1989	BA	Alaouite prince, advisor of King Mohammed VI and president of energy company Mediholding SA	
Bud Brigham	1983	BSc in geophysics	Billionaire oil and gas developer	
William Buckley, Sr.	1904; 1905	BSc; LL.B.	Oil speculator and political activist; father of William F. Buckley, Jr.	
Leon Chen	1997; 2001	BBA	Co-founder of Tiff's Treats	
Tiffany Chen (née Taylor)	1997; 2001	BS	Co-founder of Tiff's Treats	
Robert H. Dedman, Jr.	1979	BA	Chairman of ClubCorp	
Michael Dell	1983; 1984	(never graduated)	Founder of Dell Computers	
David Geffen		(never graduated)	Co-founder of DreamWorks Animation; founder of Asylum Records and Geffen Records	
Bill Gurley	1993	MBA (McCombs)	General partner at Benchmark Capital	
John Hanke	1989	BA (Plan II)	Co-founder of Keyhole; manager of the Google successor programs Google Maps and Google Earth	
Tom Hicks	1968	BBA (McCombs)	Former owner of the Texas Rangers	
Jeffrey Hildebrand	1981; 1985	BSc; MSc	Chairman and CEO of Hilcorp; 56th richest American	
William R. Johnson	1974	MBA (McCombs)	CEO of H.J. Heinz Co.	
Gary C. Kelly	1974	BBA (McCombs)	CEO of Southwest Airlines	
Duy-Loan Le	1982	BSE	Engineer; first woman and Asian elected Texas Instruments Senior Fellow	
Austin Ligon	1973; 1978	BA (Plan II); MA (Economics)	Co-founder and retired CEO, CarMax	
Red McCombs		MBA (McCombs); JD	Co-founder of Clear Channel Communications; former co-owner of the San Antonio Spurs, Denver Nuggets, and Minnesota Vikings	
Robert McGehee	1972	JD	CEO of Progress Energy	
Cal McNair			Chairman and CEO of the Houston Texans NFL franchise	
James Mulva	1968; 1969	BSc (McCombs); MBA (McCombs)	CEO of ConocoPhillips	
Bill Noël	1935	BBA	Oil industrialist, banker, philanthropist from Odessa	
William C. Nowlin	1972; 1979	BSc (Cockrell); MSc (Cockrell)	Co-founder of National Instruments	
Mandy Price			Attorney, co-founder and CEO of Kanarys	
Corbin J. Robertson	1969		CEO of Natural Resource Partners	
Thomas L. Ryan	1987	BBA (McCombs)	CEO of Service Corporation International, a Fortune 1,000 company	
Tex Schramm	1947	BA	Former Dallas Cowboys general manager; Pro Football Hall of Fame member	
Stacy H. Schusterman		MBA	Chairman and CEO of Samson Energy; philanthropist	
George Seay	1989, 1998	BA, MBA (McCombs)	Businessman, co-founder and CEO of Annandale Capital, philanthropist and conservative political activist	
Roy Spence	1971	BA	Co-founder of national advertising agency GSD&M	
Rex Tillerson	1975	BSc	Former chairman and CEO of ExxonMobil, and former secretary of state in the first Donald Trump administration	
James Truchard	1964; 1967; 1974	BSc; MA; PhD	Electrical engineer, co-founder, president, and chairman of the board of National Instruments	
James Marion West, Jr.		JD	Oilman, lumber mill owner, and rancher; considered the archetype of the Texas oilman	
Graham Whaling	1976	BSc	Petroleum engineer and managing partner of Parkman Whaling LLC	
C. John Wilder	1974	BBA (McCombs)	Former CEO of TXU, a Fortune 1,000 energy holdings company	
Angus G. Wynne	1938	BA	Founder of Six Flags	
Bedford Wynne			Co-founder of the Dallas Cowboys	
Peter Zandan	1983	PhD, MBA (McCombs)	Global vice chairman, Hill+Knowlton Strategies; founder of Intelliquest, Zilliant; Austin community figure	

== Entertainment ==
=== Film and stage ===
==== Actors ====
Name	Class year(s)	Degree(s)	Notability	Reference
F. Murray Abraham		(never graduated)	Actor who won Academy Award for role in Amadeus	
Fahad Albutairi	2007	BS	Saudi Arabian actor and stand-up comedian	
Kevin Alejandro			Actor featured in Ugly Betty	
Barbara Barrie	1952	BA	Broadway, film and television actress, Academy Award nomination for Breaking Away and Best Actress Award at Cannes Film Festival for One Potato, Two Potato	
Steve Barton		(never graduated)	Broadway actor	
Florence Bates	1906	BSc	Character actress	
Gail Davis		BA	Actress, starred in 1950s syndicated western television series Annie Oakley	
Felicia Day	1998	BSc	Actress (Buffy the Vampire Slayer), writer and producer	
Deanna Dunagan		BME	Stage, television, and film actress who won the Tony Award for Best Actress in a Play in 2008 for her portrayal of Violet Weston in August: Osage County	
Farrah Fawcett		(never graduated)	Actress, star of films and original Charlie's Angels television series	
Peri Gilpin		(never graduated)	Actress, starred as Roz Doyle on TV series Frasier	
Jon Hamm		(never graduated)	Actor, starred as Don Draper on TV series Mad Men	
Marcia Gay Harden	1980	BA	Actress who won Academy Award for role in Pollock, nominated for role in Mystic River; also Tony Award winner for God of Carnage	
John Hillerman		(never graduated)	Actor who won Golden Globe and Emmy Award for role in Magnum, P.I.	
Pat Hingle	1949	BA	Actor who appeared in numerous TV shows and films such as On the Waterfront, Hang 'Em High, and Batman and its three sequels	
Susan Howard		(never graduated)	Actress, played Donna Culver Krebbs on soap opera Dallas	
Jonathan Islas	2001	BA	Telenovela actor	
L. Q. Jones	1950		Prolific actor and producer in Westerns	
Todd Lowe	1999	BA	Actor on True Blood and Gilmore Girls	
Allen Ludden	1940; 1941	BA; MA	Daytime Emmy Award winner for work as Password host, Peabody Award winner for Mind Your Manners	
Jayne Mansfield		(never graduated)	Actress, film star who won Theatre World Award and Golden Globe; mother of Mariska Hargitay	
Chase Masterson		BFA	Actress, Star Trek: Deep Space Nine, Yesterday Was a Lie	
Matthew McConaughey	1993	BSc	Actor, film star who won Academy Award for role in Dallas Buyers Club	
Bruce McGill	1973	BFA	Actor in films such as Animal House, My Cousin Vinny, The Insider, Cinderella Man, Collateral, Lincoln and many other film and television roles	
Lindsey Morgan	2012	BA	Actress in The CW television series The 100	
Fess Parker	1950	BA	Actor, television star who played Davy Crockett and Daniel Boone	
Fred Parker Jr.	2003	BA	Actor, appeared in The Best Man and I Saw the Light	
Ashmit Patel	2000	BFA	Bollywood actor	
Glen Powell	2011	(never graduated)	Actor, Top Gun: Maverick, Set It Up, The Dark Knight Rises, Scream Queens	
Chris Rich	1970	MA	Actor, played Brock Hart on TV series Reba	
Trevante Rhodes	2012	BSc	Actor, featured in Moonlight, Bird Box, and The Predator	
Tex Ritter		(never graduated)	Actor and singer in Westerns; father of John Ritter	
Jason Saldaña	2001	BSc	Voice actor, Tucker in Red vs. Blue	
Eli Wallach	1936	BA	Actor, featured in such films as The Magnificent Seven, The Godfather, Part III and The Good, the Bad and the Ugly; Emmy, Tony and honorary Academy Award winner	
Noël Wells	2010	B.S.RTF	Actor, known for her television roles on Master of None and Saturday Night Live, as well as writing, directing, and starring in the film Mr. Roosevelt	
Owen Wilson	1991	BA	Actor, screenwriter and producer, featured in such films as Wedding Crashers, Zoolander, Meet the Parents and Cars	
Renée Zellweger	1992	BA	Actress, film star who won Academy Award for role in Cold Mountain and was nominated for roles in Bridget Jones's Diary and Chicago	

==== Directors, producers, and writers ====
Name	Class year(s)	Degree(s)	Notability	Reference
Wes Anderson	1990	BA	Filmmaker who was nominated for Academy Awards for The Royal Tenenbaums, Fantastic Mr. Fox, Moonrise Kingdom, and The Grand Budapest Hotel	
Michael "Burnie" Burns	1997	BA	Actor, writer, film producer, film director; co-founder and former CEO of Rooster Teeth	
Thonnis Calhoun	1950	BFA	Writer of plays, radio, and television shows	
Joan Darling		(Attended 1955–56, her junior year; did not graduate)	Director, First Love and "Chuckles Bites the Dust"	
Mark Dennis	2007	BSc	Award-winning filmmaker, Strings	
Jay Duplass		MFA	Film director, producer and screenwriter; with brother Mark, half of the "Duplass Brothers"	
Mark Duplass	1999	BA	Film director, producer and screenwriter, actor, musician; with brother Jay, half of the "Duplass Brothers"	
Ben Foster	2008	BSc	Award-winning filmmaker, Strings	
Henry Gayden	2002	BA	Screenwriter, Earth to Echo, Shazam! and There's Someone Inside Your House	
Kovid Gupta	2010	BBA, BS, BA	Screenwriter, known for Indian television shows Balika Vadhu and Bade Achhe Lagte Hain; author of Kingdom of The Soap Queen: The Story of Balaji Telefilms	
Matt Hullum	1997	BSc	Actor, film producer, film director, visual effects supervisor; co-founder and current CEO of Rooster Teeth	
Abhijat Joshi	2002	MFA	Screenwriter best known for work in Lage Raho Munnabhai (fifth highest-grossing Bollywood film)	
Bernard Lechowick	1971	MFA	Award-winning television show runner, writer and producer of Knots Landing, creator of Homefront, Second Chances, and Hotel Malibu	
Richard Linklater		(never graduated)	Academy Award-nominated film director and screenwriter, Dazed and Confused, School of Rock, Before Sunset, Bad News Bears, and Boyhood	
Tim McCanlies		(transferred to Texas A&M)	Writer and director of Secondhand Lions	
Pamela Ribon	1997	BFA	Academy Award-nominated writer, producer, and performer, My Year of Dicks, Moana, Nimona, Ralph Breaks the Internet.	
Robert Rodríguez	2008	BA	Mexican American filmmaker, director of Spy Kids, Sin City, From Dusk till Dawn; studied at University of Texas at Austin College of Communication	
Robert Schenkkan		BA (Plan II)	Playwright and screenwriter, 1992 Pulitzer Prize for Drama (The Kentucky Cycle)	
Thomas Schlamme		BA	Television and film director and producer	
Harvey Schmidt	1940		Writer of musical theatre; wrote lyrics for musicals The Fantasticks, 110 in the Shade, I Do! I Do!, Celebration	
Hark Tsui	1975	BSc (at RTF)	Hong Kong film producer and film director, major figure of the Golden Age of Hong Kong cinema	
Tommy Tune	1962	BA	Broadway choreographer, dancer, stage and film actor	
Gary Winick	1970	MFA	Director, producer, 13 Going on 30, Bride Wars	

=== Music ===
Name	Class year(s)	Degree(s)	Notability	Reference
Anike	2018		Formerly known as Wande; rapper and A&R administrator	
Troy Coleman	1993	BA	Singer of country rap known as "Cowboy Troy", co-host of Nashville Star	
Jack Cooper	1999	DMA	Composer and arranger: U.S. Army Jazz Knights, Aaron Neville, Berlin Jazz Orchestra, Memphis Symphony Orchestra, and TV shows Deal or No Deal, The Jenny Jones Show, American Restoration and Access Hollywood	
Britt Daniel	1993	B.S.RTF	Indie-rock musician, lead singer of Spoon	
Sarah Dougher	1997	MA; PhD	Indie-rock musician	
Mary Dunleavy	1990	M.Mus.	Opera singer	
Kinky Friedman	1966	BA	Singer and author	
Nanci Griffith		BA	Winner of 1994 Grammy Award for Best Contemporary Folk Album	
Janis Joplin		(never graduated)	Singer; posthumously inducted into the Rock and Roll Hall of Fame and received a Grammy Lifetime Achievement Award	
Jerry Junkin	1978	BM, MM	Director of Bands at University of Texas Austin, Head of the Conducting Division, Music Director and Conductor of the Dallas Winds and the Hong Kong Wind Philharmonia, Principal Guest Conductor of the Senzoku Gakuen College of Music Wind Symphony	
Sarah Lipstate	2006		Guitarist and composer performs under the name Noveller	
Lotic	2012	BSc	Electronic musician	
Ray Lynch	1967	B.Mus.	Billboard Award-winning classical guitarist and lutenist	
Sterling Morrison	1971	PhD	Founding member of rock band The Velvet Underground	
Phillip Sandifer	1982	BA	Christian music songwriter and musician	
Harriet Schock	1962	BA	Singer-songwriter	
Michelle Shocked	1983	BSc	Protest-music writer and performer	
Nikki Stringfield	2012	BSc	Guitarist for The Iron Maidens; former guitarist for Before the Mourning	
Sloan Struble	2022	(never graduated)	Singer, songwriter, and producer; founder and lead of the indie pop project Dayglow	
Brent Watkins	2005; 2008	MM; DMA	Pianist and owner of Jazz, TX in San Antonio	
Cindy Yen	2008	BM, BA, BAJ	Singer, songwriter, producer, dancer, actress based in Taiwan	

=== Comics and cartooning ===
Name	Class year(s)	Degree(s)	Notability	Reference
Berkeley Breathed	1979	BSc	Author of comic strip Bloom County	
Roy Crane	1922	BA	"Father of the adventure story cartoon strip"; author of syndicated Buz Sawyer	
Charles Fincher	1968	BSc	Cartoonist (Thadeus & Weez, The Daily Scribble), lawyer	
Ben Sargent	1970	BA	Pulitzer Prize-winning editorial cartoonist, Austin American-Statesman (1974–2009)	

== Government, law, and public policy ==
=== U.S. presidential family members ===
Name	Class year(s)	Degree(s)	Notability	Reference
Jenna Bush	2004	BA	Daughter of President George W. Bush	
Laura Bush	1973	MLS	Former first lady of the United States	
Lady Bird Johnson	1933	BA	Former first lady of the United States; recipient of the Presidential Medal of Freedom and the Congressional Gold Medal	
Lynda Bird Johnson Robb	1966	BA	Eldest daughter of Lyndon B. Johnson; former first lady of Virginia	

=== Justices of the Supreme Court of the United States ===
Name	Class year(s)	Degree(s)	Notability	Reference
Tom C. Clark	1922	JD	Former associate justice of the Supreme Court of the United States	

=== Justices of state supreme courts ===
Name	Class year(s)	Degree(s)	Notability	Reference
Joseph M. Watt	1972	JD	Chief justice, Oklahoma Supreme Court	

=== Federal judges ===
Name	Class year(s)	Degree(s)	Notability	Reference
William C. Conner	1941; 1942	BBA; LL.B.	Federal judge for the United States District Court for the Southern District of New York	
Randy Crane	1985; 1987	BA; JD	Federal judge for the United States District Court for the Southern District of Texas	
Ricardo Hinojosa	1972	BA	Chief judge for the United States District Court for the Southern District of Texas; former chair of the United States Sentencing Commission	
William Wayne Justice	1942	BA; JD	Federal judge for the Eastern District of Texas and the United States District Court for the Western District of Texas	
Royce Lamberth	1965; 1967	BA; LL.B.	Federal judge for the United States District Court for the District of Columbia	
Natasha C. Merle	2005	BA	Federal judge for the United States District Court for the Eastern District of New York	
Barefoot Sanders	1949; 1950	BA; JD	Federal judge for the United States District Court for the Northern District of Texas	
Diane Pamela Wood	1971; 1975	BA; JD	Chief judge of the United States Court of Appeals for the Seventh Circuit; senior lecturer at the University of Chicago Law School	

=== Members of the United States Congress ===
Note: "D" indicates a Democrat while "R" indicates a Republican.

==== Senators ====
Name	Class year(s)	Degree(s)	Notability	Reference
Lloyd Bentsen	1942	JD	Former senator (D) from Texas	
Tom Connally	1898	JD	Former representative and senator (D) from Texas	
Kay Bailey Hutchison	1962; 1967	BA; JD	Former United States senator (R) from Texas (1993–2013)	
Earle Bradford Mayfield	1900; 1901	JD	Former United States senator from Texas (1923–1929)	
Ralph Yarborough	1927	JD	Former United States senator from Texas (1957–1971)	

==== Representatives ====
Name	Class year(s)	Degree(s)	Notability	Reference
Michael A. Andrews	1967	BA	Former representative (D) from Texas' 3rd congressional district	
William R. Archer	1946; 1951	BA; LL.B	United States representative from Texas (1971–2001)	
Steve Bartlett	1971	BA	Former member of the U.S. House of Representatives (1983–1991)	
James Andrew Beall	1890	JD	Former member of the U.S. House of Representatives (1903–1925)	
Chris Bell	1982	BJ	Former member of the U.S. House of Representatives (2003–2005)	
John Junior Bell	1932; 1936	College; JD	Former member of the U.S. House of Representatives (1955–1957)	
Lloyd Bentsen	1942	JD	U.S. representative (1948–1955), U.S. senator (1970–1992), U.S. vice presidential candidate (1988), and secretary of the treasury under President Bill Clinton	
Thomas Lindsay Blanton	1897	JD	Former member of the U.S. House of Representatives (1917–1929, and 1930–1937)	
Eldon Beau Boulter	1965	BA	Former member of the United States House of Representatives from Amarillo (1985–1989)	
Jack Brooks	1943; 1949	BA; LL.B.	Former member of the U.S. House of Representatives (1953–1995)	
John Carter	1969	JD	Member of the U.S. House of Representatives (2003–)	
Jim Chapman	1968	BBA	Former member of the U.S. House of Representatives (1985–1997)	
Henry Cuellar	1981; 1998	JD; PhD	Member of the U.S. House of Representatives (2005– )	
Lloyd Doggett	1967; 1970	BA; JD	Former justice of the Texas Supreme Court (1989–1994), Member of the U.S. House of Representatives (1995– )	
Bob Eckhardt	1935; 1939	BA; LL.B.	Former member of the U.S. House of Representatives (1967–1981)	
Pete Geren	1974; 1978	BA; JD	Former member of the U.S. House of Representatives (1989–1997)	
Charles Gonzalez	1969	BA	Member of the U.S. House of Representatives (1999– )	
Ed Gossett	1924; 1927	BA; LL.B.	Former member of the U.S. House of Representatives (1939–1951)	
Rubén E. Hinojosa	1962	BBA	Member of the U.S. House of Representatives (1997– )	
Frank Ikard	1936; 1937	BA; LL.B.	Former member of the U.S. House of Representatives (1951–1961)	
John Marvin Jones	1907	LL.B.	Former member of the U.S. House of Representatives (1917–1940)	
Abraham Kazen, Jr.	1940	Pre-Law	Former member of the U.S. House of Representatives (1967–1985)	
Richard Kleberg	1911	JD	Former member of the U.S. House of Representatives (1931–1945)	
Marvin Leath	1954	BBA	Former member of the U.S. House of Representatives (1979–1991)	
Tom Loeffler	1968; 1971	BA; JD	Former member of the U.S. House of Representatives (1979–1987)	
Bill Patman	1953	BBA; LL.B.	Former member of the U.S. House of Representatives (1981–1985)	
J.J. Pickle	1938	BA	Former member of the U.S. House of Representatives (1963–1995), namesake of the University of Texas' J.J. Pickle Research Campus	
Morris Sheppard	1897	BA	Former member of the U.S. House of Representatives (1902–1913)	
Mac Sweeney	1897	BA	Former member of the U.S. House of Representatives from Wharton (1985–1989)	
William Homer Thornberry	1897	BA	Former member of the U.S. House of Representatives (1949–1963)	
Jim Turner	1897	BA	Former member of the U.S. House of Representatives (1997–2005)	

=== United States governors ===
Name	Class year(s)	Degree(s)	Notability	Reference
Greg Abbott	1981	BBA	48th governor of Texas	
Dolph Briscoe	1942	BA	41st governor of Texas	
Jeb Bush	1974	BA	43rd governor of Florida	
John B. Connally	1939; 1941	BA; LL.B.	39th governor of Texas, wounded while riding in the car during the assassination of President John F. Kennedy	
Dan Moody	1910; 1914	BA; LL.B.	30th governor of Texas and opponent of the Ku Klux Klan; at age 33 he was elected and took office as the youngest governor in Texas history	
Bill Owens		BA; LL.B.	40th governor of Colorado	
Ann Richards		BA; LL.B.	45th governor of Texas	

=== Politicians and diplomats outside the U.S. ===
Name	Class year(s)	Degree(s)	Notability	Reference
Allah Bachayo Talpur	1936	MSc	Member of the Sindh Legislative Assembly, member of the Imperial Council of Agricultural Research, member of American Soybean Association	
Francisco Santos Calderón			Former vice president of Colombia (2002–2010)	
Laurentino Cortizo	1979	MBA	President of Panama (2019–)	
María de Lourdes Dieck-Assad	1983	PhD	Economist, former Mexican ambassador to the European Union (2004–2007)	
Salam Fayyad	1986	PhD	Former prime minister of the Palestinian National Authority (2007–2013)	
Hişyar Özsoy	2004; 2010	MSc, PhD	Kurdish academic and politician in Turkey	
Abdullah Tariki	1947	MA	First and former Saudi minister of petroleum and mineral resources (1960–1962); co-founder of the OPEC	
Fernando Belaúnde Terry	1935	BA	Former president of Peru (1963–1968, 1980–1985)	
Dinesh Trivedi	1974	MBA	Former Indian union minister of state for health and family welfare (2009 and 2011–2011); former union minister for railways (2011–2012)	
Bobby Hajjaj	1998	BA	State Minister for Primary and Mass Education, Government of the People's Republic of Bangladesh	

=== Members of the United States Cabinet ===
Name	Class year(s)	Degree(s)	Notability	Reference
Robert B. Anderson	1932	LL.B.	Secretary of the treasury (1957–1961), deputy secretary of defense (1954–1955), and secretary of the Navy (1953–1954) under Dwight D. Eisenhower	
James Baker	1957	JD	Secretary of state under George H. W. Bush, secretary of the treasury under Ronald Reagan, and White House Chief of Staff under both George H.W. Bush and Ronald Reagan	
William J. Bennett		PhD	President Reagan's chairman of the National Endowment for the Humanities (1981–1985); secretary of education (1985–1988); President George Herbert Walker Bush's "drug czar" (1989–1990)	
Lloyd Bentsen	1942	LL.B.	U.S. representative (1948–1955); U.S. senator (1970–1992); secretary of the treasury under President Bill Clinton	
George Christian	1971	BA	Journalist, former White House press secretary (1966–1969)	
Ramsey Clark	1949	BA	Lawyer, former United States attorney general (1967–1969)	
Tom C. Clark	1922	BA; LL.B.	Former United States attorney general (1945–1949)	
John Connally	1941	LL.B.	39th governor of Texas (1963–1969); former United States secretary of the treasury (1971–1972); seriously wounded during the assassination of John F. Kennedy	
Donald Evans	1969; 1973	BSc; MBA (McCombs)	Former secretary of commerce under George W. Bush	
Scott McClellan	1991	BA	Former White House press secretary (2003–2006)	
Rex Tillerson	1975	BSc	69th United States secretary of state (2017–2018)	

=== Armed forces ===
Name	Class year(s)	Degree(s)	Notability	Reference
Bobby Ray Inman	1950	BA	Retired United States Navy admiral, director of the National Security Agency, Lyndon B. Johnson Centennial Chair in National Policy (University of Texas at Austin)	
Neel Ernest Kearby	1936	BBA	World War II aviator, Medal of Honor recipient	
Jeannie Leavitt	1990	BA	First female fighter pilot in the United States Air Force	
William McRaven	1977	BA	Retired United States Navy admiral, 2014 commencement speaker	
Russell Albert Steindam	1968	BA	Army ranger, Medal of Honor recipient	
Robin G. Tornow	1972	MA	Retired United States Air Force brigadier general	
Charles F. Widdecke	1941	BA	Retired United States Marine Corps major general; recipient of the Navy Cross	

=== Other U.S. political and legal figures ===
Name	Class year(s)	Degree(s)	Notability	Reference
Stacey Abrams	1998	MPA	Activist, Minority Leader (2011–2017) in the Georgia House of Representatives, candidate in the 2018 and 2022 Georgia gubernatorial elections	
Elsa Alcala		J.D.	Judge of the Texas Court of Criminal Appeals, Place 8; former Houston prosecutor and state district and intermediate appeals judge	
Ben Barnes			Former Texas speaker of the House (1965–1969) and lieutenant governor of Texas (1969–1973)	
Dan Bartlett		BA	White House communications director for President George W. Bush	
Steven Best			Professor of philosophy and spokesperson for the Animal Liberation Front	
William H. Bledsoe		Attended briefly c. 1889	Lawyer and member of both houses of the Texas legislature from Lubbock, 1915–1929	
Ed Blizzard	1975	BA	Prominent pharmaceutical injury attorney	
Bill Blythe		BA	Republican state representative from Harris County, 1971–1983	
Esther Buckley		BSc	Member of the United States Commission on Civil Rights, 1983–1992; educator in Laredo, Texas	
George C. Butte	1904	MA	Republican gubernatorial nominee in 1924; member of the Supreme Court of the Philippine Islands, 1932–1936	
Frank Kell Cahoon	1957	BSc	Midland oilman; former Republican member of the Texas House of Representatives	
John Carona	1978	BBA	Member of the Texas Senate from District 16, 1996–2015	
Liz Carpenter	1942	BJ	Former press secretary to First Lady Lady Bird Johnson	
Waggoner Carr			Law school, former speaker of Texas House of Representatives and attorney general of Texas	
Carlos Cascos		Accounting	Secretary of state of Texas, beginning 2015; outgoing county judge of Cameron County, Texas, 2007–2015	
Nellie Connally			Former first lady of Texas	
Kilmer B. Corbin		Law	Texas state senator from Lubbock (1949–1957); father of actor Barry Corbin	
Christi Craddick	1992	Bachelor's degree	Texas Railroad Commission member since 2012 from Midland; daughter of Texas state representative Tom Craddick	
Vivien Crea	1972	BA	Vice admiral; first woman to attain flag rank; first female vice commandant of the U.S. Coast Guard	
Brandon Creighton	c. 1992	Bachelor of Arts	Member of the Texas House of Representatives from Conroe; lawyer and businessman	
Phil Dyer	1973	BBA	Mayor of Plano, Texas (2009–2013), president of LegacyTexas Bank	
Elma Salinas Ender	1974	BSc	First Hispanic woman to serve on a state district court in Texas, judge of the 341st Judicial District 1983–2012	
Marsha Farney	2007	PhD in curriculum development and educational instruction	Texas state representative from District 20 in Williamson County; former member of the Texas State Board of Education from District 10	
Tommy Franks		(never graduated)	Former commander-in-chief of U.S. Central Command	
Kenn George		MBA	Texas state representative from Dallas (1999–2003); businessman	
Mike Godwin	1980; 1990	BA; JD	First staff lawyer for the Electronic Frontier Foundation, former general counsel of Wikimedia Foundation	
Craig Goldman		BA	Member of the Texas House of Representatives from his native Fort Worth; real estate businessman	
Veronica Gonzales		JD	Member of the Texas House of Representatives (2005–2012); lawyer	
John W. Goode	1943	Bachelor's degree	Attorney in San Antonio and Republican political figure in the 1950s and 1960s	
Lance Gooden		BA; BBA	Texas state representative for Kaufman County (2011–2015; 2017– ), businessman	
Lena Guerrero		(never graduated)	Former Texas state representative from Travis County, first woman to serve on the Texas Railroad Commission	
Gina Hinojosa	1996	BA	Member of Texas House of Representatives	
Bobby Inman	1950	BA	Former director of the National Security Agency	
Joe Jamail	1950; 1953	BA; JD	Trial lawyer	
Cyndi Taylor Krier	1971	Bachelor's degree	First Republican woman to serve as both a state senator from Bexar County (1985–1993) and as Bexar County administrative judge (1993–2001)	
Dan Kubiak	1962	BBA; PhD	Texas state representative from Rockdale (1969–1983; 1991–1998), businessman	
John Kuempel		Bachelor's degree	Texas state representative from Seguin (since 2010), businessman	
Fritz Lanham	1900	BA	Politician, author of Lanham Act, the law governing U.S. trademark policy	
Jodie Anne Laubenberg		BA	Texas state representative from Collin County since 2003, businesswoman in Allen, Texas	
Adam R. Lee	2002	BA	Maine state representative	
Debra Lehrmann	1979; 1982	BA; JD	Texas Supreme Court justice (Place 3), former 360th District Court judge in Fort Worth	
Joe K. Longley	1969	JD	138th president of the State Bar of Texas (2018)	
José Manuel Lozano	2003	BA	Texas state representative from Kingsville since 2011	
Crawford Martin		Law school courses; transferred to Cumberland School of Law	Attorney general of Texas (since 1967), former Texas state senator (1949–1963); Texas secretary of state (1963–1966); mayor of Hillsboro	
Charles Matthews	2006	PhD	Mayor of Garland, Texas 1984–1986, member of the Texas Railroad Commission 1995–2005, and chancellor-emeritus of the Texas State University System 2005–2010	
Robert Morrow	1990	Master of Business Administration	Chairman of the Travis County Republican Party since 2016; considered a conspiracy theorist and anti-Hillary Clinton activist	
Steve Munisteri		BBA; JD	Departing Republican Party of Texas state chairman	
Jim Murphy	1980	BA	Republican member of the Texas House of Representatives from Houston, 2007–2009 and since 2011; real estate businessman	
Elizabeth Neumann		BA Government	Counterterroism expert in the George W. Bush Administration; deputy chief of staff and assistant secretary of Threat Prevention and Security for the United States Department of Homeland Security in the first Trump administration	
David Newell		Law degree	Republican member of the Texas Court of Criminal Appeals; former Harris County assistant district attorney	
George E. Nowotny	1955	BSc	Republican member of the Arkansas House of Representatives from Fort Smith, 1967–1972; since resident of Tulsa, Oklahoma	
James E. Nugent	1949	JD	Member of the Texas House of Representatives from Kerrville (1961–1979) and member of the Texas Railroad Commission (1979–1995)	
Howard Peak	1967	BA in history	San Antonio mayor 1997–2001	
Dade Phelan	1998	Bachelor's degree	Republican state representative for District 21 in Beaumont, Speaker of the Texas House of Representatives (2021–)	
Four Price		BA	Republican state representative for District 87 in Amarillo	
Bennett Ratliff	1983	BS in civil engineering	Republican state representative from District 115 in Dallas County (2013–2015)	
Bill Ratliff		BS in civil engineering	Republican state senator from Mount Pleasant (1989–2000; 2003–2004) and lieutenant governor (2000–2003)	
Sam Rayburn			Former speaker of the U.S. House of Representatives	
Richard Raymond		BA	State legislator, advocate for Hispanic causes	
John Ben Shepperd	1941	LL.B	State attorney general (1953–1957)	
Steven Wayne Smith	1986	Law	Former justice of the Texas Supreme Court	
Sarah Weddington			Attorney and lecturer, represented "Jane Roe" in the landmark Roe v. Wade U.S. Supreme Court case	
Bill White	1974	BA	Mayor of Houston	
Harry Whittington		BA, JD	Texas attorney, known for being accidentally shot by Vice President Dick Cheney	
Pamela Willeford	1972	BA	U.S. ambassador to Switzerland and Liechtenstein	
Jared Woodfill		BA	Houston attorney; chairman of the Harris County Republican Party, 2002–2014	

== Journalism and media ==
Name	Class year(s)	Degree(s)	Notability	Reference
Paul Begala	1983; 1990	BA; JD	Former host of CNN's Crossfire	
Benjamin Bryant		(medically withdrew)	Radio and television broadcaster, BZ/MP executive editor, host of The Brink with Benjamin Bryant	
Liz Carpenter	1942		Feminist writer, former press secretary to First Lady Lady Bird Johnson	
Walter Cronkite			Anchor for CBS Evening News	
David Cruz		BA	Anchor for KNBC in Los Angeles and spokesperson for League of United Latin American Citizens	.
Alireza Jafarzadeh	1981	MSc	Media commentator on the Middle East, TV news analyst	
Harvey Kronberg	1972		Owner and operator of the Quorum Report and Texas Energy Report, political analyst for Spectrum News	
Bryan Mealer	1999	BA	Journalist and Author	
Betty Nguyen	1995	BA	Anchor for The CBS Morning News	
James C. Tanner		BA	Journalist, winner of the 1961 Gerald Loeb Award for Newspapers	
Stephanie Trong	1998	BA	Former executive editor of the magazine Jane (2005–2007)	
Ben Wedeman	1982	BA	Senior correspondent for CNN	
Joe Yonan	1989	BA	Food and Dining editor and "Weeknight Vegetarian" columnist for The Washington Post	

== Literature, writing, and translation ==
Name	Class year(s)	Degree(s)	Notability	Reference
Raye Virginia Allen		BA MA	Cultural historian and author	
Raymond Benson	1978	BFA	Thriller author, most known as the first American to pen official James Bond novels	
Gail Caldwell	1978; 1980	BA; MA	Book critic at The Boston Globe, winner of the 2001 Pulitzer Prize for Distinguished Criticism	
Michael Chorost	1988; 2000	MA; PhD	Author (Rebuilt: How Becoming Part Computer Made Me More Human), authority on cochlear implants and neurally controlled prosthetics	
J. M. Coetzee	1968	PhD	Winner of 2003 Nobel Prize in Literature	
Deborah Coonts	2011	MA	Romantic mystery novelist, lawyer	
Madison Cooper	1915	BA	Businessman, novelist (Sironia, Texas)	
Judy Dean	1976	Bachelor's degree in Radio/TV/Film	Author of Winston Pooh: An Investigation into the Real Story behind the Stories	
Kate Heyhoe		BA	Cookbook author	
Rolando Hinojosa	1953	BA	Novelist, winner of the Premio Quinto Sol prize	
H.L. Hix	1985; 1987	MA; PhD	Award-winning poet, program director at the University of Wyoming	
Elmer Kelton	1948	BA	Western novelist, winner of a number of prizes in western literature	
Julie Kenner	1987	BA	Romance and fantasy author	
Kelsey McKinney	2014	Bachelor's degree	Journalist, podcaster, and author	
Willie Morris	1956	BA	Author, journalist, editor of Harper's Magazine, Rhodes scholar	
Ladan Osman		MFA	Poet and teacher; winner of the 2014 Sillerman First Book Prize	
Sharon Kay Penman		BA	Author of historical novels (Welsh Princes Trilogy, Plantagenet Series)	
Lawrence Person	1987	BA	Science fiction writer, editor of Hugo Award-nominated SF-fanzine Nova Express	
Gab Reisman		MFA	Playwright	
Pamela Ribon	1996	BFA	Novelist, television writer, actor	
Rick Riordan	1986	BA	Novelist (the Percy Jackson & the Olympians series)	
Olen Steinhauer		BFA	Novelist (the Milo Weaver Trilogy)	
Bruce Sterling		BFA	Hugo- and Nebula Award-winning science fiction novelist, cyberpunk (Mirrorshades: The Cyberpunk Anthology, The Difference Engine)	
Whitley Strieber	1968	BA	Horror and science fiction novelist (The Wolfen, Warday), Ufologist (Communion)	
Janice Woods Windle			Author of historical novels (True Women)	

== Social reformers ==
Name	Class year(s)	Degree(s)	Notability	Reference
Rip Esselstyn	1986		Food writer and health activist	

== Sports ==
=== Baseball ===
Name	Class year(s)	Degree(s)	Notability	Reference
Max Alvis			Former MLB baseman	
Roger Clemens		(never graduated)	Starting pitcher for five MLB teams, 7-time Cy Young Award-winner, 1986 American League MVP, 11-time All-Star, 2-time World Series champion, winner of 1983 College World Series	
Dennis Cook			Former MLB pitcher	
Jordan Danks			MLB outfielder	
Kirk Dressendorfer			Former MLB pitcher, National College Baseball Hall of Famer	
Adam Dunn			MLB outfielder	
Bibb Falk			Former MLB left fielder; former University of Texas baseball coach	
Ron Gardenhire		(never graduated)	Former MLB shortstop, former manager of the Minnesota Twins	
Jerry Don Gleaton			Former MLB pitcher	
Wayne Graham			Former MLB pinch hitter, third baseman and left fielder	
Burt Hooton			Former MLB pitcher, National College Baseball Hall of Famer	
J. P. Howell			MLB pitcher	
Calvin Murray			Former MLB outfielder	
Spike Owen			Former MLB shortstop	
Mark Petkovsek			Former MLB pitcher	
Omar Quintanilla			MLB infielder	
Bruce Ruffin			Former MLB pitcher	
Calvin Schiraldi			Former MLB pitcher	
Kal Segrist		(never graduated)	MLB second baseman; fifth head coach of the Texas Tech Red Raiders baseball program	
Huston Street			MLB pitcher	
Greg Swindell			Former MLB pitcher, member of the 1984 Olympic Baseball Team	
Taylor Teagarden			MLB catcher	

=== Softball ===
Name	Class year(s)	Degree(s)	Notability	Reference
Cat Osterman			Former NPF player, Olympic gold and silver medalist	

=== Basketball ===
Name	Class year(s)	Degree(s)	Notability	Reference
LaMarcus Aldridge		(never graduated)	NBA power forward, 7-time NBA All Star	
D. J. Augustin			NBA point guard	
Mohamed Bamba			NBA center for the Orlando Magic	
Avery Bradley			NBA shooting guard	
J'Covan Brown			Player in the Israel Basketball Premier League	
Jamie Carey	2005	BA; MSc	Former WNBA point guard	
Marcus Carr			Basketball player in the Israeli Basketball Premier League	
Matt Coleman III			Player for Hapoel Haifa of the Israeli Basketball Premier League	
Kevin Durant		(never graduated)	NBA small forward and shooting guard, 2014 NBA MVP, 2008 NBA Rookie of the Year, 8-time NBA All-Star, 2010 FIBA World Championship MVP, 3-time NBA scoring champion, 2-time NBA champion, 2-time NBA Finals MVP	
Maurice Evans			NBA small forward and shooting guard	
T. J. Ford		B.S.	Former NBA point guard	
Daniel Gibson			NBA guard	
Jordan Hamilton			Player in the Israel Basketball Premier League	
Nekeshia Henderson			Former WNBA player	
Royal Ivey			NBA point guard	
Chris Mihm			Former NBA center	
Elijah Mitrou-Long			Canadian-Greek basketball player for Hapoel Holon of the Israeli Basketball Premier League	
Johnny Moore			Former NBA point guard	
Terrence Rencher		(never graduated)	Former NBA point guard	
Isaiah Taylor			Player in the Israel Basketball Premier League	
James Thomas			Former NBA forward, current player for Israeli Maccabi Haifa BC	
B. J. Tyler			Former NBA point guard	
Danny Wagner			Former NBL and NBA guard	

=== Football ===
Name	Class year(s)	Degree(s)	Notability	Reference
Major Applewhite	2002	BS	Former college quarterback, 2001 Holiday Bowl MVP, former co-offensive coordinator and quarterbacks coach for UT Austin, current University of South Alabama head coach	
Don Barton		(never graduated)	Former NFL halfback	
Cedric Benson			NFL running back, Doak Walker Award winner	
Jim Bertelsen			Former NFL running back	
Glenn Blackwood			Former NFL safety	
Justin Blalock			NFL guard	
Bill Bradley			Former NFL defensive back	
James Brown			Former quarterback	
Tarell Brown			NFL cornerback	
Bob Bryant			American Football League end	
Earl Campbell		(never graduated)	Former NFL running back, College Football and Pro Football Hall of Famer	
Kwame Cavil		BA	Former NFL, current CFL wide receiver	
Jamaal Charles			NFL running back, former track and field athlete	
Quan Cosby		(never graduated)	NFL wide receiver	
Tim Crowder			NFL defensive end	
Leonard Davis			NFL offensive guard	
Gib Dawson			Former NFL halfback	
Phil Dawson		BA	NFL placekicker	
Derrick Dockery		BA	NFL offensive guard	
Jermichael Finley			NFL tight end	
Jerry Gray			Former NFL cornerback, College Football Hall of Famer	
Cedric Griffin			NFL cornerback	
Michael Griffin		BA	NFL safety	
Casey Hampton			NFL nose tackle	
William Harris			Former NFL tight end	
Tony Hills			NFL offensive tackle	
Priest Holmes			Former NFL running back	
Michael Huff			NFL safety and cornerback	
Quentin Jammer			NFL safety	
Derrick Johnson		(never graduated)	NFL linebacker	
J. T. King			Head football coach and athletic director of the Texas Tech Red Raiders	
Tom Landry	1949	BBA	Former NFL cornerback and head coach, NFL Hall of Famer	
Bobby Layne		(never graduated)	Former NFL quarterback, College Football and NFL Hall of Famer, source of the "Curse of Bobby Layne"	
Jeff Leiding	1984		All-American and NFL player	
D. D. Lewis			NFL linebacker	
Colt McCoy			NFL quarterback	
Eric Metcalf			Former NFL running back and wide receiver, return specialist	
Roddrick Muckelroy	2008	BA	NFL linebacker	
Dan Neil			Former NFL offensive guard, two-time Super Bowl champion	
Tommy Nobis			Former NFL linebacker, College Football Hall of Famer	
Frank Okam			NFL defensive tackle	
Brian Orakpo			NFL linebacker	
Cory Redding		(never graduated)	NFL defensive end	
Bijan Robinson	2023		NFL running back	
Brian Robison		BA	NFL defensive end	
Shaun Rogers			NFL defensive tackle	
Aaron Ross			NFL cornerback	
Bo Scaife	2004	BA	NFL tight end	
Jonathan Scott			NFL offensive tackle	
Lyle Sendlein	2006	BA	NFL center	
Jordan Shipley			NFL wide receiver	
Chris Simms		BA	Former NFL quarterback	
Harry Stafford			NFL back	
Tom Stolhandske			NFL and CFL player	
James Street			Former college football quarterback	
Kasey Studdard		BA	NFL offensive guard	
Limas Sweed			Former NFL, current CFL wide receiver	
David Thomas		BSc	NFL tight end	
Earl Thomas			NFL safety	
Marcus Tubbs			NFL defensive tackle	
Justin Tucker			NFL placekicker	
Nathan Vasher			Former NFL cornerback	
Mike Williams			Former NFL offensive tackle and guard	
Ricky Williams		(never graduated)	Former NFL and CFL running back	
Roy Williams			Former NFL wide receiver	
Hugh Wolfe	1938		All-American and NFL player	
Rodrique Wright			NFL and CFL defensive end	
Selvin Young	2006	BA	NFL running back	
Vince Young	2013	BA	NFL quarterback	

=== Golf ===
Name	Class year(s)	Degree(s)	Notability	Reference
Mark Brooks			Winner of the 1996 PGA Championship	
Ben Crenshaw			Winner of 1984 and 1995 Masters Tournaments, World Golf Hall of Fame inductee, 1972 NCAA champion	
Bob Estes			Professional golfer	
Harrison Frazar	1996	Psychology	Professional golfer	
Tom Kite		(never graduated)	Professional golfer, World Golf Hall of Famer, golf course architect, first pro player to add a third wedge to his bag	
Justin Leonard		(never graduated)	Professional golfer, Open Championship winner (1997)	
Harvey Penick			Professional golfer and golf coach, World Golf Hall of Famer, author	
Scottie Scheffler	2018	Finance	Winner of 2022 Masters Tournament, 2024 Masters Tournament, and 2024 Paris Olympics gold medal	
Jordan Spieth			Winner of 2015 Masters Tournament, 2015 US Open, and the 2017 Open Championship	
Sherri Steinhauer		(never graduated)	Professional golfer, Women's British Open winner	
Jhonattan Vegas			Venezuelan professional golfer	

=== Swimming ===
Name	Class year(s)	Degree(s)	Notability	Reference
Ricky Berens	2010	Finance	Specialized in freestyle events; world record-holder in the 4 × 200 m freestyle relay, two-time Olympic gold medalist in the 4 × 200 m freestyle relay in the 2008 Beijing Olympics and 2012 London Olympics, Olympic silver medalist in the 4 × 100 m freestyle relay in London, two-time NCAA champion	
Jack Conger	2017		Specializes in butterfly and freestyle events; gold medalist in the 4 × 200 m freestyle relay at the 2016 Summer Olympics in Rio de Janeiro, 9-time NCAA Champion, 17-time All-American, 3-time NCAA team champion, current NCAA, American, and U.S. Open record-holder in the 200-yard butterfly	
Ian Crocker	2005	BSc	World record-setter and winner of 4×100 m medley relay gold medals in both the 2000 and 2004 Summer Olympics	
Josh Davis	1994		Won three gold medals in the 1996 Summer Olympics and two silver medals in the 2000 Summer Olympics	
Nate Dusing	2002		Won the bronze medal in the 400 m freestyle relay at the 2004 Summer Olympics and the silver medal in the 800 m freestyle relay at the 2000 Summer Olympics	
Anna Elendt			World Champion at 2025 World Aquatics Championships	
Jimmy Feigen	2012		Won a silver medal at the 2012 Summer Olympics and a gold medal for the 4x100-meter freestyle relay for the 2016 Summer Olympics	
Townley Haas	2019		Specializes in freestyle events; gold medalist in the 4 × 200 m freestyle relay at the 2016 Summer Olympics in Rio de Janeiro, Olympic finalist in the 200 m freestyle at the 2016 Summer Olympics (5th place), 10-time NCAA champion, 18-time All-American, 3-time NCAA team champion, former NCAA, American, and U.S. Open record-holder in the 200-yard freestyle, 2019 AAU Sullivan Award finalist	
Brendan Hansen	2005	BSc	Former world record holder in the 100 m and 200 m breaststroke and current record holder in the 4×100 m medley relay; at the 2004 Summer Olympics won the gold medal in the 4×100 m medley relay, silver at the 100 m breaststroke, and bronze at the 200 m breaststroke; at the 2008 Summer Olympics his team won gold and set a world record in the 4×100 m medley relay	
Shaun Jordan	1991		Won gold medal in the 4 × 100 m freestyle relay at both the 1988 and 1992 Summer Olympics	
Will Licon	2017	Sport Management	Specializes in breaststroke and medley events; 11-time NCAA Champion, 15-time All-American, 3-time NCAA team champion, current NCAA, American, and U.S. Open record-holder in the 200-yard breaststroke, 2017 Big 12 Athlete of the Year, Texas Cowboys alum	
Aaron Peirsol	2006		Won Olympic medals at the 2000 (silver in 200 m backstroke), 2004 (gold in the 100 m and 200 m backstroke and the 4×100 m medley relay), and 2008 Summer Olympics (gold in the 100 m backstroke and 4×100 m medley relay, silver in the 200 m backstroke); former world record-holder in the 100 m backstroke, current world record-holder 4×100 m medley relay, current world record-holder in the 200 m backstroke	
Joseph Schooling	2018		Specializes in butterfly, freestyle, and medley events; gold medalist in the 100 m butterfly in the 2016 Summer Olympics in Rio de Janeiro, winner of Singapore's first Olympic medal in swimming, Olympic record-holder in the 100 m butterfly, 12-time NCAA champion, 22-time All-American, 4-time NCAA team champion, former NCAA and U.S. Open record-holder in the 100 & 200 y butterfly	
John Shebat	2019		Specializes in backstroke, butterfly, and medley events; 5-time NCAA Champion, 9-time All-American, 3-time NCAA team champion, and the 2017 Big 12 Swimmer of the Year	
Clark Smith	2017		Specializes in freestyle events; gold medalist in the 4 × 200 m freestyle relay at the 2016 Summer Olympics in Rio de Janeiro, 4-time NCAA Champion, 6-time All-American, 3-time NCAA team champion, former NCAA, American, and U.S. Open record-holder in the 500 and 1650 y freestyles, current American record-holder in the 1000 y freestyle; son of University of Texas Olympic swimmer Tori Trees	
Kirk Stackle	1990		1988 Olympic team in the 200 breaststroke	
Garrett Weber-Gale	2007		Swimmer, two-time Olympic gold medalist, world record-holder in two events	
Joscelin Yeo	2003		Rhodes scholar, competed on the Singapore national team at the 1992, 1996, 2000, and 2004 Summer Olympics, more Olympic games than any other Singaporean athlete	

=== Track and field ===
Name	Class year(s)	Degree(s)	Notability	Reference
Sanya Richards-Ross	2006	BSc	Medalist in 2004, 2008, and 2012 Summer Olympics	

=== Soccer ===
Name	Class year(s)	Degree(s)	Notability	Reference
Haley Berg	2021	BA	Professional soccer player	
Cyera Hintzen	2020	BA	Professional soccer player	

=== Other sports ===
Name	Class year(s)	Degree(s)	Notability	Reference
Andrew Craig		Corporate Communications	Professional mixed martial artist formerly competing in the UFC's Middleweight Division	
Mary Lou Retton			First female gymnast outside Eastern Europe to win the Olympic all-around title, five-time Olympic medalist, 1984 Sports Illustrated Sportswoman of the Year	
Eileen Tell			Tennis player	

== Miscellaneous ==
Name	Class year(s)	Degree(s)	Notability	Reference
Mark Aguhar		Fine Art	Artist and activist	
Natalia Anciso	2008	BA	Contemporary artist and educator	
Stacy Barnett	2009	BSc	Victim in the West Campus murders in 2009	
Nancy Lee Bass	1937	English	Philanthropist	
William Lee Bergstrom		(never graduated)	Gambler and high roller	
Brian Brushwood	1997	Plan II honors program	Magician, podcaster, author, lecturer, known for Scam School	
Thomas Darnell	1979		Contemporary painter	
Monique Evans		Nutritional Science and Pre-Med major	Miss Texas 2014 and Miss Florida USA 2020	
John Goosey	2008	BA	Victim in the West Campus murders in 2009	
Ann Hand		(never graduated)	Jewelry designer	
Louis Sager Hunsucker Jr.	1959		Poker player	
Karin MacPhail		BA	Episcopal bishop	
Virginia Mecklenburg	1968, 1970	B.A., M.A.	Curator at the Smithsonian American Art Museum	
Lisa Orr	1983	B.A.	Potter and teacher of ceramics	
Gladys Roldan-de-Moras			Oil painter	
Brucene Smith			Miss Texas World 1971, Miss World USA 1971, Miss American Beauty 1974 (Miss U.S. International 1974) & Miss International 1974	
Jessica Trisko	2006	Master of Arts	Miss Earth 2007	

== See also ==
- List of University of Texas at Austin faculty
- University of Texas at Austin

== Notes ==
- Blank cells indicate missing information; em-dashes (—) indicate that the alumnus attended but never graduated from UT Austin.
