= Andrea Volkamer =

German bioinformatician

- Born: 1982 (age 43–44)
- Occupation: Professor of Data-Driven Drug Development
- Title: Professor

Academic background
- Education: University of Hamburg

Academic work
- Discipline: Bioinformatician
- Institutions: Saarland University
- Website: https://volkamerlab.org/

Andrea Volkamer (born 1982) is a German bioinformatician and professor of “Data-Driven Drug Design” at Saarland University and an associated researcher at the Helmholtz Institute for Pharmaceutical Research Saarland (HIPS). Her research focuses on data-driven drug design, with an emphasis on method development and application.

== Career ==
Andrea Volkamer studied bioinformatics at Saarland University from 2001 to 2007 and graduated with a Master of Science. From 2007 to 2008, she was a visiting scientist at Purdue University in Indiana (USA). She then completed her doctorate at the University of Hamburg at the Center for Bioinformatics (ZBH), where she was awarded the title of Dr. rer nat. in the computer science department in 2013. In 2013, Andrea Volkamer was awarded a Pro Exzellenzia PostDoc Fellowship, a program of the University of Hamburg that qualifies women for leadership positions. In the same year, she accepted a position as a postdoc at the BioMedX Institute in Heidelberg, where she stayed until 2016 and – together with Merck KGaA – worked on methods for developing selective kinase inhibitors.

This was followed by an appointment as junior professor at the Charité in Berlin, where Andrea Volkamer led a working group on structural bioinformatics and in silico toxicology from 2016 to 2022. As part of the BMBF-funded Berlin-Brandenburg Research Platform (BB3R), the working group was concerned, among other things, with the development of new computer methods for the risk assessment of chemicals to reduce the use of animal experiments in basic research. Furthermore, she is working on structure-based methods to identify new kinase inhibitors. In this context, she was also able to win professors John Chodera as an Einstein Visiting Fellow.

In 2022, Andrea Volkamer returned to Saarland University and has since held the professorship for Data-Driven Drug Design at the Faculty of Mathematics and Computer Science. She is also an associate scientist at the Helmholtz Institute for Pharmaceutical Research Saarland (HIPS).

Andrea Volkamer supports open science and open source developments. Among other things, she is driving the development of TeachOpenCADD, an open teaching platform for computer-aided drug design (CADD), and has been involved in the free “Dr. med. AI” learning offer of AI Campus.

== Academic distinctions and honorary posts ==
- Board member, Computer in Chemistry (CIC) of the German Chemical Society (2021–2024)
- Corwin Hansch Award (QSAR, Chemoinformatics and Modeling Society (QCMS)) (2022)
- Journals:
  - Journal of Chemical Information and Modeling (Editorial Advisory Board)
  - Living Journal of Computational Molecular Science (Editorial Board)
  - Artificial Intelligence in the Life Sciences (Editorial Board)
