= George Holden =

George Holden may refer to:

- George Holden (Australian rules footballer) (1889–1959), Australian rules footballer for Fitzroy
- George Holden (footballer, born 1859) (1859–1920s), English association footballer
- George Holden (New South Wales politician) (1808–1874), Australian politician, member of Legislative Council of New South Wales
- George Holden (Victorian politician) (1868–1934), Australian politician, member of the Legislative Assembly of Victoria
- George S. Holden (1868–1935), American football player
- George Holden (RAF officer) (1913–1943), RAF officer
- George Holden (professor), professor and developmental psychologist
- Sir George Holden, 2nd Baronet (1890–1937) of the Holden baronets
- Sir George Holden, 3rd Baronet (1914–1976) of the Holden baronets

== See also ==
- George Holden Tinkham, United States politician
