= Castleman =

Castleman is a surname. Notable people with this name include:

- A. Welford Castleman Jr., American scientist
- Alice Barbee Castleman (1843–1926), American social leader, philanthropist, and suffragist
- Benjamin Castleman (1906–1982), American pathologist best known for Castleman's disease
- Boomer Castleman, American singer-songwriter and guitarist from Farmers Branch, Texas
- Charles Castleman (disambiguation), several people
- Foster Castleman (born 1931), former professional baseball player
- Frank Castleman (1877–1946), American football and baseball player, track athlete, and coach in multiple sports
- John Breckinridge Castleman (1841–1918), brigadier general and prominent landowner and businessman in Louisville, Kentucky
- Ken Castleman, president of Advanced Digital Imaging Research and author of the canonical textbook Digital Image Processing
- Margaret Weissinger Castleman (c. 1880–1945), American suffragist and campaigner
- Myron Castleman, main character in 12:01 PM
- Robert Lee Castleman, American country singer and songwriter
- Slick Castleman (1913–1998), pitcher in Major League Baseball

== See also ==
- Castleman Run Lake Wildlife Management Area, near Bethany, West Virginia, USA
- Castleman Trailway, footpath in Southern England
- Castleman's disease, uncommon lymphoproliferative disorder that can involve single lymph node stations or can be systemic
- John B. Castleman Monument, within the Cherokee Triangle of Louisville, Kentucky, USA
- United States v. Castleman, a 2014 US Supreme Court decision about whether persons convicted of domestic violence misdemeanors may be barred from gun ownership
