= Thomas Darnell =

Thomas Darnell may refer to:

- Thomas August Darnell (born 1950), American musician
- Sir Thomas Darnell, 1st Baronet (died 1638), English landowner at the centre of a celebrated legal case
- Thomas Darnell (painter) (born 1958), American painter
