= Almadena Chtchelkanova =

Russian scientist

- Education: Moscow State University (Ph.D.); University of Texas at Austin (M.A.)
- Scientific career
- Fields: Computing, physics
- Workplaces: United States Naval Research Laboratory; National Science Foundation
- Academic advisors: James C. Browne

Almadena Yurevna Chtchelkanova is a Russian-American scientist. She is a program director in the Division of Computing and Communication Foundations at the National Science Foundation.

== Education ==
Chtchelkanova completed a Ph.D. in physics from Moscow State University in 1988. In 1996, she earned a M.A. in the department of computer sciences at University of Texas at Austin. Her master's thesis was titled The application of object-oriented analysis to sockets system calls library testing. James C. Browne was her advisor.

== Career ==
She worked as a senior scientist for Strategic Analysis, Inc. which provided support to DARPA. She provided support and oversight of the Spintronics, Quantum Information Science and Technology (QuIST) and Molecular Observation and Imaging programs. She worked at the United States Naval Research Laboratory for 4 years in the laboratory for computational physics and fluid dynamics. Chtchelkanova joined the National Science Foundation in 2005. She is a program director in the Division of Computing and Communication Foundations and oversees programs involving high performance computing.

Chtchelkanova has conducted research in the field of spintronics, a branch of condensed matter physics and electronics that studies the use of electron spin in addition to charge for information processing and device functionality. The field emerged as an important direction for future electronic technologies, including magnetic memory and spin-based logic devices. Chtchelkanova co-authored research examining the development of spintronics and its technological prospects, discussing advances in spin-dependent transport and magnetic materials relevant to electronic applications.
