= Virginia Mecklenburg =

American art historian

Virginia M. Mecklenburg
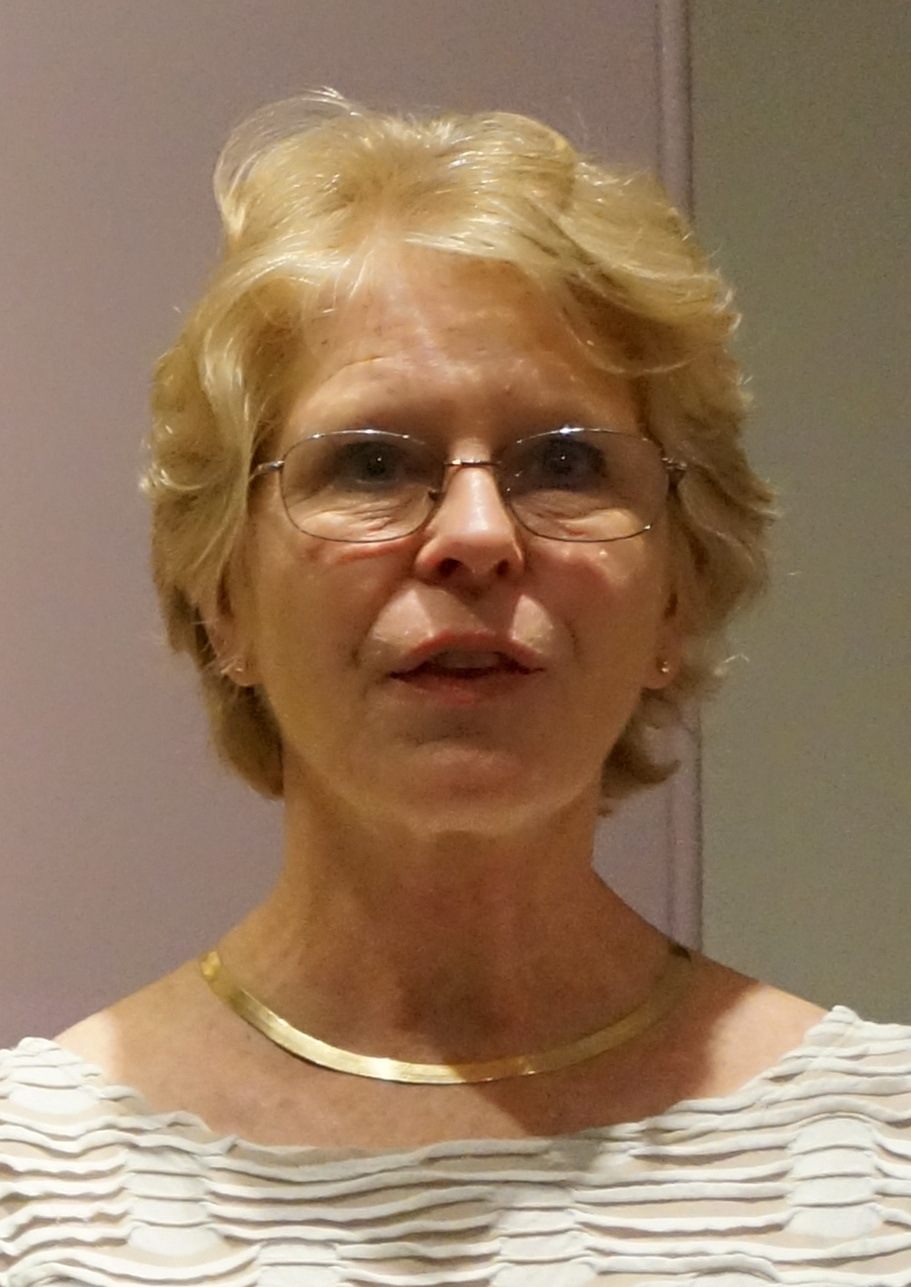
- Mecklenburg in 2015.
- Born: Virginia Helen McCord; November 11, 1946 (age 79); United States
- Occupations: Art historian Curator
- Spouse: Marion Mecklenburg

Academic background
- Education: University of Texas at Austin; University of Maryland
- Thesis: American Aesthetic Theory, 1908-1917: Issues in Conservative and Avant-Garde Thought (1983)
- Doctoral advisor: Elizabeth Johns

Academic work
- Discipline: Art history
- Sub-discipline: American art

Virginia Helen McCord Mecklenburg (born November 11, 1946) is an American art historian and curator. She was a curator at the Smithsonian American Art Museum for 45 years, from 1979 to 2024.

== Early life and education ==
Mecklenburg received two English degrees from the University of Texas at Austin: a Bachelor of Arts in 1968 and a Master of Arts in 1970. Her master's thesis was titled "An Analysis of Role Playing as a Method of Teaching English to the Disadvantaged Learner." Mecklenburg then continued on to the University of Maryland to earn a Ph.D. in art history in 1983. Her doctoral dissertation "American Aesthetic Theory, 1908-1917: Issues in Conservative and Avant-Garde Thought" was supervised by Professor Elizabeth Johns.

== Curatorial career ==
Mecklenburg became a curator of painting and sculpture at the National Museum of American Art, later the Smithsonian American Art Museum (SAAM), in 1979. A scholar of American art, Mecklenburg has written publications on such artists as George Bellows, Richard Estes, William Glackens, Edward Hopper, Robert Indiana, Georgia O'Keeffe, John Sloan, and Robert Vickrey. Exhibitions organized or co-organized by Mecklenburg include "The Patricia and Phillip Frost Collection: American Abstraction 1930-1945" (1989); "Edward Hopper: The Watercolors" (1999); "Earl Cunningham's America" (2008), "Telling Stories: Norman Rockwell From the Collections of George Lucas and Steven Spielberg" (2010), "African American Art: Harlem Renaissance, Civil Rights Era and Beyond" (2012); "Richard Estes' Realism" (2014); and "Subversive, Skilled, Sublime: Fiber Art by Women" (2024).

At SAAM, Mecklenburg rose from associate curator to chief curator. Stephanie Stebich, who became SAAM director in 2017, effectively demoted Mecklenburg to "senior curator" in 2019; Stebich was subsequently removed from the director position by Smithsonian Institution management in mid-2024, after years of declining staff morale and complaints about workplace environment.

Mecklenburg retired from SAAM in April 2024.

== See also ==
- List of University of Maryland, College Park people
- List of University of Texas at Austin alumni
