= Christina Cogdell =

American art historian

- Born: Christina Grace Cogdell; 1969 (age 56–57); Austin, Texas, United States
- Occupations: Professor; Art historian
- Spouse: Todd Gogulski
- Parent(s): John Cogdell; Ann Conkling

Academic background
- Education: University of Texas at Austin; University of Notre Dame
- Thesis: Reconsidering the Streamline Style: Evolutionary Thought, Eugenics, and United States Industrial Design, 1925–1940 (2001)
- Doctoral advisor: Linda Dalrymple Henderson; Jeffrey L. Meikle

Christina Grace Cogdell (born 1969 in Austin) is an American art historian and educator. Cogdell is currently Professor of Design and Chair of the Department of Design at the University of California, Davis. Her research focuses on the intersection between architecture and biology, as well as eugenics.

== Early life and education ==
Born to John Cogdell and Ann Conkling, Cogdell received two summa cum laude degrees in American Studies: a Bachelor of Arts from the University of Texas at Austin (1991) and a Master of Arts from the University of Notre Dame (1994). She then returned to Austin to earn a Doctor of Philosophy in Art History (2001), and wrote a doctoral dissertation titled "Reconsidering the Streamline Style: Evolutionary Thought, Eugenics, and United States Industrial Design, 1925–1940," under the supervision of Linda Dalrymple Henderson and Jeffrey L. Meikle.

== Career ==
Upon graduating, Cogdell began teaching as Assistant Professor of Liberal Studies at California State University, Fullerton. She remained there until 2004, upon being hired as Assistant Professor of Art History at Santa Fe University of Art and Design. Cogdell then held a one-year Postdoctoral Fellowship at the University of Pennsylvania in 2008. After that, she moved to the University of California, Davis, where she currently holds the dual role of Professor of Design and Chair of the Department of Design.

== Works ==
- Toward a Living Architecture?: Complexism and Biology in Generative Design, University of Minnesota Press, 2019 ISBN 978-1452958064
- Eugenic Design: Streamlining America in the 1930s, University of Pennsylvania Press, 2004 ISBN 978-0812238242
- Popular Eugenics: National Efficiency and American Mass Culture in the 1930s, co-edited with Sue Currell, Ohio University Press, 2006 ISBN 978-0821416921

== See also ==
- List of California State University, Fullerton people
- List of people from Austin, Texas
- List of University of Notre Dame alumni
- List of University of Texas at Austin alumni
