= Jeffrey L. Meikle =

American historian (born 1949)

- Born: Jeffrey Lee Meikle; July 2, 1949 (age 77); Columbus, Ohio, U.S.
- Occupations: Professor; Historian
- Spouse: Alice Marie Stone
- Children: Jason Stone Meikle; Vanessa Kathryn Meikle
- Parent(s): Wendell Alvin Meikle; Arlene Martha Craner

Academic background
- Education: Brown University; University of Texas at Austin
- Thesis: Technological Visions of American Industrial Designers, 1925-1939 (1977)
- Doctoral advisor: William H. Goetzmann

Academic work
- Institutions: Colby-Sawyer College; University of Texas at Austin
- Doctoral students: Christina Cogdell

Jeffrey Lee Meikle (born July 2, 1949, in Columbus) is an American cultural historian and educator. Meikle is currently the Stiles Professor in American Studies Emeritus at the University of Texas at Austin. He has generally been credited as one of the founders of the discipline of design history since his book Twentieth Century Limited: Industrial Design in America, 1925-1939 was published in 1979. The text lays out some of the central issues confronting the field.

== Career ==
Born to Wendell Alvin Meikle and Arlene Martha Craner in Columbus, Meikle initially attended the Thomas Jefferson School in St. Louis. He received both his Bachelor of Arts and Master of Arts in American Civilization from Brown University in 1971, graduating summa cum laude. Meikle wrote a thesis was titled "The Metaphysics of Technology: Entropy and Information as Metaphors of Society in Twentieth-Century America." He then continued on to the University of Texas at Austin, where he received a Doctor of Philosophy in American Studies in 1977. Meikle completed a dissertation titled "Technological Visions of American Industrial Designers, 1925-1939," under the supervision of William H. Goetzmann.

While a student in Austin, Meikle was an instructor at the school until graduating. He then moved to Colby–Sawyer College for one year to teach courses in American Studies. In 1979, Meikle returned to Texas and was hired as assistant professor of American Studies. He was promoted to associate professor in 1986, and then to full Professor in 1995. In 2011, the professorship was endowed as the Stiles Professor in American Studies. Eleven years later, Meikle retired from the post as Emeritus. Throughout his career, his research has focused on American studies and design history.

== Works ==
- Twentieth Century Limited: Industrial Design in America, 1925-1939. Philadelphia: Temple University Press, 1979
- American Plastic: A Cultural History. New Brunswick: Rutgers University Press, 1995
- Design in the USA. Oxford, England: Oxford University Press, 2005
- Postcard America: Curt Teich and the Imaging of a Nation, 1931-1950. Austin: University of Texas Press, 2015

== See also ==
- List of Brown University people
- List of people from Columbus, Ohio
- List of University of Texas at Austin alumni
- List of University of Texas at Austin faculty
