= Ed Blizzard =

American lawyer (born 1954)

Edward F. Blizzard (born January 14, 1954, in Chester, Pennsylvania) is a pharmaceutical injury attorney and a founding partner of Blizzard Greenberg, PLLC based in Houston, Texas.

== Education ==
Blizzard attended the University of Texas at Austin and graduated with honors in 1975. He earned his law degree from Baylor University School of Law in 1978, where he graduated cum laude and earned induction into the Order of the Barristers.

== Legal career ==
Blizzard began his career with Fulbright & Jaworski, a national litigation firm. In 1981, he founded the firm now named Blizzard, McCarthy & Nabers, a Houston-based firm specializing in pharmaceutical and medical litigation.

One of Blizzard's first high-profile victories for victims came in 1989 when he represented Lisa (Neat) Kilgore, a victim of the Austin Choker Rapist, in her landmark case against the Board of Pardons and Paroles. The state of Texas had negligently paroled serial rapist Thomas Earl Grettenberg prior to his attack on Kilgore. It was the first and only time the state admitted to error and agreed to pay compensation to a crime victim for negligent parole of a criminal. The case was featured on 60 Minutes and A Current Affair with Maury Povich.

Blizzard has been at the center of some of the largest pharmaceutical injury verdicts and settlements in the country by taking on some of the world's largest corporations, including Bristol-Myers, Merck, Pfizer and Dow Chemical. In the mid-1990s, as counsel to the Tort Claimant’s Committee, Blizzard represented nearly 200,000 women worldwide who were injured or made ill by the silicone breast implants made by Dow Corning. As a chief negotiator in the landmark settlement, Blizzard won a $3.2 billion settlement for women exposed to Dow Corning silicone.

Blizzard also negotiated major settlements over diet drugs and Ephedra supplements including products Fen-Phen and Metabolife. In 2007, as part of a six-member committee, he helped to negotiate a $4.85 billion settlement between Merck and nearly 27,000 patients who suffered medical problems while taking Vioxx.

For the past several years, Blizzard has been a member of committees taking on Sulzer Hip Implants, Bayer's Baycol and Bausch & Lomb's ReNu With MoistureLoc. His most recent cases center on AstraZeneca's psychotropic drug, Seroquel. Over 15,000 patients have sought legal recourse after the company engaged in off label promotion and failed to disclose the drug's medical risks including diabetes, weight gain and high blood sugar.

As of 2010, Blizzard was representing dozens of patients in litigation against denture cream manufacturers. The patients developed severe nerve damage and disability from using over the counter denture adhesive containing zinc.
