= Tiff's Treats =

American food manufacturing and delivery company

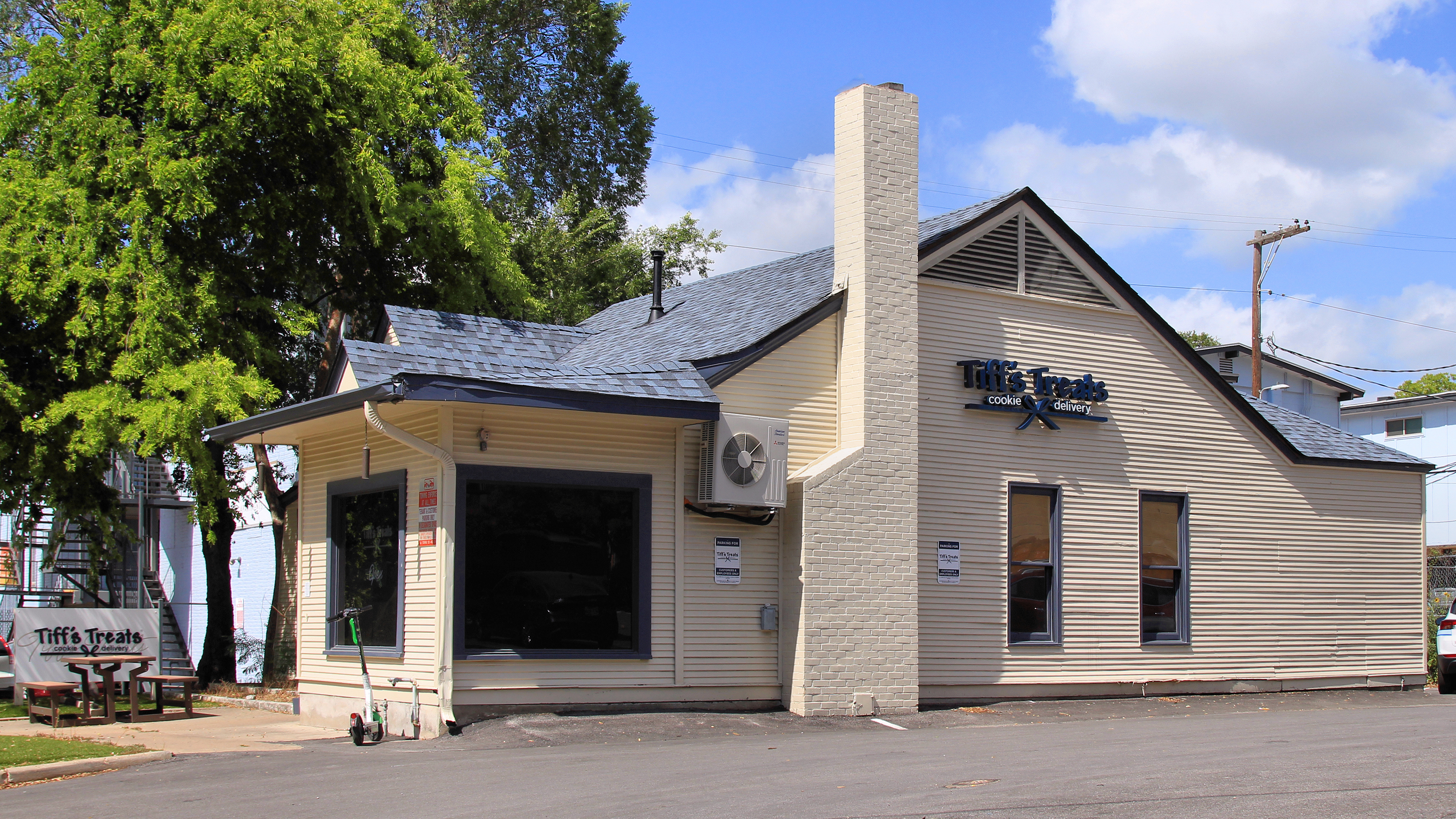
- Tiff's Treats central Austin, Texas, location
- Type: Private
- Industry: Food (bakery)
- Founded: 1999
- Founder: Leon Chen; Tiffany Chen
- Headquarters: Austin, Texas
- Number of locations: 93
- Total equity: $500 million
- Number of employees: 2,000
- Website: www.cookiedelivery.com

Tiff's Treats is a privately held cookie manufacturing and delivery company, founded in Austin, Texas, by two University of Texas graduates. The company operates 93 locations in eight states.

== History ==
Founders Tiffany Taylor and Leon Chen met as sophomores at the University of Texas at Austin. The idea for the company started after Tiffany accidentally stood Leon up for a date. She then delivered an apology in the form of warm cookies she'd just baked.

The company was established in 1999 with an initial manufacturing facility on Sixth Street in Austin. The founders would bake cookies and deliver them warm to dormitories around Austin. The company's first order was delivered to a woman named Amy.

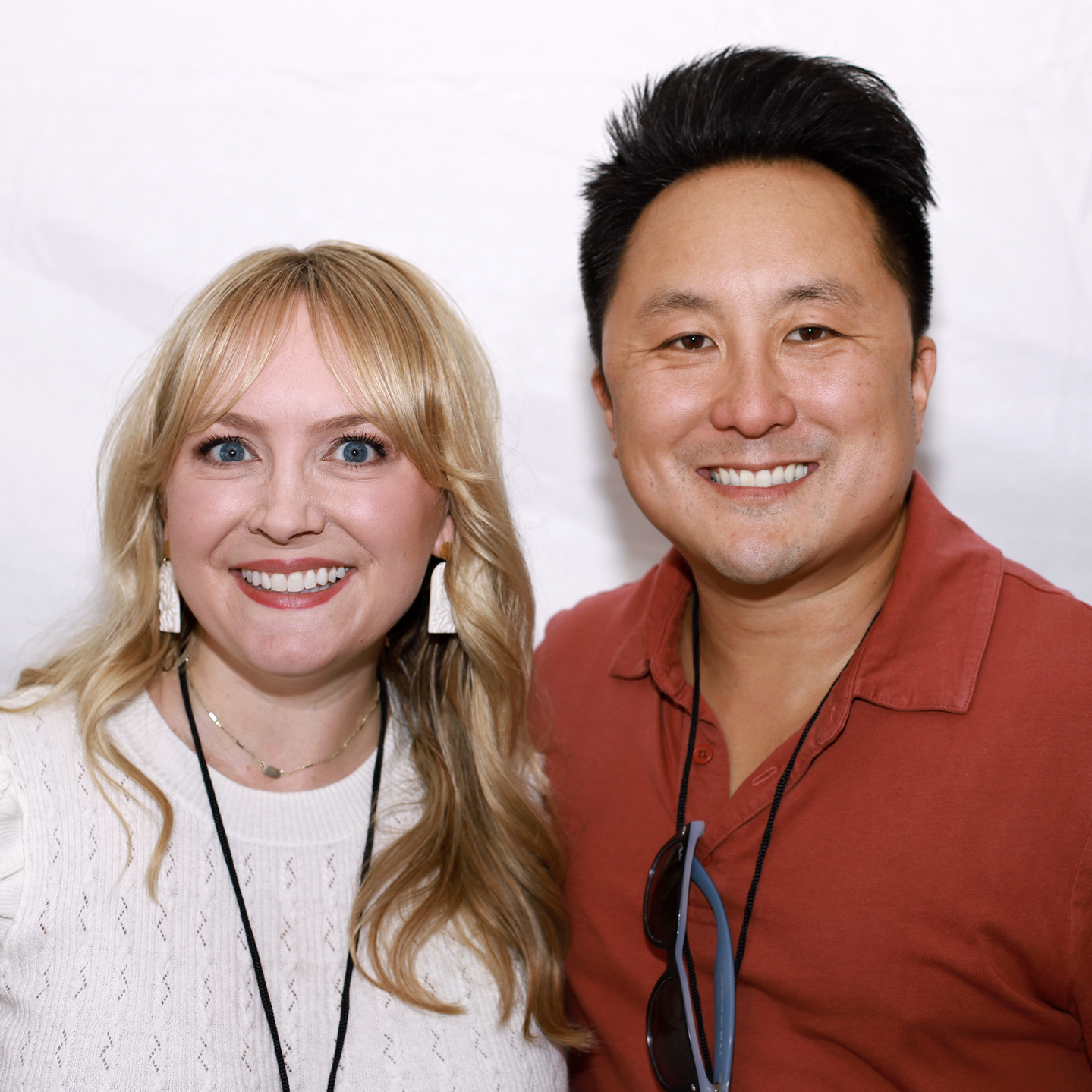
Founders Tiffany and Leon Chen in 2022

Tiff's Treats has conducted multiple rounds of financing and received more than $50 million in outside investment since its founding. In 2017, Morgan Stanley Expansion Capital reported that the fund had invested $25 million in the company and taken a seat on the board. In 2018 the company received additional financing from Andy Roddick and Brooklyn Decker. That same year, Tiff's Treats acquired Nashville-based Jake's Bakes, a company founded by a fellow University of Texas alumnus.

As of 2020, the company was valued at $500 million, with major investors including Kendra Scott, Dirk Nowitzki, Brooklyn Decker and Andy Roddick. As of 2022, Tiff's Treats employed 2,000 people with operations in five U.S. states, and has 70 retail locations. The Dallas location was the most trafficked.

Tiffany and Leon Chen were married in 2007 and are parents to twins.

Their book, It's Not Just Cookies: Stories and Recipes from the Tiff's Treats Kitchen, was published by Harper Horizon in April 2022.
