= Niu Jingyi =

Chinese biochemist

Niu Jingyi (钮经义, 1920–1995) was a Chinese biochemist. He was born on December 26, 1920, in Xinghua, Jiangsu. In 1942, he graduated from the chemistry department of the National Southwestern Associated University. He served as an instructor of Tsinghua University from 1946 to 1948. In 1948, he went to United States to study biochemistry at the University of Texas, five years later commenced doctor degree. In 1956, he came back to China.

His main research field is natural organic chemistry, containing the structure analysis and chemical synthesis of the protein polypeptides. In 1953 he finished his doctoral dissertation titled the microelement nutrition of the escherichia coli at US.

In 1958, the Chinese institute of biochemistry started the research of artificial synthesis of the crystallized bovine insulin with Niu as one of the main principals. He designed the synthesis route, and the synthesis finally achieved success in 1965. This achievement won the First National Natural Science Award in 1982. In 1983, he won the State Invention Second Prize for his new achievement in synthesis of the C-peptide.
