= Theresa A. Jones =

American neuroscientist

- Born: November 1, 1964 (age 61); Pine Bluff, Arkansas, United States
- Education: University of Missouri University of Texas at Austin
- Scientific career
- Fields: Psychology, Biopsychology, Behavioral Neuroscience
- Workplaces: University of Texas at Austin: University of Illinois at Urbana-Champaign; University of Washington; Georgetown University Medical Center
- Doctoral advisors: Timothy Schallert William Greenough
- Website: homepage.psy.utexas.edu/homepage/faculty/Jones/JonesBio/jones.html

Theresa A. Jones is a researcher and professor at the University of Texas at Austin and the Institute for Neuroscience. Her interests are in neural plasticity across the lifespan, motor skill learning, mechanisms of brain and behavioral adaptation to brain damage, and glial-neuronal interactions. Her research is on the brain changes following stroke, in particular rehabilitation strategies and the brain changes associated with them. She primarily tests rats and uses the Endothelin-1 stroke model. Her most recent work has expanded into the field of microstimulation mapping of the rat cortex.

== Early life and education ==
Theresa Jones was born in Pine Bluff, Arkansas on November 1, 1964. Throughout her childhood, her family moved around to Little Rock, Arkansas, Berkeley Heights, New Jersey, and St. Louis Missouri. She went to school as an undergraduate student at the University of Missouri. She began studying towards a major in general humanities, but she quickly found interest in the biological aspect of psychology. After leaving the University of Missouri in 1986, she went on to finish her Bachelor's degree in Psychology at the University of Texas at Austin in 1987. Theresa Jones enrolled in a graduate Biopsychology program at the University of Texas at Austin under the mentorship of Timothy Schallert. She received her doctoral degree in 1992 for her research on neural plasticity mechanisms of recovery after brain injury. Wanting to continue her studies in brain plasticity, she became a postdoctoral fellow in Behavioral Neuroscience and Biopsychology at the Beckman Institute of University of Illinois at Urbana-Champaign under the supervision of William Greenough until 1996.

== Career and research ==
Theresa Jones became an assistant professor in the Psychology Department and Neurobiology and Behavior Program at the University of Washington in 1996. In 2001, she moved to an assistant professor position at her alma mater, in the Psychology Department and Institute for Neuroscience at the University of Texas at Austin. After two years as an assistant professor, Theresa Jones was promoted to an associate professor position for five years, then a full professor in 2008. The following year, she received the UT faculty position of Behavioral Neuroscience Area Head. She spent a year as a Bergeron visiting professor in the Center for Brain Plasticity and Behavior at Georgetown University Medical Center in Washington, D.C. from 2013 to 2014. Theresa Jones then returned to the University of Texas at Austin to continue her research and teaching.

The courses that she teaches include Biopsychology, Neural Plasticity and Behavior, Quantifying Brain Structure, and Honors Research. Her laboratory studies the plasticity of neural structure and synaptic connectivity in adult animals following brain damage during skill learning. The lab has focused on three main questions: how the brain changes in response to altered behavioral experience, how the brain changes in adaptation to injury, and how behavioral experiences influence brain adaptation to injury.

Theresa Jones has published upwards of 80 peer-reviewed papers on these subjects, several of which have been cited over 100 times. The first was published in 1990 and the most recent in 2015. Additionally, she authored 10 book chapters and reviews between 1992 and 2013.

The most cited of her peer-reviewed journal publications include:

- Jones TA, Schallert T "Use-Dependent Growth Of Pyramidal Neurons After Neocortical Damage" Journal of Neuroscience 14 (4): 2140-2152 Apr 1994 Times Cited: 255
- Jones TA, Schallert T "Overgrowth And Pruning Of Dendrites In Adult-Rats Recovering From Neocortical Damage" Brain Research 581 (1): 156-160 May 22, 1992 Times Cited: 148
- Jones TA, Chu Cj, Grande La, Et Al. "Motor Skills Training Enhances Lesion-Induced Structural Plasticity In The Motor Cortex Of Adult Rats" Journal of Neuroscience 19 (22): 10153-10163 Nov 15 1999 Times Cited: 111
- Jones TA, Kleim Ja, Greenough WT "Synaptogenesis And Dendritic Growth In The Cortex Opposite Unilateral Sensorimotor Cortex Damage In Adult Rats: A Quantitative Electron Microscopic Examination" Brain Research 733 (1): 142-148 Sep 9 1996 Times Cited: 96
- Barth Tm, Jones Ta, Schallert T "Functional Subdivisions Of The Rat Somatic Sensorimotor Cortex" Behavioural Brain Research 39 (1): 73-95 Jun 18 1990 Times Cited: 95

Theresa Jones has submitted over 100 conference proceedings abstracts, several of which have been peer reviewed. Additionally, she was invited to about 65 external lectures and symposia to present her research and work.

== Awards and honors ==
Theresa Jones has been awarded research funding for numerous research initiatives from the National Institute of Neurological Disorders and Stroke, the Department of Defense, and the National Institutes of Health. Some of these include "Cortical Stimulation to Enhance Experience-Dependent Plasticity After Stroke", "Cognitive Neurorehabilitation to Enhance Recovery After Stroke", "Neural Plasticity and Neurorehabilitation Following Traumatic Brain Injury", and "Cortical Stimulation to Enhance Recovery After Stroke". The most recent research topics for which she has been awarded funding include "Neural Mechanisms of Compensating for Brain Damage", "Neurovascular Mechanisms of Time-Dependencies in Stroke Rehabilitation", "Microscale Oxygenation Mapping During Stroke", "Optical Imaging of Baseline Blood Flow and Oxygen During Stroke", and "Cortical Stimulation to Enhance Motor Recovery Following Traumatic Brain Injury".

As a postdoctoral fellow, Theresa Jones was honored with the Donal B. Lindsley Award in Behavioral Neuroscience in 1993. She was among the Top 10 Great Dissertations awarded by the American Psychological Science in 2004. In 2006, she was named both a Raymond Dickson Centennial Teaching Fellow and an American Psychological Association Fellow. Theresa received the President's Associates Teaching Excellence Award in 2012 for her work at the University of Texas at Austin. In 2013, she was named an Association for Psychological Science Fellow. Most recently, Theresa Jones was honored with the Harry Ransom Award for Teaching Excellence in 2014.

Theresa Jones is a member of numerous regional and national level committees such as the NIH Clinical Neuroscience and Disease and Acute Neural Injury and Epilepsy study sections, LoneStar Preclinical Stroke Consortium, and APA Committee on Animal Research and Ethics. She also has numerous positions on departmental and university committees such as the Psychology Department Executive Committee, Behavioral Neuroscience Search Committee, and Institutional Animal Care and Use Committee.
