= James C. Browne =

American computer scientist (1935–2018)

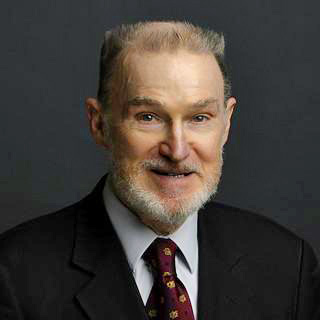
- Born: June 16, 1935; Conway, Arkansas
- Died: January 19, 2018 (aged 82); Austin, TX
- Education: Hendrix College (1956); University of Texas at Austin (1960)
- Known for: Parallel computing; Performance measurement; Operating systems; High-level languages
- Spouse: Patricia Gayle Moseley Browne
- Children: 3
- Awards: Fellow of the Association for Computing Machinery; Fellow of the British Computer Society; Fellow of the American Physical Society; Fellow of the American Association for the Advancement of Science; Fellow of the Institute for Constructive Capitalism
- Scientific career
- Fields: Physics; Computer science
- Institutions: Queen's University Belfast; University of Texas at Austin
- Thesis: The Electronic Energy of Helium Hydride (1960)
- Doctoral advisor: Albert Matsen

James Clayton "Jim" Browne (January 16, 1935 – January 19, 2018) was an American computer scientist.

== Early life and education ==
Born in Conway, Arkansas, he attended Hendrix College, where he studied chemistry. In 1960, he earned a doctorate in physical chemistry from the University of Texas and joined the faculty. Between 1963 and 1967, Browne worked at Queen's University Belfast in Northern Ireland, where he helped establish the school's first computational center. He was named a full professor upon his return to the University of Texas in 1968. For a time, Browne was chair of the department of computer science, and held the regents' chair #2 in computer sciences.

== Career ==
Browne founded the James C. Browne Graduate Fellowship Fund at the University of Texas, and was named a fellow of the Association for Computing Machinery, the American Physical Society, the American Association for the Advancement of Science, and the British Computer Society.

Browne was named one of the first faculty of the UT Computer Science Department in 1968, and served as Chair of Computer Science for a number of years, while retaining his appointment as Professor of Physics; he was a faculty member at UT for over 45 years. He had a prolific academic career, publishing nearly 500 research papers and supervising 69 Ph.D. students and 65 masters degree students as well as numerous undergraduate honors students. Browne was a ground-breaker throughout his career, becoming an internationally recognized expert in parallel programming and computation and performance optimization.

Browne was married to Gayle, with whom he had three children (Clayton, Duncan and Valerie), from 1959 to his death on January 19, 2018, aged 83.
