= Raye Virginia Allen =

American cultural historian

Raye Virginia Allen (1929 – March 26, 2022) was an American cultural historian and author.

== Personal life ==
Allen graduated from the University of Texas at Austin where she completed a Bachelor of Arts and a Master of Arts degree. She helped found the Cultural Activities Center in Temple, Texas during the 1950s, later becoming a founding trustee of the American Folklife Center at the Library of Congress and the Fund for Folk Culture.

Allen died in Temple on March 26, 2022.

== Recognition ==
Allen's book Gordon Conway: Fashioning a New Woman won the Liz Carpenter Women's History Award and the Violet Crown Non-Fiction Award. A $2,000 scholarship was founded in her name, titled the Raye Virginia Allen State President Scholarship.
