= Thomas Grettenberg =

American serial rapist

Thomas Earl Grettenberg (1951–52 – 1989) was an American serial rapist from Texas who attacked and sexually assaulted at least 10 and possibly as many as 24 women in 1977. He was known as the "Austin Choker".

Grettenberg's victims were predominantly young Jewish women studying at the University of Texas at Austin. His modus operandi included: nocturnal attacks; entry of the domicile while victim was asleep, strangulation with an electrical cord to the point of unconsciousness, followed by rape and sodomy. Identified via police sketches, Grettenberg, an aircraft refueler, was arrested at his apartment in the fall of 1977. In December, he was found guilty of three counts of aggravated sexual assault and two of burglary of a habitation. He was sentenced to 123 years in the Texas Department of Corrections but served only nine.

Less than six months into his 1986 parole in Houston, Grettenberg attacked two teenage girls in separate incidents. Convicted of burglary and theft, a Harris county court this time sentenced Grettenberg to a term of life with no eligibility for parole for 20 years.

In 1989, one of his Houston victims, a former teen beauty pageant contestant named Lisa Kilgore, filed a negligence suit against the Texas State Pardons and Parole Board for his 1986 early release. In September of the following year, in what is believed to be an unprecedented action, the Board admitted to error (but declined explanation) and settled out of court with Kilgore in the amount of $125,000.

Grettenberg died of cancer in prison a few weeks later.

== Sources ==
- Melissa Tarkington, "State Says It Will Pay Rape Victim", Austin American Statesman, 09-17-1990, p. A1
- Unknown, "Austin Serial Rapists," Austin American Statesman, 08-04-1991, p.B8
- Ron Lubke, "Police See Pattern in Nine Rapes", Austin American Statesman 07-12-1995, p. B1
