= Kenneth M. Merz Jr. =

American biochemist and molecular biologist

- Born: 1959 (age 65–66); Niagara Falls, New York United States
- Education: Washington College (1977–1981) The University of Texas at Austin (1981–1985) Cornell University (1986–1987) University of California, San Francisco (1987–1989)
- Scientific career
- Fields: Biochemistry, Molecular Biology, Quantum Chemistry
- Institutions: Pennsylvania State University (1989–2005); University of Florida (2005–2013); Michigan State University (2013–present)
- Doctoral advisor: M. J. S. Dewar

Kenneth M. Merz Jr. is an American biochemist and molecular biologist currently the Joseph Zichis Chair and a distinguished university professor at Michigan State University and editor-in-chief of American Chemical Society's Journal of Chemical Information and Modeling. A highly cited expert in his field, his research interests are in computational chemistry and biology and computer-aided drug design (CADD). His group has been involved in developing the widely using AMBER suite of programs for simulating chemical and biological systems and the QUICK program for quantum chemical calculations.

== Education and early life ==
Merz was born in Niagara Falls, New York, on January 24, 1959. His family moved to Gladwyne, Pennsylvania, where he graduated from Harriton High School in 1977. Merz studied chemistry at the undergraduate level at Washington College and where he graduated in 1981. In 1985, he received his Ph.D. from the University of Texas at Austin under the supervision of M. J. S. Dewar. After postdoctoral appointments with Roald Hoffmann from 1986 to 1987 and Peter Kollman from 1987 to 1989, he started his academic career at the Pennsylvania State University.

== Career ==
Merz joined the chemistry department at the Pennsylvania State University as an assistant professor in 1989. He was promoted to an associate professor in 1996 and professor in 1998. While at the Pennsylvania State University he took a sabbatical to work in the biopharmaceutical industry (1998-2001) as the senior director of the Center for Informatics and Drug Discovery (CIDD) at Pharmacopeia, Inc. and as the senior director of the ADMET Research and Development Group in the Accelrys software division of Pharmacopeia. He also founded, in 2001, the software company QuantumBio, Inc located in State College, Pennsylvania. In 2005, he joined the faculty at the University of Florida in the chemistry department and as part of the Quantum Theory Project. While he was at University of Florida, he was named the Colonel Allan R. and Margaret G. Crow Term Professor, 2009-2011, the University of Florida Research Foundation (UFRF) Professor, 2011-2013 and the Edmund H. Prominski Professor of Chemistry, 2011-2013. In 2013, Merz moved to Michigan State University as a professor in the Chemistry and Biochemistry and Molecular Biology Departments. He was the director of the Institute of Cyber-enabled Research (2013-2019) and is the Joseph Zichis Chair in Chemistry and a university distinguished professor. While his primary appointment is at Michigan State University, he has also held visiting Professorships at Imperial College, the Institute for Research in Biomedicine, École Polytechnique, University of Florence, University of Strasbourg, University of Oviedo and ETH Zurich.

== Research ==
Merz is known for his contributions to the use of linear-scaling quantum mechanical methods in biological and pharmaceutical sciences; QM/MM methods; force field design for proteins and metalloenzymes; atomic point charges; free energy studies and NMR and X-ray refinement using QM methods; the AMBER suite of programs for biomolecular simulation; and the ab initio QM program QUICK.

== Publications ==
- The Protein Folding Problem and Tertiary Structure Prediction K. M. Merz, Jr.; S. M. LeGrand Eds.; Birkhaüser: Boston, MA, 1994.
- Structure, Function and Dynamics of Lipid Bilayers K. M. Merz, Jr.; B. Roux Eds.; Birkhaüser: Boston, MA, 1996.
- Structure-Based Drug Design D. Ringe; C. R. Reynolds; K. M. Merz, Jr., Eds.; Cambridge University Press: Boston, MA, 2010

== Awards ==
- Election as an ACS Fellow (2010).
- ACS Award for Computers in Chemical and Pharmaceutical Research (2010).
- Alumni Citation, Washington College (2011).
- Election as a fellow of the American Association for the Advancement of Science (1999).
- John Simon Guggenheim Fellowship (1996-1997).

== Selected publications ==
- Using Quantum Mechanical Approaches to Study Biological Systems; K. M. Merz, Jr. Acc. Chem. Res. 2014 47, 2804–2811.
- Open-source multi-GPU-accelerated QM/MM simulations with AMBER and QUICK; V. Cruzeiro; M. Manathunga; K. M. Merz, Jr.; A. W. Götz J. Chem Inf. Model 2021, 61, 2109–2115.
- A Second Generation Force Field for the Simulation of Proteins, Nucleic Acids and Organic Molecules; W. D. Cornell; P. Cieplak; C. I. Bayly; I. R. Gould; K. M. Merz, Jr. D. M. Ferguson; D. C. Spellmeyer; T. Fox; J. W. Cladwell; P. A. Kollman J. Am. Chem. Soc. 1995, 117, 5179-5197.
- Metal Ion Modeling Using Classical Mechanics; P. Li; K. M. Merz, Jr. Chemical Reviews, 2017, 117, 1564–1686.
- Atomic Charges Derived from Semiempirical Methods; B. H. Besler, K. M. Merz, Jr., and P. A. Kollman J. Comput. Chem.1990, 11, 431-439.
- Free Energy Perturbation Simulations of the Inhibition of Thermolysin: Prediction of the Free Energy of Binding of a New Inhibitor; K. M. Merz Jr. and P. A. Kollman J. Am. Chem. Soc. 1989, 111, 5649-5658.
- The Amber Biomolecular Simulation Program; D. A. Case; T. E. Cheatham, III; T. Darden; H. Gohlke; R. Luo; K. M. Merz, Jr.; A. Onufriev; C. Simmerling; B. Wang; R. J. Woods J. Comput. Chem. 2005, 26, 1668-1688.
- Harnessing the Power of Multi-GPU Acceleration into the Quantum Interaction Computational Kernel Program; M. Manathunga; C. Jin; V. Cruzeiro; Y. Miao; D. Mu; K. Arumugam; K. Keipert; H. M. Aktulga; K. M. Merz, Jr.; A. Goetz J. Chem. Theory Comput. 2021.
