= Steve Madere =

Steve Madere was the founder and CEO of Deja News (now Google Groups) and holds a Master's in Science degree in physics from the University of California, San Diego. He has held numerous other positions at other firms including IBM, The Kernel Group (now Symantec), Barfly Interactive Networks, an interactive signage company in Austin, Texas and founded the Advisory board to Journyx.

== Honors ==
On December 2, 1998, the Austin chapter of the Association of Information Technology Professionals (AITP) named Madere "Austin Information Technologist of the Year".

== Deja News ==
Madere founded the Deja News Research Service in March 1995 in Austin, Texas, as an archive of messages posted to Usenet discussion groups. While archives of Usenet discussions had existed for as long as the medium itself, Deja News offered a novel combination of features: it was freely available to the public, provided a simple World Wide Web interface, allowed searches across all archived newsgroups, returned immediate results, and retained messages indefinitely. Its search capabilities won the service acclaim, generated controversy, and significantly changed the perceived nature of online discussion, transforming Usenet from a loosely organized, ephemeral communication tool into a valued information repository.

Although Madere was initially reluctant to remove archived material, protests from users and legal pressure led to the introduction of "nuking", a method allowing posters to permanently remove their own messages from search results. According to Humphrey Marr of Deja News, copyright-related removal requests most frequently came from the Church of Scientology.

The service later expanded beyond search, introducing "My Deja News", which allowed users to read Usenet in traditional chronological, per-group manner and post new messages, and "Deja Communities", private internet forums offered primarily to businesses. In 1999, the site, renamed Deja.com, shifted its primary focus to a shopping comparison service. By late 2000, facing financial distress, the company sold its shopping-comparison service to eBay, which incorporated the technology into Half.com. In February 2001, Google acquired the remaining Deja News archive and assets, forming the basis of Google Groups.
