= Jennifer Walden =

American physician

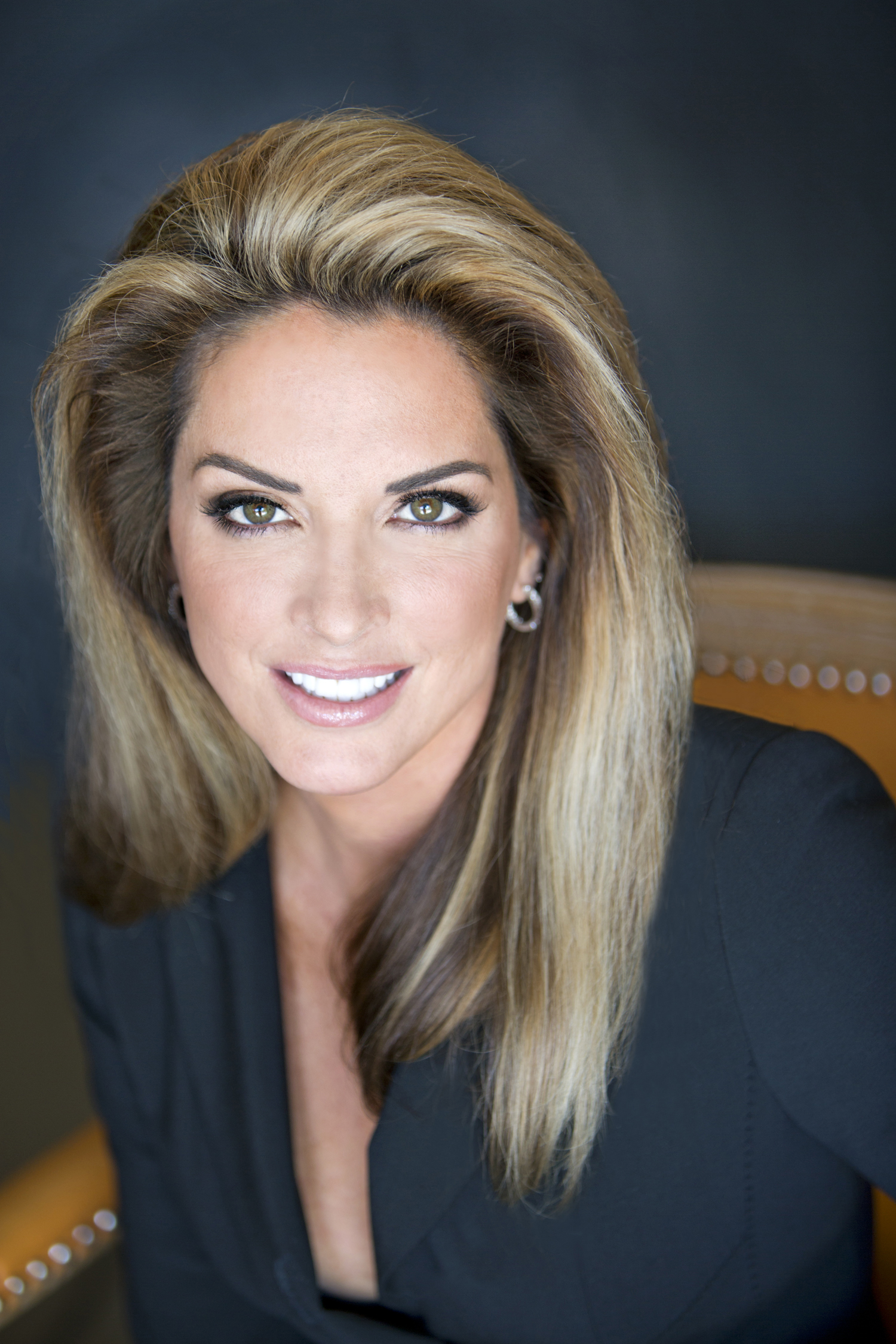
- Born: November 17, 1971 (age 54); Austin, Texas
- Occupation: Plastic surgeon
- Known for: Plastic surgery, authorship, media commentator

Jennifer Lee Walden is an American plastic surgeon, author, and entrepreneur. She is one of the first doctors to use laser machines to do a "a high volume of labiaplasties and vaginoplasties." Harper’s Bazaar listed Walden as one of the Best Beauty Surgeons in 2014. Walden is a member of Modern Aesthetics’ and Plastic Surgery Practice’s editorial board of Directors, and one of the few women to be elected to serve on the American Society for Aesthetic Plastic Surgery Board of Directors. She became the first female president of The Aesthetic Society in 2022.

She is the founder of Jennifer L. Walden, M.D., PLLC and Walden Cosmetic Surgery Center, PLLC, a private plastic surgery practice and ambulatory surgery center based in Austin, Texas with a satellite office in Marble Falls, Texas. In 2018, she opened Skintology by Dr. Jennifer Walden / The MedSpa Manhattan. This marked a return to New York City, where she started her career at the Manhattan Eye, Ear and Throat Hospital, and was mentored by Dr. Sherrell Aston. Walden has co-authored the textbook Aesthetic Plastic Surgery.

== Early life ==
Walden was born in Austin, Texas, the daughter of a dentist father and surgical nurse mother. She graduated from Anderson High School and obtained her undergraduate degree in biology at the University of Texas. She then received her MD from the University of Texas Medical Branch. Although originally waitlisted at the university, she graduated as salutatorian of her class.

== Career ==
Following her residency at the University of Texas Medical Branch, Walden obtained a fellowship in aesthetic surgery at the Manhattan Eye, Ear and Throat Hospital. She stayed on at the hospital following the end of her fellowship, and worked on New York City’s Upper East Side for seven and a half years. During her tenure in New York, she participated in clinical trials that led to the reintroduction of silicone breast implants.

Walden returned to her native Austin, Texas, in December 2011 following the birth of her twin sons, and opened up a private practice in Westlake Hills. She opened a satellite office in Marble Falls, Texas in 2014. She was also recognized as one of "The Best Plastic Surgeons in America" by American Way.

Walden is known for using Vectra, a 3-D imaging technology that visualizes a patient's look before surgery, and ThermiVa, a temperature-controlled, radio-frequency system for vaginal tightening and rejuvenation. Walden has also developed instruments for breast surgery, which are carried by the Accurate Scientific and Surgical Instruments (ASSI).

Walden serves as consultant for aesthetic companies including ThermiAesthetics, Venus Concept, Ideal Implant and Sciton Inc. She has been an expert commentator on plastic surgery by ABC News, Fox News, VH1, E!, and Dr 90210. She was included on the Newsweek list of "America's Best Plastic Surgeons" for 2021.

In 2021, Walden was announced as the first female physician to become president-elect of The Aesthetic Society. She became its first female president in 2022.

== Bibliography ==
- Walden, Jennifer L.; Aston, Sherrell J, and Steinbrech, Douglas S., Editor and Co-Author, Aesthetic Plastic Surgery Textbook;, Elsevier Limited, London, England; May 2009.
- Walden, Jennifer L., Freund, Robert M., and Aston, Sherrell J. Blefaroplastia. Ritidoplastia. Claudio Cardoso De Castro, Editor. Medsi Editora Medica e Cientifica Ltda, Rio de Janeiro, Brazil. Di Livros Editora Ltda, 2007.
- Walden, Jennifer L., Aston, Sherrell J. Rhytidectomy. Plastic Surgery Secrets, 2nd Edition. Jeffrey Weinzweig, MD, Editor. Elsevier Publishing, Philadelphia, PA, 2009.

== Journal articles ==
- Walden, Jennifer L, Panagapoulous, G., Shrader SW. Contemporary decision making and perception in patients undergoing cosmetic breast augmentation. 'Aesthetic Surgery Journal,. 2010 May-Jun; 30(3):395–403.
- Walden, Jennifer L., Amazia with Midface Anomaly; Discussion. Aesthetic Plastic Surgery, June 2007; 31: 395–396.
- Walden, Jennifer L., Orseck, Michael J., and Aston, Sherrell J. Current Methods for Brow Fixation: Are They Safe?; Journal of Aesthetic Plastic Surgery, Sept./Oct. 2006; Vol. 30(5).
- Walden, Jennifer L., Brown, C. Coleman, Klapper, Andrew J, Chia, Christopher T., and Aston, Sherrell J. An Anatomic Comparison of Transpalpebral, Endoscopic, and Coronal Approaches to Demonstrate Exposure and Extent of Brow Depressor Muscle Resection. Plastic and Reconstructive Surgery, 2005. 116(5): 1479–1487.
- Walden, Jennifer L., Schmid, Robert P., and Blackwell, Steven J., Cross-Chest Lipoplasty and Surgical Excision for Gynecomastia: A Ten Year Experience with our Technique; Aesthetic Surgery Journal, May/June 2004: 216–223.
- Walden, J, MD, Garcia, H, Crouchet, JR, Traber, LD, and Gore, DC, MD. Both Dermal Matrix and Epidermis Contribute to an Inhibition of Wound Contraction. Annals of Plastic Surgery 2000: 45: 162–166. Presented at the 31st Annual American Burn Association Meeting, Orlando, FL, March 1999

== Personal life ==
Walden has twin sons named Houston and Rex.
