= Journal of Chemical Information and Modeling =

- Discipline: Computational Chemistry and Cheminformatics
- Language: English
- Edited by: Kenneth M. Merz Jr.

Publication details
- Former names: Journal of Chemical Documentation, Journal of Chemical Information and Computer Sciences
- History: 1961-present
- Publisher: American Chemical Society (United States)
- Frequency: Monthly
- Impact factor: 6.4 (2025)

Standard abbreviations
- ISO 4: J. Chem. Inf. Model.

Indexing
- CODEN: JCISD8
- ISSN: 1549-9596 (print); 1520-5142 (web)
- LCCN: 2004212268
- OCLC no.: 54952610

Links
- Journal homepage; Online access; Online archive

The Journal of Chemical Information and Modeling is a peer-reviewed scientific journal published by the American Chemical Society. It was established in 1961 as the Journal of Chemical Documentation, renamed in 1975 to Journal of Chemical Information and Computer Sciences, and obtained its current name in 2005. The journal covers the fields of computational chemistry and chemical informatics. The editor-in-chief is Kenneth M. Merz Jr. (Michigan State University). The journal supports Open Science approaches.

== Abstracting and indexing ==
The journal is abstracted and indexed in:

- Chemical Abstracts Service
- Scopus
- ProQuest databases
- Science Citation Index
- Current Contents/Physical, Chemical & Earth Sciences
- Index Medicus/MEDLINE/PubMed.
