= George Holden (professor) =

American psychologist and scholar

George Walker Holden
- Education: University of North Carolina at Chapel Hill
- Occupations: Professor emeritus and Developmental Psychologist

George Walker Holden is professor emeritus and a developmental psychologist who worked at the Southern Methodist University, where he was the former chair of the Psychology Department. Prior to that he was professor at the University of Texas at Austin. Holden is the co-founder of the U.S. Alliance to End the Hitting of Children and the author of several books on the subject of child development.

== Early life ==
George Holden's father was Reuben A. Holden, who was an administrator at Yale University and later become President of Warren Wilson College in Asheville, North Carolina. He received his BA from Yale University and his MA and PhD in psychology from the University of North Carolina at Chapel Hill.

== Positions ==
After graduate school, in 1984 George Holden went to the University of Texas at Austin. Among other roles, he served as Associate Chair in the Department of Psychology. In 2008 he moved to Southern Methodist University where he was Professor of Psychology. From 2015 to 2020 he chaired the Department of Psychology. Holden co-founded the U.S. Alliance to End the Hitting of Children in 2011, and serves as the organization's president. From 2011 to 2020 he served on the board of Family Compass, a Dallas child abuse prevention non-profit, where he was board president from 2016 to 2017. He currently is on the board of the National Initiative to End Corporal Punishment (beginning in 2016) and joined the board of Nurturings (formerly Attachment Parenting International) in 2021. He was previously the president of the Society for Research in Human Development.

== Research ==
Holden has researched the problem of corporal punishment of children, parenting practices and cognitions, and family violence, in addition to other topics. In 2014 Holden released a study that showed evidence that parents that favor corporal punishment are prone to changing their minds on its usefulness if shown how the punishment can negatively affect their child. In addition to his research, Holden has discussed parenting and child abuse issues and controversies in the media, and has written for periodicals including the New York Times. In addition to research articles, he has published books on the subject including Parents and the Dynamics of Child Rearing, and he was the co-editor of the books Children Exposed to Marital Violence, and The Handbook of Family Measurement Techniques. He is also the author of Parenting: A Dynamic Perspective.

== Honors ==
Holden is a fellow of the Association for Psychological Science, and was a various academic organizations including the American Professional Society on the Abuse of Children, the International Society for the Child Abuse and Neglect, and the Society for Research in Child Development. In 2018 he received the Distinguished Career Award from the International Society for the Prevention of Child Abuse and Neglect. He also received the Outstanding Mentor Award from the Society for Research in Human Development in 2010.
