= Thomas Darnell (painter) =

American artist (born 1958)

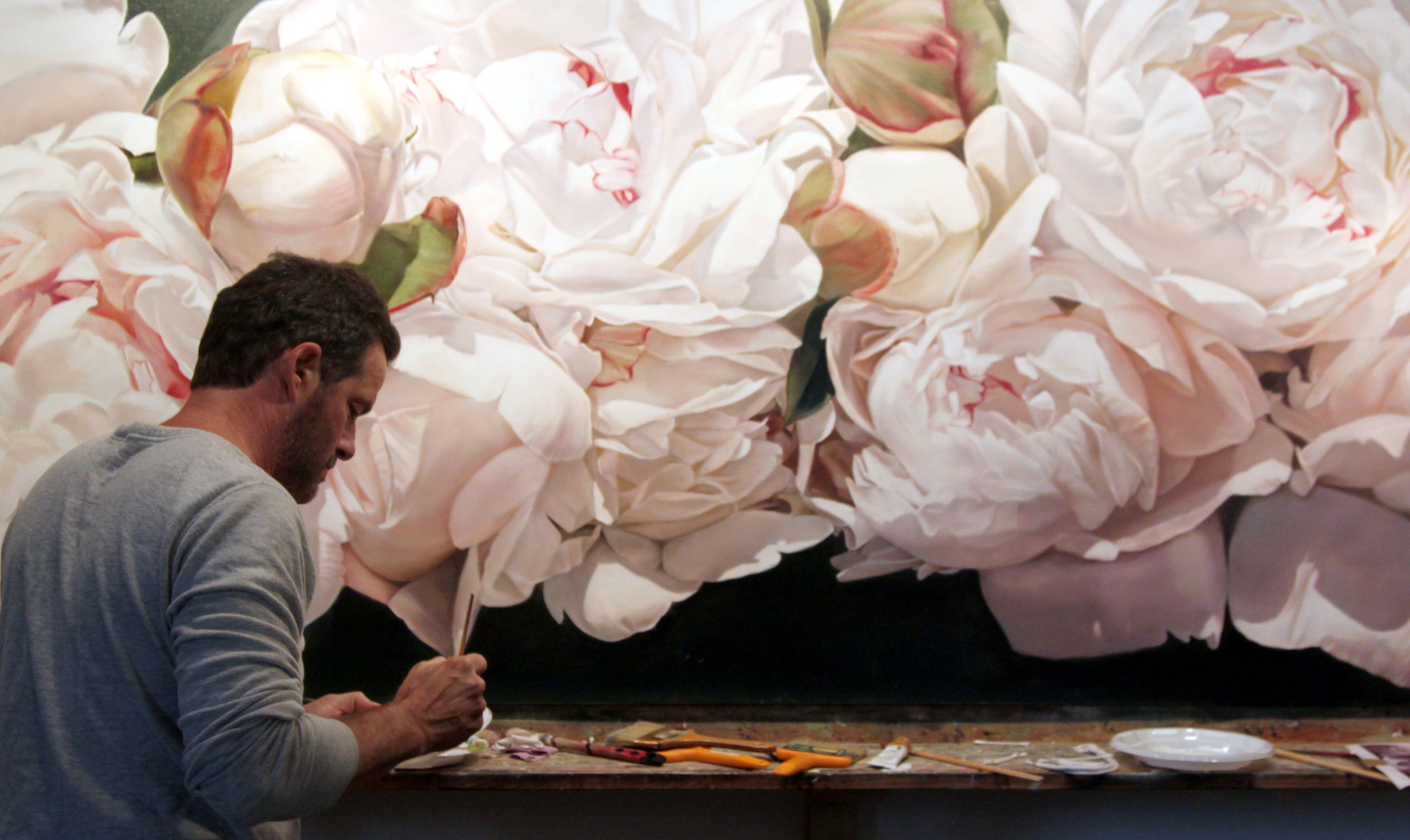
- Painter Thomas Darnell in his studio
- Born: February 2, 1958 (age 68); San Antonio, Texas, USA
- Education: University of Texas at Austin
- Known for: painting
- Website: http://thomasdarnell.com

Thomas Darnell (February 2, 1958) is an American artist known for his oil paintings of figurative landscapes and flowers, and abstracts.

French newspaper L'Indépendant describes his work as being influenced by modern painters Gerhard Richter and Ross Bleckner, but also by Caravaggio and Rembrandt.

== Life and work ==
Darnell and his second wife live in France, Darnell himself having initially moved to Paris in 1991 and subsequently to the South of France; however, he exhibits internationally. His work has been featured in multiple international publications, including Taiwanese design magazine ppapaer, Australian journal The Cool Hunter, Moco Loco, American design and lifestyle magazine Atlanta Homes Brigitte (Germany's largest women's magazine), Artful Living Magazine, Spanish design magazine El Mueble and monthly British fashion magazine Tatler.

Darnell was initially drawn to paint seriously after the death of his first wife. Throughout the 1990s, Darnell exhibited in New York City in SoHo and Tribeca. He has also exhibited in Hong Kong, Singapore, Korea, Argentina, and Europe. He exhibited in Barcelona in 2016.

During a 1995 exhibition at the Fernando Alcolea Gallery in Barcelona, a writeup in El País described his work as being "painted with an extreme manual dexterity, something, on the one hand, typical of North American painters, based in the Leonardesque principle suggesting innumerable images starting with stains and in this case, effects of luminosity." The article went on to state "Occasionally, it reflects a mystic atmosphere by means of diffused forms which resemble clouds, other times, suggesting hollow waves, or on the contrary, lights more recognizable closer to candles." Like L'independant, it compared his technique with that of Richter, and his preoccupation with light to that of Bleckner, but also referred to him as an echo of German Romantic landscape painter Caspar David Friedrich.
