= Ken Castleman =

American electrical engineer

Kenneth R. Castleman is a retired NASA engineer who now lives in League City, Texas. He holds B.S, M.S. and Ph.D. degrees in electrical engineering from The University of Texas at Austin. He was a Senior Scientist at NASA's Jet Propulsion Laboratory from 1970 through 1985. During that time he headed the Automated Light Microscope project, which paved the way for landing an intelligent microscope on Mars, and he was inducted into the National Space Foundation's Space Technology Hall of Fame. He also served on the faculty at Caltech and on the research staff at USC and at UCLA.

In 1984, Castleman teamed up with Donald Winkler of the NASA Johnson Space Center and founded Perceptive Systems, Inc (PSI) in Houston, Texas. That company manufactured automated microscope systems for use in genetic diagnosis and sold them internationally. PSI was later reformed as Perceptive Scientific Instruments, Inc. (PSII) and eventually sold to IRIS International in 1996. IRIS established it as a Research and Development Center under the name Advanced Digital Imaging Research (ADIR), with Dr. Castleman as president. He retired in 2008.

Castleman is the author of the textbooks Digital Image Processing (1979) ISBN 0-13-212365-7, Digital Image Processing (1996) ISBN 0-13-211467-4 and a co-editor of Microscope Image Processing (2008) ISBN 978-0-12-372578-3. The 1996 book has been translated int Japanese and Chinese and is used in universities internationally. He is also the author or co-author of four patents and more than sixty scientific articles.

Castleman is an authority in the field of image processing and pattern recognition. In 1986 and again in 2003, he was called in by NASA to assist the investigations into the Challenger and Columbia space shuttle accidents. He has served on government, industrial, and university advisory committees and has testified as an expert witness in a number of patent lawsuits.
