= List of University of Texas at Austin faculty =

This list of University of Texas at Austin faculty includes current and former instructors and administrators of the University of Texas at Austin (UT Austin), a major research university located in Austin, Texas that is the flagship institution of the University of Texas System. Founded in 1883, the university has had the fifth largest single-campus enrollment in the nation as of Fall 2006 (and had the largest enrollment in the country from 1997 to 2003), with over 50,000 undergraduate and graduate students and 16,500 faculty and staff. It currently holds the largest enrollment of all colleges in the state of Texas.

== Administration ==
Name	Department	Service	Notability	Alumnus	Reference
Jay Hartzell	Administration	2020–2025	President of the University of Texas at Austin	No	

== School of Architecture ==
Name	School	Service	Notability	Alumnus	Reference
Michael Benedikt	Architecture		Professor, Hal Box Endowed Chair in Urbanism, Distinguished Professor of the Association of Collegiate Schools of Architecture (ACSA), director of the Center for American Architecture and Design	No	
Samuel E. Gideon	Architecture, Architectural History (Texas)	1931–1945		No	
Juan Miró	Architecture		Associate dean for Undergraduate Programs, David Bruton, Jr. Centennial Professor in Urban Design, Distinguished Teaching Professor, Academy of Distinguished Teachers University of Texas, and director of Studio Mexico	No	
Steven Moore	Architecture		Bartlett Cocke Regents Professor in Architecture	No	
Lawrence Speck	Architecture		Professor, the W. L. Moody, Jr. Centennial Professor in Architecture, and Distinguished Teaching Professor	No	

== Moody College of Communication ==
Name	Department	Service	Notability	Alumnus	Reference
John A. Daly	Communication		Professor, publisher	No	
Matthew McConaughey	Radio-Television-Film	2019–present	Film degree, University of Texas at Austin, 1993; visiting co-teacher for Script to Screen film production since 2015; Academy Award-winning actor with production of over 50 films	Yes	

== College of Education ==
Name	Department	Service	Notability	Alumnus	Reference
Oscar Mink	Curriculum and Instruction	1973–2004	Assistant professor, Cornell University, Ithaca, New York, 1961–1964; senior scientist, manager, Management & Executive Development, Xerox Corporation, Rochester, 1964–1966; associate professor, director division clinical studies West Virginia University, Morgantown, 1966–1970; associate professor, consultant, West Virginia College Graduate Studies, Institute, 1972–1973; professor, University Texas, Austin, from 1973; consultant, Telecom, Australia, since 1988	No	

== Cockrell School of Engineering ==
Name	Department	Service	Notability	Alumnus	Reference
Willis Adcock	Electrical Engineering	1986–1993	Assisted with invention of the silicon transistor and integrated circuit; fellow of AAAS and IEEE; US National Academy of Engineering	No	
Alan Bovik	Electrical Engineering	1984–2025	Invented visual quality measurement, monitoring, and control tools used throughout the global photographic, television, cinematic, streaming, and social media industries; IEEE Edison Medal; John Fritz Medal; Primetime Emmy Award; Technology and Engineering Emmy Award; RPS Progress Medal; IEEE Fourier Award; Edwin H. Land Medal; US National Academy of Engineering	No	
Edith Clarke	Electrical Engineering	1947–1957	First female faculty member of electrical engineering in the US; power engineer; inventor of Clarke Calculator and method of symmetrical components; fellow of IEEE; Society of Women Engineers Achievement Award	No	
Donglei Fan	Mechanical Engineering	2010–present	Principal investigator of the Nanomaterial Innovation Lab; developed techniques for moving nanostructures; built fast nanomotors	No	
John B. Goodenough	Mechanical Engineering and Electrical Engineering	1986–present	Research led to the first lithium-ion battery; Nobel Prize in Chemistry; Charles Stark Draper Prize; Japan Prize; National Medal of Science; Enrico Fermi Award; Copley Medal; US National Academy of Engineering	No	
Moriba K. Jah	Aerospace Engineering and Engineering Mechanics	2017–present	Disruptive research in Space Situational Awareness, Astrodynamics, Space Traffic Management, and Space Security; director of Computational Astronautical Sciences and Technologies; Macarthur Fellow; Distinguished Scholar at the Robert S. Strauss Center for International Security and Law; International Academy of Astronautics	No	
Robert M. Metcalfe	Electrical Engineering	2011–present	Inventor of Ethernet; founded 3Com Corporation; recipient of ACM Turing Award in 2023, IEEE Alexander Graham Bell Medal in 1988, IEEE Medal of Honor in 1996, National Medal of Technology in 2005; inducted into the National Inventors Hall of Fame in 2007; Fellow Award from the Computer History Museum in 2008; US National Academy of Engineering	No	
Yale Patt	Electrical Engineering	1999–present	Breakthroughs in computer architecture to make faster processors; inventor of the WOS module; the first complex logic gate implemented on a single piece of silicon; fellow of ACM and IEEE; US National Academy of Engineering	No	
Nicholas A. Peppas	Biomedical Engineering	?-present	Pioneer in drug delivery, biomaterials, hydrogels and nanobiotechnology; US National Academy of Engineering	No	
Michael Webber	Mechanical Engineering	2006–present	Deputy director of the university's Energy Institute; host of PBS's Energy at the Movies	Yes	

== College of Fine Arts ==
Name	Department	Service	Notability	Alumnus	Reference
Robert Freeman	Butler School of Music	Dean of the College of Fine Arts (1999–2006); Susan Menefee Ragan Regents Professor of Fine Arts (2006–present)	Dean of the Eastman School of Music at the University of Rochester, 1972–1996; president of the New England Conservatory 1996–1999; performed as a concert pianist throughout North America and Europe; has published on topics related to 18th-century music history and music education	No	
Jerry Junkin	Butler School of Music	Director of Bands at the Butler School of Music, head of the Conducting Division (1988–present)	Music director and conductor of the Dallas Winds and the Hong Kong Wind Philharmonia; principal guest conductor of the Senzoku Gakuen College of Music Wind Symphony; previously president of the Big XII Band Director's Association, the College Band Directors National Association, and president of the American Bandmasters Association	Yes	
Beili Liu	Art and Art History	Professor, Regents' Outstanding Teaching Professor, First Year Core Program director	University of Texas System Regents' Outstanding Teaching Professor; served as the First Year Core Program director 2011–2013 and 2018–2020; 2016 Joan Mitchell Painters and Sculptors Grant recipient; 2018 Texas State Artist in 3D medium	No	

== School of Information ==
Name	Department	Service	Notability	Alumnus	Reference
Loriene Roy		1987–present	Former president of the American Library Association	No	
Roberta I. Shaffer		1999–2001	Law Librarian of Congress; former dean	No	
Brooke Sheldon		1991–1996	Former president of the American Library Association; former dean	No	

== Jackson School of Geosciences ==
Name	Department	Service	Notability	Alumnus	Reference
Sharon Mosher	Dean's Office	2009–2020	Dean, William Stamps Farish Chair	No	
Claudia Mora	Dean's Office	2020-2026	Dean, President Geological Society of America 2016-17	No	
Daniel (Danny) Stockli	Dean's Office	2026-present		No	

== School of Law ==
Name	Department	Service	Notability	Alumnus	Reference
Ted Cruz	Law	2004–2009	Future US senator and a 2016 candidate for the Republican nomination for president of the United States	No	
William Willard Gibson Jr.	Law	1965–1998	Provost of Judicial Education with the Texas Supreme Court for 1992–1993	Yes	

== College of Liberal Arts ==
Name	Department	Service	Notability	Alumnus	Reference
Simone Browne	Sociology	2007–present	Author of Dark Matters: On the Surveillance of Blackness	No	
Mounira M. Charrad	Sociology	2000–present	Political sociologist	No	
Elizabeth Cullingford	English	1982–present	Jane Weinert Blumberg Chair in English Literature since 2011, head of department since 2006	No	
Samuel D. Gosling	Psychology	1999–present	Personality and social psychologist	No	
Linda Dalrymple Henderson	Art History	1978–present	David Bruton, Jr. Centennial Professor in Art History Emeritus	No	
Lee M. Hollander	Germanic Studies	1920–1968	Old Norse scholar, head of department	No	
Aletha C. Huston	Psychology	1996–present	Professor; president of the Society for Research in Child Development	No	
Frances Karttunen	Linguistics Research Center	1968–2000	Academic linguist and researcher on Uto-Aztecan and Finno-Ugric languages; historian of Mesoamerican literature and Nantucket local history	No	
James Loehlin	English	1999–2023	Marshall Scholar; former director of Shakespeare at Winedale; Shakespeare at Winedale Regents Professor; literary historian	Yes	
Jerome Loving	English		Professor of American Literature and Culture	No	
Jeffrey L. Meikle	History	1979–present	Stiles Professor in American Studies Emeritus	Yes	
Harry Moore	Sociology	1937–1966	Sociolologist and researcher	Yes	
David Oshinsky	Sociology	2002–2013	Historian and winner of the 2006 Pulitzer Prize for History for Polio: An American Story	No	
James W. Pennebaker	Psychology	1997–present	Social psychologist	Yes	
Mark Regnerus	Sociology	2007–present	Sociolologist and researcher	No	

== Lyndon B. Johnson School of Public Affairs ==
Name	Department	Service	Notability	Alumnus	Reference
Carolyn Heinrich	Center for Health and Social Policy (CHASP)	2011–present	Sid Richardson Professor of Public Affairs	No	

== McCombs School of Business ==
Name	Department	Service	Notability	Alumnus	Reference
Thomas W. Gilligan	Dean's Office	2008–present	Dean, Centennial Chair in Business Leadership	No	
Leigh McAlister	Marketing	1987–present	Executive director, Marketing Science Institute	No	
Steve Salbu	Bobbie and Coulter R. Sublett Centennial Endowed Professor; associate dean for graduate programs	1990–2006	Dean emeritus of the Scheller College of Business at the Georgia Institute of Technology (2006–2014)	No	
Robert C. Solomon	Ethics	1972–2007	Chairman, Hegel Society of America	No	
Andrew B. Whinston	IROM	1988–present	Hugh Roy Cullen Centennial Chair in Business Administration; director of the Center for Research in Electronic Commerce	No	

== College of Natural Sciences ==
Name	Department	Service	Notability	Alumnus	Reference
Robert S. Boyer	Computer Science	1981–2008	Co-inventor of the Boyer–Moore string-search algorithm; co-creator of the Nqthm and ACL2 theorem provers	Yes	
Molly S. Bray	Pediatrics	2013	Geneticist, chair of the Department of Nutritional Sciences and Susan T. Jastrow Chair for Excellence in Nutritional Sciences	No	
Ruth Buskirk	Biology	1990–present	Molecular genetics, microbiology	No	
K. Mani Chandy	Computer Science	1970–1989	Distributed computing, including the Chandy-Lamport Algorithm for the determination of consistent global states	No	
Edsger W. Dijkstra	Computer Science	1984–2000	Numerous foundational contributions to various computing disciplines, especially programming languages, formal verification, and distributed computing; Turing Award for fundamental contributions in the area of programming languages; ACM Fellow	No	
Livia S. Eberlin	Chemistry	2016–present	Co-inventor of the "MasSpec Pen", MacArthur "Genius" Grant and Sloan Research Fellowship	No	
E. Allen Emerson	Computer Science	?-present	Turing Award for "developing model checking into a highly effective verification technology, widely adopted in the hardware and software industries"	Yes	
Katherine Freese	Physics	2019–present	Winner of the 2019 Lilienfeld Prize	No	
Kristen L. Grauman	Computer Science	2007–present	Professor; researcher, computer vision and machine learning; elected to UT's Academy of Distinguished Teachers in 2017	No	
A. M. Harun-ar-Rashid	Physics	1975	Quantum field theory, relativity, mechanics	No	
David M. Hillis	Biology	1987–present	1999 MacArthur Fellow	No	
Simon S. Lam	Computer Science	1977–present	Co-inventor of Secure Sockets Layer; ACM Fellow; elected to the National Academy of Engineering	No	
J Strother Moore	Computer Science	1981–1988, 1997–present	Co-inventor of the Boyer–Moore string-search algorithm; co-creator of the Nqthm and ACL2 theorem provers; ACM Fellow; elected to the National Academy of Engineering; department chair 2001–2009	No	
Nancy A. Moran	Integrative Biology	2013–present	Fellow of the American Academy of Arts and Sciences; elected to the National Academy of Sciences; 2010 winner of the International Prize for Biology	Yes	
Lili Qiu	Computer Science	2005–present	Elected as an ACM Fellow in 2018 for "contributions to the design and analysis of wireless network protocols and mobile systems", known for her research on wireless networks	No	[59]
Sahotra Sarkar	Integrative Biology	1990–present	Specialist in the history and philosophy of science	No	
E. C. George Sudarshan	Theoretical Physics	1969–2018	Glauber–Sudarshan P representation, Lindbladian, Tachyon, Spin–statistics theorem, quantum Zeno effect	No	
Karen Uhlenbeck	Mathematics	1987–2014	Recipient of the 2019 Abel Prize; held Sid W. Richardson Foundation Regents Chair in her time at the University of Texas at Austin; in 2000, won the National Medal of Science	No	
Robert van de Geijn	Computer Science	1987–present		No	
Rachel Ward	Mathematics	2011–present	Received the IMA Prize in Mathematics and Applications in 2016; co-researcher on developing efficient algorithms using limited data	Yes	
Steven Weinberg	Physics	1982–2021	Nobel laureate, author	No	

- Yuval Ne'eman (1925–2006), Israeli physicist, politician, and president of Tel Aviv University

=== Accounting and finance ===
- Michael Clement – KPMG Centennial professor

=== Administration ===
- Eugene C. Barker – chairman, Department of History (Barker History Center)
- Darlene Grant – associate dean of Graduate Studies
- William Powers, Jr. – law professor, president of the University of Texas at Austin
- Lawrence G. Sager – dean, School of Law
- James Steinberg – dean, LBJ School of Public Affairs
- Ben G. Streetman – dean, Cockrell School of Engineering
- Paul Woodruff – dean of Undergraduate Studies

=== Arts and entertainment ===
- Chad Oliver – science fiction and Western writer
- Ellen Spiro – documentary filmmaker
- Louis Alexander Waldman – art historian

=== Business ===
- George Kozmetsky – founder of the IC² Institute and former dean of the McCombs School of Business

=== Education ===
- Marye Anne Fox – chemist, chancellor of University of California, San Diego and formerly North Carolina State University
- Robert L. Mills – educator; former president of Georgetown College, Kentucky

=== History, archive, and library science ===
- Eugene C. Barker – Texas historian, chair of the history department, academic journal editor
- Nettie Lee Benson – historian, archivist, and the namesake of the Benson Latin American Collection
- Daina Ramey Berry – History Department chair, historian specializing in gender, slavery, and black women
- H. W. Brands – author, historian, Jack S. Blanton, Sr. chair of history
- Walter L. Buenger – historian of the American South
- Carlos Castañeda – historian, librarian, and archivist
- Robert Cotner – historian, biographer of James Stephen Hogg
- Robert A. Divine – historian
- Louis Tuffly Ellis
- Toyin Falola – author and historian specializing in African studies
- Joe Bertram Frantz – historian, biographer
- George Pierce Garrison – one of the founding faculty members of the Department of History
- A. G. Hopkins – professor emeritus, economic history
- Madeline Y. Hsu – Asian-American and Chinese American history
- Brian P. Levack – professor emeritus, early modern Europe
- Philippa Levine – historian specializing in gender, race, and science; Walter Prescott Webb Professor of History and Ideas
- Standish Meacham – historian
- Steven Mintz – historian
- Joan Neuberger – Russian and Soviet history
- David Oshinsky – professor emeritus
- Charles W. Ramsdell – historian
- Jeremi Suri – historian, Mack Brown Distinguished Chair for Global Affairs
- Ann Twinam – professor emeritus, historian, Colonial Latin America
- Walter Prescott Webb – historian of Texas and the American West
- Amelia Worthington Williams – Texas historian

=== Journalism and publishing ===
- Gail Caldwell
- J. Frank Dobie – American folklorist, writer, and columnist
- Marvin Olasky – journalist and conservative pundit

=== Law and government ===
- James K. Galbraith – head of the University of Texas Inequality Project at the LBJ School of Public Affairs
- Barbara Jordan – first black woman from a Southern state to serve in the U.S. House
- Gretchen Ritter – professor of government at UT Austin 1992–2013
- Oran Milo Roberts – governor of Texas 1879–1883
- T. K. Seung – professor of philosophy, government, and law

=== Languages and literature ===
- J. Frank Dobie – folklorist, newspaper columnist
- Américo Paredes – folklorist, novelist

=== Philosophy ===
- Robert S. Boyer – professor of philosophy, computer science, and math
- Jonathan Dancy – professor of philosophy
- Robert Kane – professor of philosophy
- Brian Leiter – professor of philosophy and law
- Louis H. Mackey – professor of philosophy
- Aloysius Martinich – professor of philosophy, world-renowned for his knowledge of Thomas Hobbes
- Mark Sainsbury – professor of philosophy
- T. K. Seung – professor of philosophy, government, and law
- Tara Smith – professor of philosophy
- Galen Strawson – professor of philosophy
- Paul Woodruff – professor of philosophy

=== Science and technology ===
- Scott Aaronson – computer scientist and blogger
- Milo Backus – geophysicist
- Eric J. Barron – former dean of College of Geosciences; current director of National Center for Atmospheric Research
- Volker Bromm – astronomer
- Adi Bulsara, PhD, 1978 (physics) – leading physicist in the area of nonlinear dynamics
- Alan Cline – computer scientist
- Franklin C. Crow – computer scientist
- Bryce DeWitt – physicist, co-developed Wheeler-DeWitt equation ("wave function of the Universe")
- Cécile DeWitt-Morette – mathematical physicist
- Gordon Gunter – instructor in physiology (1939–1945), then researcher (1945–1949), acting director (1949–1954) and director (1954–1955) of the University of Texas Institute of Marine Science at Port Aransas and editor of Publications of the Institute of Marine Science (1950–1955); influential fisheries scientist who pioneered the study of fisheries in the northern Gulf of Mexico
- G.B. Halsted – mathematician
- Clark Hubbs – ichthyologist
- William H. Jefferys – astronomer
- Zhimin Lu – biologist and oncologist
- Chris Mack – photolithographer
- Hans Mark – aerospace engineer, formerdDeputy administrator at NASA and Secretary of the Air Force
- Thomas Harrison Montgomery, Jr. – zoologist
- Dana Moshkovitz – computer scientist
- Hermann Joseph Muller – geneticist, Nobel laureate in Physiology or Medicine
- Ilya Prigogine – physicist and chemist, Nobel laureate in Chemistry
- Bill Schelter – mathematician, Lisp developer
- Roy Schwitters – physicist, former director of the now-defunct Superconducting Super Collider
- Elliot See – astronaut
- Jonathan Sessler – chemist, pioneering work on expanded porphyrins
- John Tate – mathematician, Wolf Prize in Mathematics
- Harry Vandiver – mathematician
- John Archibald Wheeler – physicist, Wolf Prize in Physics, coined the term 'black hole'
- Robert E. Wyatt – chemist

=== Social sciences ===
- Walter Dean Burnham – political scientist
- David Buss – evolutionary psychology
- Mounira M. Charrad – political sociologist
- Madonna Constantine – counseling psychologist
- Scott Freeman – economist
- James K. Galbraith – economist
- Michael G. Hall – historian
- Ian Hancock – linguist and Romani scholar
- Milton W. Humphreys – first professor of Latin and Greek at UT Austin, 1883–1887
- Thomas Pangle – professor of government
- Linda Schele – expert in the field of Maya epigraphy and iconography
- T. K. Seung – professor of philosophy, government, and law
- Christen A. Smith – associate professor of anthropology
- John Traphagan – anthropology
- Philip L. White – professor of Colonial America and Nationality, 1955–2000; political activist and academic free-speech leader
- Luis Zayas – professor of Psychiatry

== See also ==
- List of University of Texas at Austin presidents
- List of University of Texas at Austin alumni
