= John Daly =

John Daly primarily refers to:

- John Daly (golfer) (born 1966), American professional golfer
- John Charles Daly (1914–1991), American radio and television newsman and host of the TV panel game show What's My Line?

John Daly may also refer to:

== Entertainment ==
- John Daly (producer) (1937–2008), British movie producer and director of The Big Bang
- John Daly (Irish TV presenter), Northern Irish chat show host

== Politics ==
- John Corry Wilson Daly (1796–1878), first mayor of Stratford, Ontario
- John Daly (Irish politician, born 1834) (1834–1888), Irish Nationalist member of parliament for Cork City
- John Daly (Fenian) (1845–1916), Irish revolutionary and member of the Irish Republican Brotherhood
- John Daly (Irish politician, born 1867) (1867–1932), represented Cork in the 1920s
- John Daly (Australian politician) (1891–1942), Australian lawyer and politician
- J. Burrwood Daly (John Burrwood Daly, 1872–1939), U.S. representative from Pennsylvania
- John B. Daly (New York politician) (1929–1999), New York politician

== Sports ==
- John Daly (footballer, born 1870) (1870–1913), South Australian hall of fame footballer
- John Daly (runner) (1880–1969), Irish athlete who won an Olympic silver medal
- John Daly (footballer, born 1890) (1890–1968), Australian footballer for Melbourne
- John Daly (rugby) (1917–1988), Irish rugby union and rugby league footballer of the 1940s and 1950s
- John Daly (swimmer) (born 1956), Puerto Rican former swimmer
- John Daly (skeleton racer) (born 1985), American skeleton racer
- John Daly (soccer coach), English American college soccer coach
- John Fintan Daly, Irish Gaelic football coach and player
- John Daly (Gaelic footballer), Irish footballer for Galway

== Other ==
- John Daly (gambler) (1838–1906), New York City criminal
- John Daly (outlaw) (1839–1864), American Western outlaw
- John Donald Daly (1841–1923), American businessman and landowner, for whom Daly City, California, is named
- John Daly (bishop) (1901–1985), colonial Anglican bishop
- John W. Daly (1933–2008), American biochemist
- John Daly (academic) (1936–2018), Australian academic, sports historian, and athletics coach
- John Lawrence Daly (1943–2004), self-declared "Greenhouse skeptic"
- John Daly (trade unionist) (1930–1999), British trade union leader
- John Daly (American media personality, born 1955), 1990s American journalist
- John A. Daly, American professor of communication
- John Daly II (born 2003), American amateur golfer
- John Daly, gang member in the 1963 robbery of a Royal Mail train
- John Daly (cocktail), an alcoholic mixed drink, named after American golfer John Daly

== See also ==
- Jack Daly (disambiguation)
- John Daley (disambiguation)
- John Dailey (disambiguation)
- Jon Daly (footballer) (born 1983), retired Irish footballer
- Jon Daly, American actor and comedian
