= Michael Hall =

Michael or Mike Hall may refer to:

== Performing arts ==
- Michael Hall (actor, born 1926) (1926–2020), American actor
- Michael Hall (English musician) (1932–2012), English violinist and conductor
- Anthony Michael Hall (Michael Anthony Hall, born 1968), American actor
- Michael Hall (Texas musician) (fl. 1985–present), American singer-songwriter
- Michael C. Hall (born 1971), American actor
- Mike Hall (bassist) (born 1989), American bassist

== Politics ==
- Michael H. Hall (1890–1957), Wisconsin state assemblyman
- Mike Hall (West Virginia politician) (born 1948), member of the West Virginia Senate and House of Delegates
- Mike Hall (British politician) (born 1952), Labour member of Parliament

== Science ==
- Michael B. Hall (fl. 1966–present), American chemist
- Michael N. Hall (born 1953), American and Swiss molecular biologist

== Sports ==
- Michael Hall (cricketer) (1935–2019), English cricketer
- Mike Hall (powerlifter) (born 1956), American powerlifter
- Mike Hall (rugby union) (born 1965), Welsh rugby union international
- Mike Hall (speed skater) (born 1970), Canadian speed skater
- Michael Hall (archer) (born 1975), British Paralympic archer
- Mike Hall (cyclist) (1981–2017), British cyclist and race organiser
- Mike Hall (sportscaster) (born 1982), American sportscaster
- Mike Hall (basketball) (born 1984), American-Irish basketball player
- Mike Hall Jr. (born 2003), American football player

== Others ==
- Michael G. Hall (born 1926), American historian
- Mike Hall (journalist) (born 1974), British journalist

== Schools ==
- Michael Hall (school), independent school in East Sussex, England

== See also ==
- Mickey Hall (Emmerdale), a character in a British soap opera
