= Luis Zayas =

Luis Zayas may refer to:

- Luis Zayas (athlete) (born 1997), Cuban high jumper
- Luis Zayas (professor), American psychiatry professor
