= Ernest Winkler =

American historian and librarian (1875–1960)

Ernest William Winkler
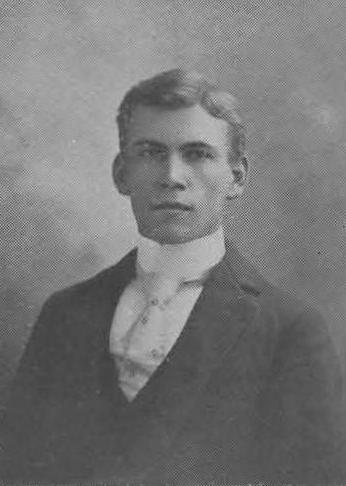
- Born: January 21, 1875; Bell County, Texas, US
- Died: February 8, 1960 (aged 85); Austin, Texas, US
- Spouse: Johanna Tabea Kuehne
- Parents: Charles Winkler; Kathrina Louisa Huber Winkler

Academic background
- Education: University of Texas; University of Wisconsin
- Thesis: "The History of the Cherokee Indians of Texas" (1900)
- Influences: George Pierce Garrison, Lester Bugbee, Eugene C. Barker, Frederick Jackson Turner

Academic work
- Discipline: History
- Sub-discipline: American history, Texas history
- Institutions: University of Texas; Texas State Library; Southwestern Historical Quarterly
- Notable students

Ernest Winkler (1875–1960) was a historian and librarian at the University of Texas.

== Early life and family history ==
Ernest Winkler was born on January 21, 1875, the son, and eldest child, of Charles August and Kathrina Louisa Huber Winkler. His birthplace was located in an area of rural Texas along the frontier dividing Bell County and Coryell County known as The Grove. The Winklers maintained a farm in Bell County, where they reared ten children. Charles Winkler and his brother William settled The Grove in the 1870s, and established a German Methodist Church there despite their affiliation with Lutheranism. Their parents, August and Maria Winkler, immigrated to Texas in the 1850s from Prussia. Their ancestors were Wendish people from Lusatia, and the Winklers settled with other Wends in Lee County, Texas.

Winkler attended a local school established by his own family. He started higher education at Blinn College in 1892, a liberal arts college in Brenham, Texas, where he studied education. He completed the normal school in two years, and after teaching at a local public school for a year, he briefly attended the University of Texas. His education in Austin was interrupted by a lack of funding, though, and he returned to teaching before earning his baccalaureate in 1899 and master's degree the next year, capped by his thesis, "The History of the Cherokee Indians of Texas.

== Career ==
Winkler's academic career began as a history fellow at the University of Texas. In 1899, the university acquired the Bexar Archives, a collection of written artifacts which documented Spanish and Mexican rule in Texas. In the summer of 1900, Lester Bugbee assigned the task of cataloging these documents to Winkler, where he obtained his on-the-job-training on preserving and archiving old papers. He taught history at Blinn College for the fall term. In 1902, he studied briefly under Frederick Jackson Turner at the University of Wisconsin–Madison. He returned to Blinn the next year, while also working for the Texas State Historical Association as a administrator, editor, and writer. During this period, he also expanded his paper on the Cherokee and prepared a version of it for publication.

== Death ==
Winkler died on February 8, 1960, in Austin. He is interred at a cemetery near the line separating Coryell County, Texas, and McLennan County, Texas. He was survived by his wife and five children.

== Bibliography ==
Utley, Dan (2013). Cox, Patrick L.; Hendrickson, Kenneth E. Jr. (eds.). Writing the Story of Texas. Austin: University of Texas University Press. pp. 67–83. ISBN 978-0-292-74537-7.
