= Bromm =

Bromm may refer to:

== Surname ==
- Curt Bromm (born 1945), American politician of Nebraska
- Hal Bromm (born 1947), American designer and architect
- Terri Bromm, Canadian politician in Saskatchewan
- Volker Bromm, American astronomer
