= George Garrison =

George Garrison may refer to:

- George Tankard Garrison (1835–1889), U.S. Representative from Virginia
- George Pierce Garrison (1853–1910), American historian
