= Fenske =

Fenske is a surname. Notable people with the surname include:

- August Fenske (1858–1938), American politician
- Dieter Fenske (born 1942), German inorganic chemist
- Doug Fenske (born 1982), American record producer, recording engineer, mix engineer, and remixer
- Jacquie Fenske (born 1955 or 1956), Canadian politician
- Kurt Fenske (1930–2022), German economist and politician
- Raja Fenske (born 1988), American actor
- Richard F. Fenske (1929–2011), American chemist
