= Fenske–Hall method =

The Fenske–Hall method is a molecular orbital method in computational chemistry, usually applied to inorganic compounds. This method was developed in Richard F. Fenske's research group at the University of Wisconsin. The method is named after Fenske and Michael B. Hall, who co-authored the last paper in 1972 in its development.

The Fenske–Hall method is derived from Roothaan equations. It is ab initio in the sense that it does not make use of parameters from experimental data (see semi-empirical quantum chemistry method). Electronic exchange is considered, but electron correlation is not. It is able to predict the shapes of molecular orbitals and their energies that are similar to the more rigorous analysis by density functional theory (DFT), but using less computational resources. As a result, some consider the Fenske–Hall method an approximation to DFT.

== Software ==
Fenske–Hall calculations may be performed by Jimp 2.

== See also ==
- Molecular orbital theory
- Quantum chemistry computer programs
- Semi-empirical quantum chemistry methods
