= Bernie Winkler =

American football player (1925–1990)

- Bernie Winkler, 1947

No. 41
- Position: Tackle

Personal information
- Born: December 5, 1925; The Grove, Texas, U.S.
- Died: June 28, 1990 (aged 64); New Braunfels, Texas, U.S.
- Listed height: 6 ft 1 in (1.85 m)
- Listed weight: 232 lb (105 kg)

Career information
- High school: Temple (TX)
- College: Millsaps, Texas Tech
- NFL draft: 1947: 30th round, 281st overall pick

Career history
- Los Angeles Dons (1948–1949)

Career NFL statistics
- Games: 4
- Stats at Pro Football Reference

Bernie Arthur Winkler (December 5, 1925 – June 28, 1990) was an American professional football player who played at the tackle position. He played college football for Millsaps and Texas Tech and professional football for the Los Angeles Dons.

== Early life ==
Winkler was born in 1925 in The Grove, Texas. He attended and played football at Temple High School in Temple, Texas.

== Military and college football ==
He played college football for Millsaps in 1944 and for Texas Tech in 1943, 1945, 1946, and 1947. He was an All-Border Conference player for two seasons. He also served in the United States Navy.

== Professional football ==
Winkler was drafted by the Philadelphia Eagles in the 30th round (281st pick) of the 1947 NFL draft and by the Los Angeles Dons in the 14th round (85th pick) of the 1948 AAFC Draft. He signed with the Dons in January 1948. He played for the Dons during their 1948 season, appearing in four games.

== Family and later years ==
Winkler was married in 1959 to Carolyn Hansmann. He died in 1990 at age 64 at his home in New Braunfels, Texas.
