= Carolyn Heinrich =

American economist

Carolyn J. Heinrich
- Born: 1967 (age 58–59)

Academic background
- Education: University of Chicago; Beloit College

Academic work
- Discipline: Social policy
- Institutions: University of Texas at Austin; Vanderbilt University; University of Wisconsin-Madison; University of North Carolina at Chapel Hill; University of Chicago
- Scientific career
- Thesis: Public policy and methodological issues in the design and evaluation of employment and training programs at the service delivery area level (1995)
- Doctoral advisor: James Heckman
- Website: UT-Austin Vanderbilt
- Website: Information at IDEAS / RePEc

Carolyn J. Heinrich (born 1967) is the Patricia and Rodes Hart Professor of Public Policy, Education and Economics at Vanderbilt University.

== Career ==
Prior to her appointment at Vanderbilt University, she was the Sid Richardson Professor of Public Affairs, affiliated Professor of Economics, and Director of the Center for Health and Social Policy (CHASP) at the Lyndon B. Johnson School of Public Affairs, University of Texas at Austin. She continues as a research professor at the University of Texas at Austin. She has also held professorships at the University of Wisconsin-Madison, where she served as the Director of the La Follette School of Public Affairs, and the University of North Carolina at Chapel Hill. She received her Ph.D. under the Nobel Laureate James Heckman at the University of Chicago Harris School of Public Policy and her undergraduate degree from Beloit College. She is currently researching a wide breadth of topics, focusing on education, workforce development, social welfare policy, program evaluation, and public management and performance management, allowing her to collaborate with federal, state, and local governments on policy design and program effectiveness. Heinrich received her Bachelor of Arts in International Relations, Economics, and Management from Beloit College in Wisconsin. She earned her Master of Arts in Public Policy at the University of Chicago, where she also earned her Doctor of Philosophy. In 2004, she received the David N. Kershaw Award for distinguished contributions to public policy analysis and management for a person under age 40, and in 2011, she was elected to the National Academy of Public Administration.

== Selected publications ==
- Improving governance: A new logic for empirical research. Georgetown University Press. 2000. ISBN 9780878408528. OCLC 45052661.
- Governance and performance: New perspectives. Georgetown University Press. 2001. ISBN 9780878407989. OCLC 43555035.
- Heinrich, Carolyn J. (2002). "Outcomes-Based Performance Management in the Public Sector: Implications for Government Accountability and Effectiveness". Public Administration Review. 62 (6): 712–725. doi:10.1111/1540-6210.00253.
- Lynn, L. E.; Heinrich, C. J.; Hill, C. J. (2000). "Studying governance and public management: Challenges and prospects". Journal of Public Administration Research and Theory. 10 (2): 233–262. doi:10.1093/oxfordjournals.jpart.a024269. OCLC 4897942407.
- Heckman, James; Heinrich, Carolyn; Smith, Jeffrey (2002). "The Performance of Performance Standards". doi:10.3386/w9002.

== See also ==
- List of University of Texas at Austin faculty
- List of Vanderbilt University people
- List of University of Wisconsin-Madison people
- List of University of Chicago alumni
- List of economists
