= John Dailey =

John Dailey may refer to:

- John Dailey (baseball) (1853–?), American baseball player
- John Dailey (politician) (1867–1929), American politician from Illinois
- John R. Dailey (born 1934), United States Marine Corps general
- John E. Dailey (born 1972), mayor of Tallahassee, Florida

== See also ==
- John Daly (disambiguation)
