= Joe Bertram Frantz =

American historian from Texas (1917–1993)

- Born: January 16, 1917; Dallas, Texas, U.S.
- Died: November 16, 1993 (aged 76); Houston, Texas
- Resting place: Texas State Cemetery in Austin
- Occupations: Historian at University of Texas at Austin and Corpus Christi State University
- Spouse: Four marriages
- Children: Two daughters from first marriage (1939-1979) to former Helen Andrews Boswell; Fourth wife, Betsy Chadderdon Frantz (1990-1993, his death)

Academic background
- Education: University of Texas at Austin
- Thesis: Newspapers of the Republic of Texas
- Doctoral advisor: Walter Prescott Webb
- Other advisors: Eugene C. Barker, William C. Binkly

Academic work
- Era: Republic of Texas
- Discipline: History
- Sub-discipline: American history, Texas history
- Institutions: University of Texas
- Notable students: Louis Tuffly Ellis

Joe Bertram Frantz (January 16, 1917 – November 16, 1993) was a historian from the U.S. state of Texas who specialized in the American West.

== Early life ==
Joe Bertram Frantz was born on January 16, 1917, in Dallas. He was an adopted son of Ezra A. Frantz and the Mary (Buckley) Frantz who reared him in Weatherford, Texas. In 1934, he graduated from Weatherford High School.

Frantz attended the University of Texas at Austin and obtained a bachelor's degree in journalism and a Master of Arts in history there, with the thesis entitled "The newspapers of the Republic of Texas". During his undergraduate tenure at UT, he was a staff member of the Daily Texan newspaper, a member of the Rusk Literary Society, and the Sigma Delta Chi Journalism Honor Society. His first job was as acting advisor and archivist at the San Jacinto Battleground State Historic Site east of Houston, Texas.

== Career ==
After earning a degree in journalism at the University of Texas, Frantz worked as reporter and also worked for his father. Before long, however, returned to the University of Texas and entered a master's program in history. His thesis advisors were Eugene C. Barker and William C. Binkly. In 1940, he completed his thesis titled, "The Newspapers of the Republic of Texas."

In 1943, Frantz joined the United States Navy during World War II. A lieutenant, he was involved in eight engagements as a communications officer in the South Pacific.

In 1948, Frantz earned his Ph.D. from the University of Texas with the dissertation entitled "Infinite pursuit: the story of Gail Borden", a study of the inventor of condensed milk.

With his highest degree in hand, Frantz was then invited to join the University of Texas faculty as an assistant professor. He was elevated in 1953 to associate professor and in 1959 to full professor. In 1959, with Julian E. Choate, he co-authored The American Cowboy: The Myth and the Reality.

During the 1960s, 1970s, and into the 1980s, Frantz continued to teach history while serving on many boards. He was president of the Southwestern Social Science Association (1963), Southern Historical Association (1977–1978), and the Western History Association, (1978–1979). From 1964, he was an advisory board member of the National Park Service for two decades. He was a commissioner for the American Revolution Bicentennial Commission of Texas (1975–1979). He directed the Texas State Historical Association for a decade, leading to the completion of the Volume 3 of the Handbook of Texas in 1976.

Frantz proposed an oral history project to Lyndon Baines Johnson near the end of his presidency. After the President approved of the project and pledged his cooperation, Frantz managed a team of oral historians to record interviews with Johnson, his wife, and many associates of the President. From 1968 until 1974, the Lyndon B. Johnson Oral History Project conducted about 700 interviews. Michael Gillette took over management of the project and added about 500 interviews. Biographers such as Merle Miller, Robert Dallek, and Robert Caro relied on these oral histories to research their books.

After his retirement from the University of Texas, Frantz joined the faculty at Corpus Christi State University in Corpus Christi, Texas, now known as Texas A&M University–Corpus Christi. While teaching in Corpus Christi, he completed two books. One was a memoir of the University of Texas, The Forty-Acre Follies (1983), which was recognized by the Southwestern Booksellers Association as "best nonfiction Texas book of the year. He co-authored a book with Mike Cox about the settlement of Texas titled, Lure of the Land: Texas County Maps and the History of Settlement. The Texas Historical Commission recognized this book with its Fehrenbach Award.

== Personal life ==
In 1939, Frantz married Weatherford, Texas native, Helen Andrews Boswell. They had two daughters.

== Death ==
n November 23, 1993, Frantz died at Hermann Hospital in Houston due to complications from diabetes. He is interred at Texas State Cemetery in Austin.

== Publications ==
Frantz published academic books, journal articles, school textbooks, and popular histories,

=== Books ===
- Gail Borden, Dairyman to a Nation. Norman: University of Oklahoma Press, 1951.
- (with Julian Ernest Choate). The American Cowboy: The Myth and the Reality. Norman: University of Oklahoma Press, 1955.
- (with David G. McComb) Houston, a Students' Guide to Localized History. New York: Teachers College Press, 1971.
- The Driskill Hotel. Austin: Encino Press, 1973.
- Texas: A Bicentennial History. New York: Norton, 1976.
  - later version published as Texas, a History. New York: W.W. Norton, 1984.
- Aspects of the American West: Three Essays. College Station and London: Texas A&M University Press, 1976.
- The Forty-Acre Follies. Austin: Texas Monthly Press, 1983. (history of the University of Texas)
- Texas History Movies: The Story of the Lone Star State. Dallas, Texas: Pepper Jones Martinez, Inc, 1985. ISBN 9780935759006
- (with Mike Cox, and Roger A. Griffin) Lure of the Land: Texas County Maps and the History of Settlement. College Station, for the Texas: Texas General Land Office by Texas A&M University Press, 1988.

=== Juvenile books ===
- Texas and Its History. Dallas: Pepper Jones Martinez, 1978.
- (with James B. Kracht) Texas: The Study of Our State. Glenview, Illinois: Scott, Foresman, 1988.
  - also published in Spanish as Texas, estudio de nuestro estado

== Bibliography ==
- David G., McComb (2013). "Joe B. Frantz". In Cox, Patrick L.; Hendrickson, Kenneth E. Jr (eds.). Writing the Story of Texas. Austin: University of Texas Press. pp. 212–222. ISBN 978-0-292-74537-7. OCLC 809365662.
