= Mounira M. Charrad =

Franco-Tunisian sociologist

- Born: August 10, 1942 (age 84); Tunisia
- Other name: Mounira Maya Charrad

Academic background
- Education: University of Paris; Harvard University
- Doctoral advisor: Ann Swidler

Academic work
- Discipline: Sociology
- Sub-discipline: Political sociology; sociology of gender
- Institutions: University of Texas at Austin
- Doctoral students: Chauntelle Tibbals

Mounira Maya Charrad (born 1942) is a Franco-Tunisian sociologist who serves as associate professor of sociology at the University of Texas at Austin.

She is an author whose work focuses on political sociology, comparative history, gender politics, and the Middle East. Her research has centered on state formation, colonialism, law, citizenship, kinship, and women's rights.

== Early life and education ==
Charrad was born in Tunisia on August 10, 1942. She received an undergraduate degree from the Sorbonne in Paris, France, and a Doctor of Philosophy degree from Harvard University.

== Career ==
Her book States and Women's Rights (2001) considers strategies of state building in kin-based societies and how struggles over state power shaped the expansion or curtailment of women's rights.

Charrad studies conceptions of modernity in legal discourses in the Middle East. Challenging explanations of politics based on a textual approach to religion, she offers instead a focus on social solidarities and where they are grounded (kinship, ethnicity, or other), as for example in her articles "Gender in the Middle East: Islam, State, Agency" and "Central and Local Patrimonialism: State Building in Kin-Based Societies".

Her work has been translated into French and Arabic, and featured on websites including the International Museum of Women and in the media.

Charrad's research has been funded by several grants, including the National Endowment for the Humanities, the Mellon Foundation, the American Association of University Women, and the American Institute of Maghribi Studies.

At the University of Texas at Austin, she is affiliated with the Center for European Studies, the Center for Middle East Studies, the Center for Women's and Gender Studies, the Rapoport Center for Human Rights and Justice, and the Center for Russian, East European, and Eurasian Studies. She also holds a courtesy appointment in the Department of Middle East Studies.

== Recognition ==
Charrad's book States and Women's Rights: The Making of Postcolonial Tunisia, Algeria and Morocco (University of California Press, 2001) won the following awards:

- Distinguished Scholarly Book Award, American Sociological Association
- Best Book on Politics and History Greenstone Award, American Political Science Association
- Distinguished Contribution to Scholarship Award. Outstanding Book in Political Sociology, American Sociological Association, Section on Political Sociology
- Outstanding Scholarly Book in Any Field Hamilton Award, University of Texas at Austin
- Best First Book in the Field of History Award, Phi Alpha Theta, 2002
- Best Book in Sociology Komarovsky Award, Honorable Mention, Eastern Sociological Society, 2003

The book is being translated into French, Arabic, and Chinese.

== Selected other publications ==
- Charrad, Mounira M. (Summer 1997). "Policy shifts: State, Islam, and gender in Tunisia, 1930s–1990s". Social Politics. 4 (2): 284–319. doi:10.1093/sp/4.2.284.

Expanded as: Charrad, Mounira M.; Goeken, Allyson (2006), "Continuity or change: family law and family structure in Tunisia", in Oheneba-Sakyi, Yaw; Takyi, Baffour K. (eds.), African families at the turn of the twenty-first century, Westport, Connecticut: Praeger, ISBN 9780275972745.
Revised and reprinted as: Charrad, Mounira M. (2008), "From nationalism to feminism: family law in Tunisia", in Yount, Kathryn M.; Rashad, Hoda (eds.), Family in the Middle East: Ideational change in Egypt, Iran, and Tunisia, Oxford New York: Routledge, pp. 111–136, ISBN 9780415613415.

- Charrad, Mounira M. (2000), "Becoming a citizen: lineage versus individual in Morocco and Tunisia", in Joseph, Suad (ed.), Gender and citizenship in the Middle East, Syracuse, New York: Syracuse University Press, pp. 70–87, ISBN 9780815628651.
- Charrad, Mounira M. (2007), "Unequal citizenship: Issues of gender justice in the Middle East and North Africa", in Mukhopadhyay, Maitrayee (ed.), Gender justice, citizenship and development, Ottawa, Canada: International Development Research Centre, pp. 233–262. ISBN 9788189884314
- Charrad, Mounira M. (2007). "Contexts, concepts and contentions: Gender legislation in the Middle East". Hawwa: Journal of Women of the Middle East and the Islamic World. 5 (1): 55–72. doi:10.1163/156920807781787635.
- Charrad, Mounira M. (Fall 2007). "Tunisia at the forefront of the Arab world: Two waves of gender legislation". Washington and Lee Law Review. 64 (4). Washington and Lee University School of Law: 1513–1527. Pdf.

Revised and reprinted in Sadiqi, Fatima; Ennaji, Moha (2010). Women in the Middle East and North Africa: agents of change. Oxford New York: Routledge. pp. 105–113. ISBN 9780415573214.

- Charrad, Mounira M. (December 2009). "Kinship, Islam, or oil: culprits of gender inequality?". Politics & Gender (Debate: Oil, Islam, and Women). 5 (4): 546–553. doi:10.1017/S1743923X09990353. S2CID 145108637.
- Charrad, Mounira M. (Guest editor) (November–December 2010). "Women's agency: silences and voices (special issue)". Women's Studies International Forum. 33 (6).

Including: Charrad, Mounira M. (November–December 2010). "Women's agency across cultures: Conceptualizing strengths and boundaries". Women's Studies International Forum. 33 (6): 517–522. doi:10.1016/j.wsif.2010.09.004.

- Charrad, Mounira M. (August 2011). "Gender in the Middle East: Islam, state, agency". Annual Review of Sociology. 37: 417–437. doi:10.1146/annurev.soc.012809.102554.
- Charrad, Mounira M. (Guest editor); Adams, Julia (Guest editor) (July 2011). "Patrimonial power in the modern world (special issue)". The Annals of the American Academy of Political and Social Science. 636 (1). SAGE.

Including: Charrad, Mounira M.; Adams, Julia (July 2011). "Introduction: patrimonialism, past and present". The Annals of the American Academy of Political and Social Science. 636 (1): 6–15. doi:10.1177/0002716211402286. S2CID 220852840.
Including: Charrad, Mounira M. (July 2011). "Central and local patrimonialism: State-building in kin-based societies". The Annals of the American Academy of Political and Social Science. 636 (1): 49–68. doi:10.1177/0002716211401825. S2CID 145693904.

== See also ==
- List of sociologists
- List of University of Texas at Austin faculty
