= John Daley =

John Daley may refer to:

- John Daley (jockey) (1846–?), British jockey
- John Daley (baseball) (1887–1988), American baseball player
- John Daley (RAF officer) (1898–1918), World War I flying ace
- John Daley (cricketer) (1906–1986), English cricketer
- John Daley (boxer) (1909–1963), American boxer and Olympic silver medalist
- John J. Daley (1923–2000), American politician and lieutenant governor of Vermont
- John M. Daley (1923–2015), American politician and member of the Illinois House of Representatives
- John P. Daley (born 1946), American politician and member of the Cook County Board of Commissioners
- John Francis Daley (born 1985), American actor
- John Phillips Daley (1910–1963), U.S. Army lieutenant general

== See also ==
- John Daly (disambiguation)
