= Llerena Friend =

American historian and librarian (1903 – 1995)

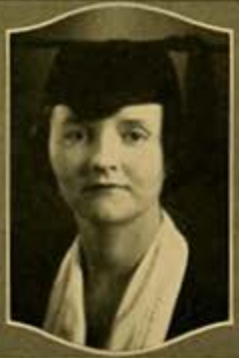
- Friend in 1924
- Born: October 19, 1903; Dublin, Texas, US
- Died: September 8, 1995 (aged 91); Wichita Falls, Texas, US
- Awards: Summerfield Roberts Award; H. Bailey Carroll Award; Texas Library Association Award; Alpha Chi Omega Award of Achievement

Academic background
- Education: University of Texas: BA (1924), MA (1928), PhD (1951)
- Doctoral advisor: Eugene C. Barker

Academic work
- Discipline: History
- Sub-discipline: Texas history
- Institutions: University of Texas; Texas State Historical Association
- Notable works: Sam Houston: The Great Designer (1954), Handbook of Texas (with many other editors)

Llerena Beaufort Friend (October 19, 1903 – September 8, 1995) was an American teacher, historian, and librarian. She studied at the University of Texas, and taught in public schools for about twenty years, after which she had a second career as a librarian. She was the founding director of the Barker Center for Texas History and held that position for nearly two decades. During the same period she taught history courses at the University of Texas. She published a biography on Sam Houston in 1954.

== Early life ==
Llerena Beaufort Friend was born on October 19, 1903, in Dublin, Texas, to Everest MacDonald Friend and Llerena Collinsworth (Perry) Friend. Among the towns she grew up in were Vernon, Wichita Falls, and Electra, Texas. Everest spent much of his time on the railroads as a traveling salesman, and Friend moved with her family a total of twenty-four times. Her mother, also named Llerena, was once admonished by a Methodist preacher for playing music and dancing. She stopped attending church, though she continued to rear her children in the Methodist faith.

Drillers struck oil in Electra in 1911, and Everest moved to set up a retail store to take advantage of the local economic boom. Shortly later, the store burned to the ground. The Friends had been living on the property, so the fire sent the family in search of a new home. The town did not have a local water source or water utility, and it was transported by truck. Water was so scarce that it had to be recycled.

Everest and a business partner set up a new grocery. After a time, the family found a house in Wichita Falls, but Everest remained in Electra. They were reunited when they returned to Electra in 1917, where a new high school was built. Yet they were homeless again after a fire destroyed the roof of their new house. Friend lived in a total of twenty-four different homes during her youth.

Friend graduated from Electra High School out of a class of eighteen students. Next she matriculated at the University of Texas. Among her history professors were Eugene C. Barker and Walter Prescott Webb, and she worked as an assistant to Webb and Professor Frederick Duncalf.

== Career ==
Friend started a career as a school teacher in Vernon, Texas, after earning her baccalaureate degree. She taught public schools for about two decades, mostly at Wichita Falls High School, while splitting her time in graduate school. She worked on her master's degree at the University of Texas, with a hiatus to attend classes at the University of California at Berkeley. The history department hired her to teach a new course on Texas history after she returned to Austin. Webb tapped her to establish an Austin chapter of Junior Historians, for which she led group tours of historic sites in Texas, and coordinated a fundraising effort to establish a monument marking the centennial of the Texan Santa Fe Expedition of 1841. In 1943, Friend joined the original Handbook of Texas project. She shuttled between Austin and Wichita Falls through 1945, as she had returned to teach high school in north Texas. After 1945 she taught some history courses, edited articles for the Quarterly of the Texas State Historical Association, and continued her work on the Handbook of Texas. Meanwhile, she took one graduate course per semester until she completed her course work for a doctorate at the age of forty-seven. By this time, her work for the Handbook of Texas was complete as well, and only a dissertation separated her from a PhD.

Friend embarked on a new career as a librarian, starting as an assistant to Ernest W. Winkler in managing the Texas Collection at the University of Texas. Despite the title, the subject matter of the collection extended to the Old South and the southwest regions, with books, pictures, and scrapbooks among its artifacts. Winkler had overseen most of the growth of the collection, though it was almost as old as the university itself. In 1950 she was assigned as managing director of the new Barker Center for Texas History. Friend started her dissertation on Sam Houston during this period. The subject came through the joint recommendation of Webb and Eugene C. Barker, who both stressed that no biography of Houston had been written since his collected papers had been organized. Austin was an ideal place to conduct research on Houston, giving her access to both the university's and the state's archives. Yet she also traveled to Washington to research collections at the National Archives and the Library of Congress, a trip made possible through a Clara Driscoll Scholarship tendered by the Daughters of the Republic of Texas. She earned her doctorate in 1951. Barker, her dissertation advisor, and Webb, her long-time mentor, both encouraged her to publish her dissertation. The finished work, Sam Houston, the Great Designer, was published in December 1954 by the University of Texas Press. The Sons of the Republic of Texas, who reviewed the book prior to its public release, bestowed upon it the Summerfield G. Robert Award.

Friend was the managing director of the Barker Center for nineteen years until her retirement in 1969. She also taught history courses during her tenure at the library, and the university recognized her as a professor emerita upon her retirement. She was active in several organizations related to learning, including the Philosophical Society of Texas, the Texas Institute of Letters, and the Ashbel Literary Society. Alpha Chi Omega appointed her as chair of its National Academic Standards board. Though Friend did not author any other books, she edited three books, including Webb's Talks in Texas Books, published in 1970. Post-retirement, she received three more awards: the H. Bailey Award and the Texas Library Association Award in 1971, and the Alpha Chi Omega Award of achievement the next year.

Friend remained active during her retirement. She moved permanently to Wichita Falls in 1975, and was a member of the Wichita County Historical Commission. She served the Texas State Historical Records Advisory Board at the invitation of Governor Dolph Briscoe. She frequented many lectures at Midwestern State University.

== Death and legacy ==
Friend died on September 8, 1995, in Wichita Falls. The Special Collections Library at Midwestern State University houses some of her papers.

== Selected works ==
- Friend, Llerena B. (1954). Sam Houston: The Great Designer. Austin: University of Texas Press.
- Friend, Llerena (July 1972). "E. W. Winkler's Speech on Historical Collections of the Southwest". The Southwestern Historical Quarterly. 76 (1): 71–78. JSTOR 30238176.
- Friend, Llerena (October 1973). "Walter Prescott Webb and Book Reviewing". Western Historical Quarterly. 4 (4): 381–404. doi:10.2307/967283. JSTOR 967283.
- Webb, Walter Prescott; Friend, Llerena (1970). Talks on Texas Books. Austin: Texas State Historical Association.
