= The Grove, Texas =

- Unincorporated community
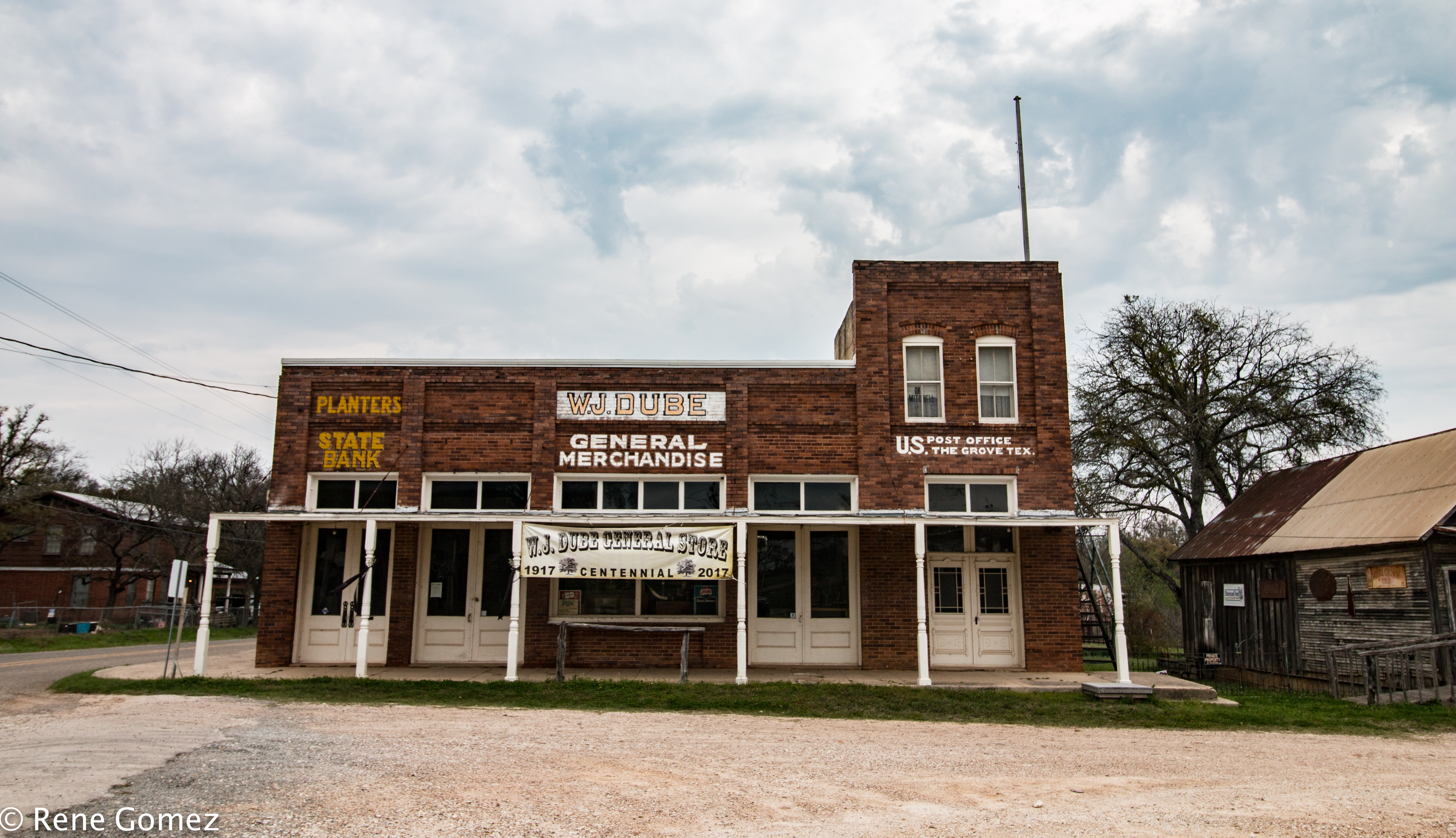
- The Grove

- Location within the state of Texas
- Coordinates: 31°16′24″N 97°31′31″W
- Country: United States
- State: Texas
- County: Coryell
- Time zone: UTC-6 (Central (CST))
  - Summer (DST): UTC-5 (CDT)
- ZIP codes: 76528
- Area code: 254

The Grove is an unincorporated community in Coryell County, Texas, United States. The area is known for its abundance of Texas bluebonnet flowers during the spring. According to the Handbook of Texas, the community had a population of 65 in 2000. It is located within the Killeen-Temple-Fort Hood metropolitan area.

== History ==
It was founded in 1859 and got its name from the nearby live oak tree grove. The community was formerly known as Morrison Grove. The town featured two general stores, a mill, and a gin by the end of the 1860s. The Grove already had Baptist, Methodist, Disciples, and Presbyterian churches when a group of Wendish immigrants moved there in 1870. When the post office was first established, J. B. Coleman served as postmaster. A 150-person village with three general stores, two grocers, and local farmers shipping cotton, hides, and grain existed in the mid-1880s. The Grove was one of the county's wealthiest municipalities by 1900. After being bypassed by State Highway 36 in the 1940s, the hamlet started to dwindle. When Fort Hood was created in the early 1940s, some local farmers were compelled to migrate, and others lost land when the Belton Dam was built in 1953. The development of transportation and the concentration of farmland both led to the downfall of the village. The Grove's population, which was estimated to be 150 in the 1940s, dropped to 140 in the 1950s and 1960s and to 65 by 1970, where it stayed until the year 2000. In the 1980s, the hamlet was identified on county highway maps by a church and several businesses.

== Geography ==
The Grove is located on Farm to Market Road 1114 and Texas State Highway 36, 16 mi (26 km) southeast of Gatesville, 36 mi (58 km) southwest of Waco, and 85 mi (137 km) north of Austin via Interstate 35 in eastern Coryell County. It is also a two-hour drive from the Dallas-Fort Worth metroplex.

== Education ==
In 1904, it had a two-teacher school with 60 students, and in 1908, a Lutheran school was established there. In 1948, The Grove's public school closed, and kids were bused to schools in neighboring towns. Due to a shortage of students, the Lutheran school was forced to close in 1962. Today, the community is served by the Gatesville Independent School District.

== Notable people ==
- Ernest Winkler, historian and librarian from the University of Texas, was born here.
- Albert J. Winkler, viticulture professor, was born here.
- Bernie Winkler, football player for Texas Tech.

== Gallery ==
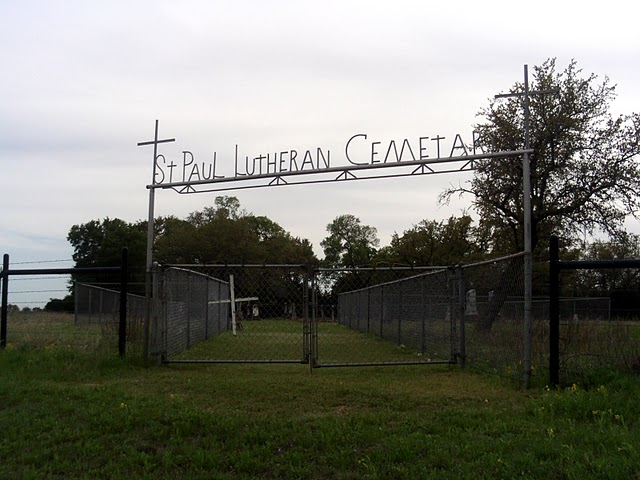
The St. Paul Lutheran Church Cemetery at The Grove has graves from many of the early pioneers of the community.

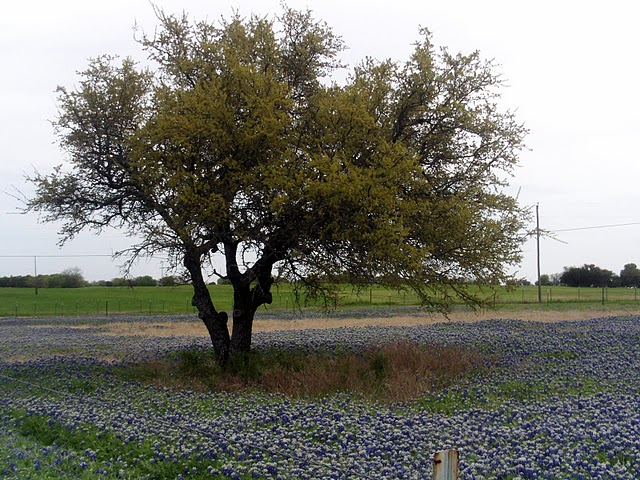
A field of Texas bluebonnets in The Grove
