= Chauntelle Tibbals =

American sociologist

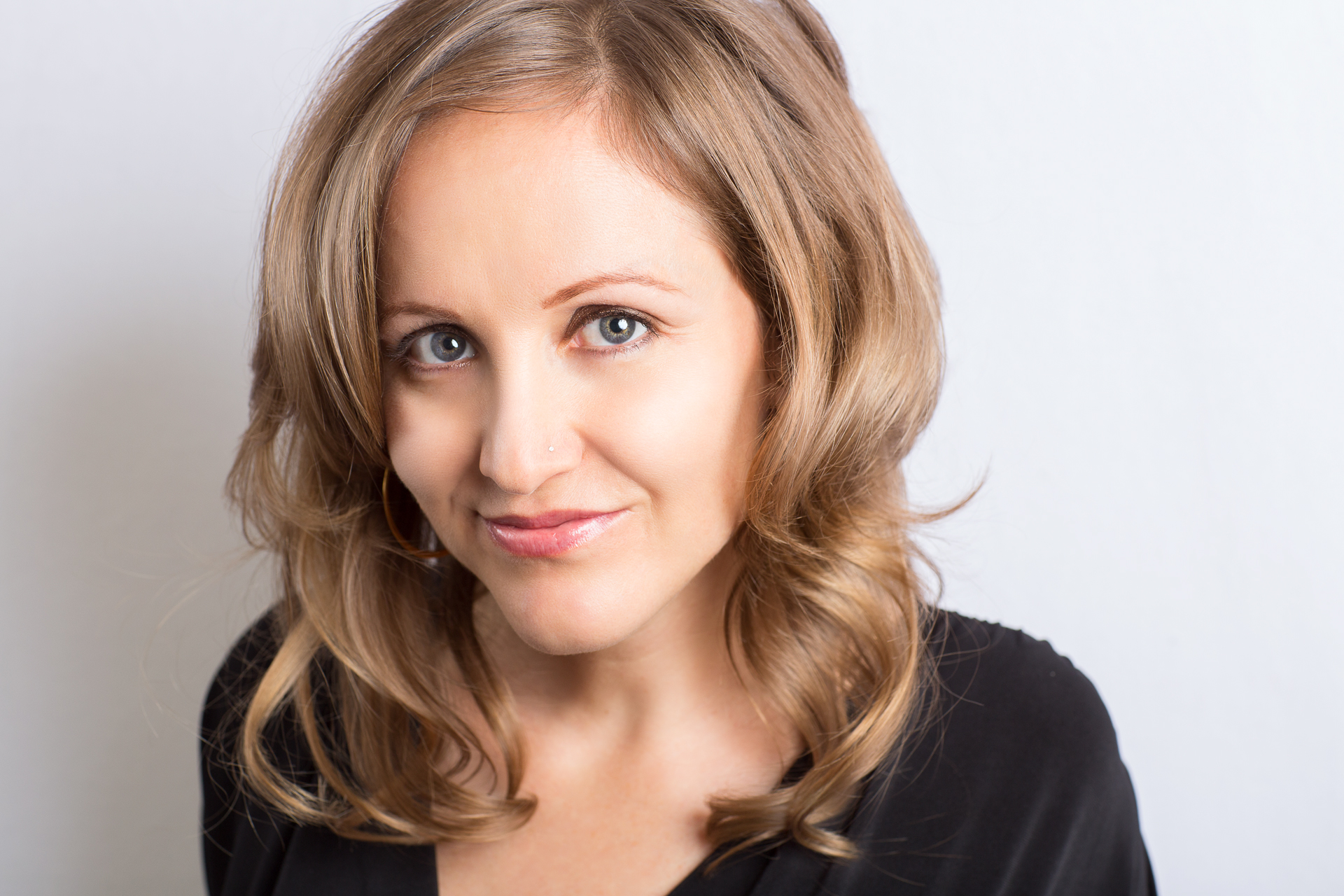
- Tibbals in 2014
- Born: Chauntelle Anne Tibbals; Paramount, California

Academic background
- Education: University of Texas, Austin
- Thesis: From reel to virtual: the U.S. adult film industry, production, and changes in women's labor opportunity (1957–2005) (2010)
- Doctoral advisor: Mounira M. Charrad

Academic work
- Main interests: Sociologist
- Website: www.chauntelletibbals.com

Chauntelle Tibbals is a sociologist from the United States. Her scholarly focus includes studies in gender, sexualities, work and organizations, media and new media, popular culture, and qualitative research methods.

== Early life ==
Tibbals was born in Paramount, California, a suburb of Los Angeles, and grew up in and around the LA area.

== Education ==
Tibbals completed her undergraduate studies at UCLA (2000), received her master's degree from CSUN (2003), and obtained her Ph.D. from UT-Austin in Sociology, with a portfolio in Women's & Gender Studies (2010).

She was a visiting scholar in University of Southern California’s Department of Sociology during 2012–13.

== Career ==
Tibbals' scholarly focus includes sociological studies in gender, sexualities, work and organizations, media and new media, popular culture, and qualitative research methods.

Her research over the past decade centers on the sociocultural significance of adult content and adult content production, including issues related to law, free speech, and workplace organizational structures. Tibbals writes and speaks frequently about issues related to higher education, law, gender identity and expression, and sexualities.

She was also a contributing writer to the Routledge journal Porn Studies.

Tibbals is a regular contributor for online media outlet Uproxx.

She is regularly asked to comment on sex, tech, and culture on mainstream media sites, including CNN, NBC News, NPR, ABC-Univision, Vice, Al Jazeera, Bloomberg TV, and the Huffington Post.

== Bibliography ==
Thesis

- Tibbals, Chauntelle Anne (2010). From reel to virtual: the U.S. adult film industry, production, and changes in women's labor opportunity (1957–2005) (Ph.D. thesis). University of Texas, Austin. OCLC 862120519.

Journal articles

- Tibbals, Chauntelle Anne (December 2007). "Doing gender as resistance: waitresses and servers in contemporary table service". Journal of Contemporary Ethnography. 36 (6): 731–751. doi:10.1177/0891241607303508. S2CID 145611547.
- Tibbals, Chauntelle Anne (October 2010). "From The Devil in Miss Jones to DMJ6 — power, inequality, and consistency in the content of US adult films". Sexualities. 13 (5): 625–644. doi:10.1177/1363460710376493. S2CID 145501923.
- Tibbals, Chauntelle Anne (January 2012). ""Anything that forces itself into my vagina is by definition raping me..." – Adult Performers and Occupational Safety and Health". Stanford Law & Policy Review. 23 (1). Stanford Law School: 231–251.
- Tibbals, Chauntelle Anne (2013). "When law moves quicker than culture: key jurisprudential regulations shaping the US adult content production industry". The Scholar. 15 (2). St. Mary's University School of Law: 213–259.
- Tibbals, Chauntelle Anne (January 2013). "Sex work, office work: women working behind the scenes in the US adult film industry". Gender, Work and Organization. 20 (1): 20–35. doi:10.1111/j.1468-0432.2010.00552.x.

Cited in: Weitzer, Ronald (May 2011). "Pornography's effects: the need for solid evidence: A review essay of "Everyday pornography", edited by Karen Boyle (New York: Routledge, 2010) and "Pornland: how porn has hijacked our sexuality", by Gail Dines (Boston: Beacon, 2010)". Violence Against Women. 17 (5): 666–675. doi:10.1177/1077801211407478. PMID 21511821. S2CID 220342944.

- Tibbals, Chauntelle Anne (January 2014). "Gonzo, trannys, and teens – current trends in US adult content production, distribution, and consumption". Porn Studies. 1 (1–2): 127–135. doi:10.1080/23268743.2013.863659.

Book chapters

- Tibbals, Chauntelle Anne (2014), "The in the future box: porn studies and changing definitions of deviance", in Kerry, Ferris; Stein, Jill (eds.), The real world: an introduction to sociology (4th ed.), New York: W.W. Norton & Company, Inc., p. 167, ISBN 9780393922585.

Books

- Tibbals, Chauntelle (2015-07-07). Exposure: A Sociologist Explores Sex, Society, and Adult Entertainment. Greenleaf Book Group Press. ISBN 9781626341937.

== Notes ==
- Spellman, Jim. (July 19, 2012) “Porn Stars Use Twitter to Go Mainstream”. CNN.com
- Hess, Amanda. (August 16, 2013) “Millions of Americans Watch Porn. But for Academics, Studying It Remains a Challenge”. Slate.com
- Mantle, Larry. (August 30, 2013) “Is Los Angeles Still a Porn Production Hub after Measure B Passed?”. SCPR.org
- Menendez, Alicia. (November 8, 2013) “Technology: Ya Can’t Have Sex With It and Ya Can’t Have Sex Without It”. Fusion.net
- Pappas, Stephanie. (March 21, 2014) “New Porn Studies Journal Launches”. LiveScience.com
- Barth, Rachel. (March 29, 2014) “Porn is Finally About to Be Taken Seriously”. Vice.com
- Sedor, Justin. (April 20, 2014) “Porn: Why We Make It, Why We Watch It”. Refinery29.com
- Hayoun, Massoud. (April 29, 2014) “Porn Stars Battle Stigma with Sex Awareness Amid Bank Account Closures”. AlJazeera America
- Michalopoulos, Deanna. (May 2014) “Why Is Objectification Bad?”. Bustle.com
- Dickson, E.J. (May 3, 2014) “Porn Stars are Mad at Samuel L Jackson for Jokingly Endorsing Piracy”. DailyDot.com
- Gwynn, Michele. (May 5, 2014) “Young Male Students and Predatory Female Teachers”. Examiner.com
- Innovation Crush. (May 2014) “Sex Cells”. SideShowNetwork
