= John Daly (footballer, born 1890) =

Australian rules footballer

Personal information
- Full name: John Dore Daly
- Born: 13 December 1890; San Remo, Victoria
- Died: 9 April 1968 (aged 77); Preston, Victoria
- Original team: Wonthaggi

Playing career^{1}
Years	Club	Games (Goals)
1914	Melbourne	8 (0)
- ^{1} Playing statistics correct to the end of 1914.

John Dore Daly (13 December 1890 – 9 April 1968) was an Australian rules footballer who played with Melbourne in the Victorian Football League (VFL).
