= Roberta I. Shaffer =

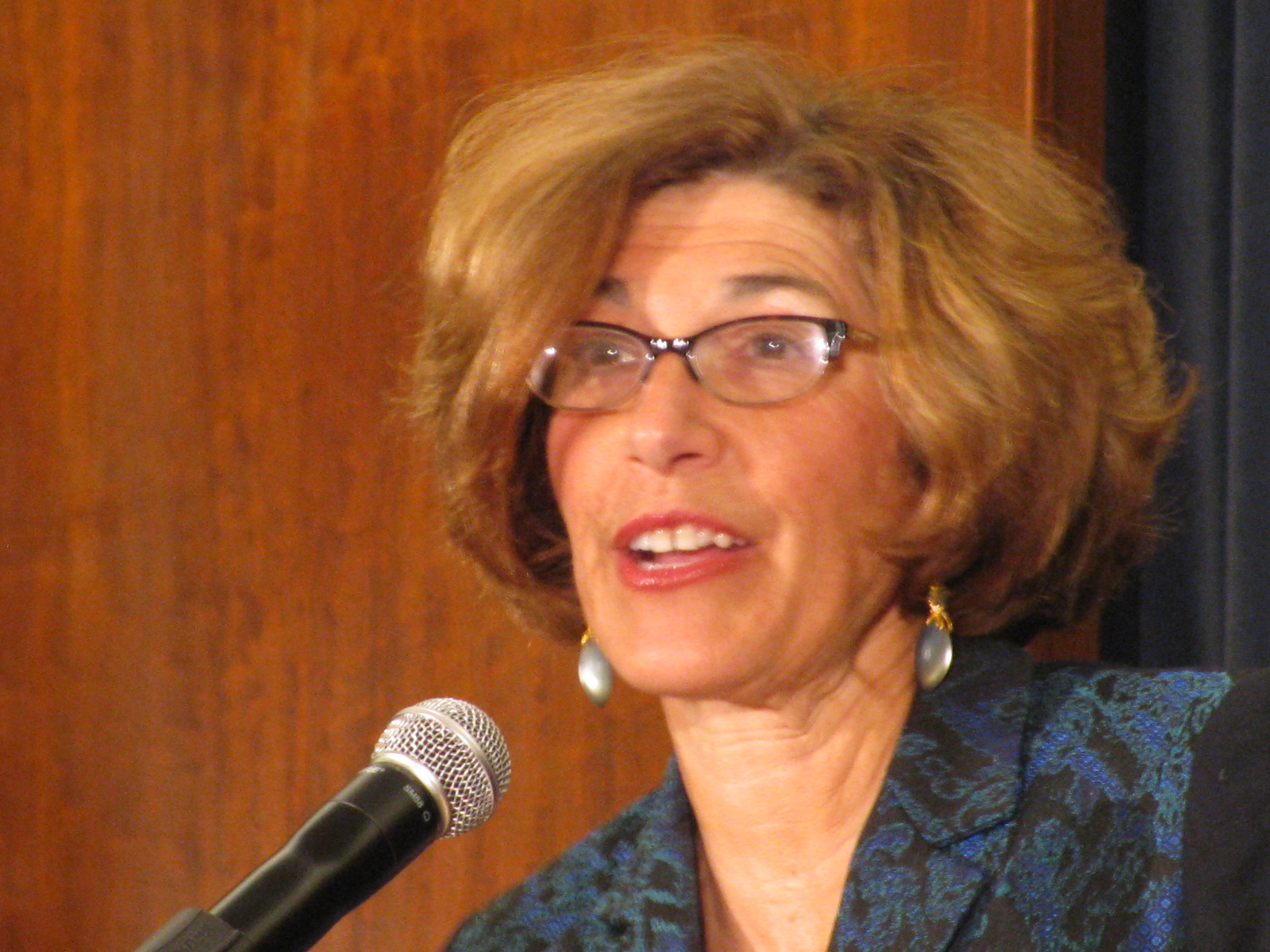
- Roberta I. Shaffer (2014)
- Born: November 27, 1953 (age 72); Oceanside, New York
- Occupation: Librarian
- Known for: Director of the Law Library of Congress

Roberta Ivy Shaffer (born November 27, 1953) is an American librarian and attorney and is the former Director of the Law Library of Congress.

Shaffer received a bachelor's degree from Vassar College in 1974 and a master's degree in library science from Emory University in 1975. She received her Juris Doctor from Tulane University in 1980.

Shaffer worked as the director of legal communications at the University of Houston Law Center from 1980 to 1984 and was a special assistant to the Law Library of Congress from 1984 to 1987. She was a Fulbright senior researcher in Tel Aviv, Israel in 1988. She served as the acting library director George Washington University Law Center in 1990. From 1991 to 1999, she was the director of library services for Covington & Burling law firm. She was the Dean of the Graduate School of Library and Information Science at the University of Texas at Austin from 1999 to 2001.

In 2005, Shaffer joined the Library of Congress as executive director of the Federal Library and Information Center Committee and the Federal Library and Information Network (FEDLINK). In 2009 she was named Law Librarian and in 2011 she became the associate librarian for Library Services. She retired from the Library of Congress in August 2014. She returned to the Library of Congress in 2015 as Acting Law Librarian and was made Law Librarian of Congress effective February 21, 2016.
