= Jack Daly =

Jack Daly may refer to:

- Jack Daly (politician) (1915–1988), Irish politician
- Jack Daly (hurler) (1889–?), Irish hurler
- Jack Daly (rugby union) (born 1998), Irish rugby union player
- John Daly (rugby) (1917–1988), Irish rugby union and rugby league player, known as Jack

== See also ==
- Jackie Daly (born 1945), Irish button accordion and concertina player
- Jackie Daly (hurler), Irish hurler
