= Shakespeare at Winedale =

Theatre criticism program affiliated with the University of Texas at Austin

Coordinates: 37.0625°N 95.677068°W

The Shakespeare at Winedale program, created in 1970 by James B. "Doc" Ayres, is a program affiliated with the University of Texas at Austin, dedicated to Shakespearean criticism through performance of the plays. The main performance space at Winedale, located in Round Top, Texas, is a barn donated to the University of Texas by Ima Hogg.

Each summer, a group of university students lives, studies, and performs at Winedale, presenting several Shakespeare plays in repertory inside the converted barn.

In addition to the college program, Shakespeare at Winedale now operates year-round initiatives such as Camp Shakespeare, a residential program introducing children and teens to Shakespeare’s works, and the Outreach Program, which partners with schools across Texas to promote arts education.

== Notable alumni ==
- Mike Godwin
- John Rando
- Terry Galloway
- James Loehlin
- Kirk Lynn
- Asha Rangappa
