= Oscar Mink =

Oscar Gorton Mink (1930–2004) was professor of curriculum studies in the Department of Curriculum and Instruction at the University of Texas at Austin, USA.

== Professional education ==
Mink held a doctorate in counseling psychology from Cornell University and degrees in mathematics and mining engineering from Brigham Young University and San Bernardino Valley College.

== Awards ==
- Most Learned Article Award from the U.S. Press Association, for research on learned helplessness
- Litterati Award from Litterati Foundation
- American Society for Training and Development award

== Publications ==
Mink published multiple books and over 300 articles.

Books:

- Statistical Concepts; A Basic Program by Jimmy Amos, Foster Lloyd Brown and Oscar G. Mink (1965)
- Developing and Managing Open Organizations: A Model and Methods for Maximizing Organizational Potential by Oscar G. Mink (Jun 1991)
- Groups at Work (Techniques in Training and Performance Development Series) by Oscar G. Mink (Aug 1987)
- Open Organizations: A Model for Effectiveness, Renewal, and Intelligent Change (Jossey-Bass Management by Oscar G. Mink, Barbara P. Mink, Elizabeth A. Downes and Keith Q. Owen (September 27, 1994)
- Developing High Performance People: The Art of Coaching by Oscar Mink, Barbara Mink, and Keith Owen (June 21, 1993)
- Statistical Concepts: A Basic Program (3rd Edition) by Foster Lloyd Brown, Jimmy R. Amos and Oscar G. Mink (January 1995)
- Change at Work: A Comprehensive Management Process for Transforming Organizations (Jossey-Bass Management) by Oscar G. Mink, Pieter W. Esterhuysen, Barbara P. Mink and Keith Q. Owen (November 19, 1993)
- America's problem youth: Education and guidance of the disadvantaged by Oscar G. Mink (1970)
- Holistic Literacy in College Teaching by John E. Roueche and Oscar G. Mink (1980)
- The Behavior Change Process by Oscar G. Mink (1970)
