= Michael B. Hall =

American chemist

Michael B. Hall is an American inorganic and theoretical chemist. He obtained his B.S. degree in chemistry from Juniata College in 1966, and his Ph.D. with Richard F. Fenske at the University of Wisconsin–Madison in 1971. Hall is currently a professor at Texas A&M University.

Hall was involved in the development of the Fenske-Hall method, an ab initio molecular orbital method, as well as the Couty-Hall modification to the LANL2DZ basis sets.
