= Donglei Fan =

Associate professor of Mechanical Engineering

Donglei Emma Fan
- Education: Johns Hopkins University, Nanjing University
- Awards: National Science Foundation CAREER Award, NSF Mid-Career Advancement Award
- Scientific career
- Fields: Nanomotors, nanorobotics, biosensing, water treatment, biomolecule release, assembly, nanomanufacturing, and nanoporous materials
- Workplaces: The University of Texas at Austin
- Doctoral advisor: Chia-Ling Chien and Robert C. Cammarata

External videos
- Texas Engineers Build World's Smallest, Fastest Nanomotor, Cockrell School of Engineering

Donglei "Emma" Fan is a professor of Mechanical Engineering of the Cockrell School of Engineering, an affiliated professor in Electrical and Computer Engineering, and a faculty member of the Materials Science and Engineering Program, and the Texas Materials Institute at The University of Texas at Austin. She works in its Nanomaterials Innovation Lab.

== Early life and education ==
Fan attended Nanjing University (NJU) as part of an honor program for gifted youth, the Department of Intensive Instruction, as an early admitted student, waived the National College Entrance Exam and awarded the Freshman Merit Scholarship.

She then attended Johns Hopkins University (JHU), from which she received two master's degrees, in materials science and engineering and in electrical engineering. She went on to receive her Doctor of Philosophy degree in materials science and engineering from JHU in 2007 and was a postdoctoral fellow at JHU from 2007 to 2009.

== Career ==
She is an inventor of the patented “3D Electrokinetic Tweezers” which is used to manipulate nanoscale materials. She is an inventor of nine granted patents, multiple licensed/optionally licensed to companies, and 8 pending patents and disclosures.

Fan became a Senior Member of the National Academy of Inventors (NAI) in 2025. She was elected as a director of the American Institute for Medical and Biological Engineering (AIMBE), and serves from 2025-2027.
