= Eugene C. Barker =

American historian (1874–1956)

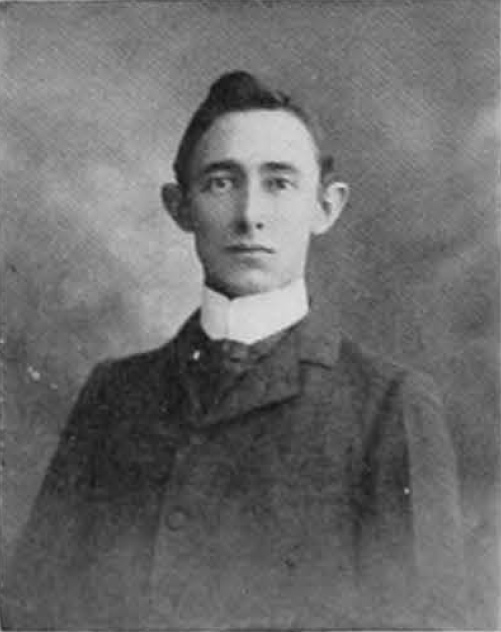
- Eugene C. Barker, circa 1899
- Born: November 1, 1874; Riverside, Walker County, Texas, US
- Died: October 22, 1956 (aged 81); Austin, Texas, US
- Spouse: Matilda LeGrand Weeden

Academic background
- Education: University of Texas (BA); University of Chicago; University of Pennsylvania (PhD)
- Thesis: "The Causes of the Texas Revolution" (PhD dissertation)
- Doctoral advisor: John Bach McMaster
- Influences: Frederick Jackson Turner, Lester Gladstone Bugbee, George Pierce Garrison

Academic work
- Discipline: History
- Sub-discipline: American history, Texas history
- Institutions: University of Texas; Radcliffe College; Texas State Historical Association; Southwestern Historical Quarterly; Mississippi Valley Historical Association
- Notable students: Carlos Castañeda; Llerena Friend; J. Evetts Haley; William Ransom Hogan; Harry Ransom; Walter Prescott Webb
- Main interests: American history, Texas history, Texas Revolution
- Notable works: The Life of Stephen F. Austin (1925)

Eugene Campbell Barker (November 1, 1874 – October 22, 1956) was an American historian at the University of Texas, the managing director of the Texas State Historical Association, and the editor of the Southwestern Historical Quarterly. He chaired the history department while soliciting gifts to the university, which he used to build a collection of archives and artifacts. In 1950, the university dedicated the Eugene C. Barker History Center as a repository for his collections. These collections are an important part of the Dolph Briscoe Center for American History at the University of Texas.

== Early life ==
Eugene Campbell Barker was born to Joseph and Fannie (Holland) Barker on November 1, 1874, in Walker County, Texas. Joseph operated a general store in Riverside, Texas, at the Houston and Great Northern Railroad station on the Trinity River. Barker's early education took place in a one-room school.

Barker was about 14 years old when his father died, and he started working at the Missouri Pacific shops after he moved with the family to Palestine, Texas. He attended a local night school while holding down a job as a blacksmith. He started matriculating at the University of Texas in 1895, though he continued his employment with the Missouri Pacific in Austin as a mail clerk. He earned his baccalaureate in 1899 and his master's degree the following year. His thesis was The Unification of Public Sentiment for the Texas Revolution.

== Career ==
=== Academics ===
In 1899, Barker began his career at the University of Texas as a history tutor before ascending the professional ladder as an instructor and then as an adjunct professor. He started a sabbatical in 1901 in order to continue graduate work, at the University of Chicago, the University of Pennsylvania (where he received his doctoral degree in 1908), and Harvard University. He taught at Radcliffe College concurrently with his post-doctoral studies at Harvard. He returned to the University of Texas as an associate professor and was promoted to full professor in 1913, a title he retained through 1951.

Barker's early influences as a young scholar were Lester Gladstone Bugbee and George Pierce Garrison, both University of Texas professors and early organizers of the Texas State Historical Association. In 1901, he published his first article, "The Difficulties of a Mexican Revenue Officer in Texas", which appeared in the January issue of the Quarterly of the Texas State Historical Society. That same year he successfully submitted multiple articles on the Texas Revolution to publications of the Southern Historical Association. He published two more articles in history journals in 1903.

Barker assumed the chair of the history department at the University of Texas in 1910. At that time, only two other history professors worked for the department. During the first few years of his chairmanship, he recruited six professors to the department, including Walter Prescott Webb. He took on other responsibilities in 1910. That year he was appointed as managing director of the Texas State Historical Association, while also assuming the role as editor of the organization's journal, the Quarterly of the Texas State Historical Association.

Barker also asserted himself as a fundraiser for building a historical archive for the university. He courted a wealthy Confederate Civil War veteran, Major George W. Littlefield, who joined the Board of Regents in 1911. Littlefield remained sympathetic to the Lost Cause narrative and Barker convinced him that funding for the acquisition of old documents would assist in balancing the narrative. Littlefield's contributions started with an initial $25,000 grant to establish the Littlefield Fund for Southern History, which was followed after his death by a $100,000 bequest.

Barker also assisted professors Bugbee and Garrison in the acquisition of important Texas history documents for the university's archival collection. These included the Bexar Archives, which document the Spanish and Mexican periods of Texas history; the papers of Stephen F. Austin; and the Texas Declaration of Independence. Another find for the archives came from J. Evetts Haley, who received a commission from Barker to travel throughout Texas in search of old documents and other artifacts. Haley's most important discovery was later known as the James Harper Starr Collection, which included the only known extant part from the diary of William B. Travis.

Barker's historical interests extended beyond Texas. He was president of the Mississippi Valley Historical Association in 1923. His editorship of the Southwestern Historical Quarterly lasted for 27 years, until 1937, the same year the University of Texas recognized him as a Distinguished Professor. In addition to scholarly works, such as his biography of Stephen F. Austin in 1926 and his co-editorship of Sam Houston's papers with Amelia W. Williams between 1938 and 1943, Barker also collaborated on several history textbooks.

=== Politics ===
Governor James "Pa" Ferguson attempted to pressure acting University of Texas president William J. Battle into firing six faculty members in 1915. Battle resisted this demand. Ferguson, however, continued to push for these dismissals the next year after Robert A. Vinson received his appointment as president. Frustrated a second time, Ferguson foreshadowed "the biggest bear fight that has ever taken place in the history of Texas".

Ferguson cut off all state appropriation to the university by a veto during the 1917 legislative session. Barker inserted himself in the feud by protesting Ferguson's nomination to replace the state librarian. Barker stood in resolute defense of the incumbent state librarian, Ernest W. Winkler. As the chair of the university's history department, he was an ex-officio member of the State Library and Historical Commission, a body responsible for vetting and appointing the state librarian. He reviewed Ferguson's nominee, A. F. Cunningham, but concluded in a letter that his lack of experience disqualified him from the position. Barker remitted a copy of the letter to Ferguson. The governor responded directly, making it known that he was insulted and that Barker had created an enemy. Barker became more involved in the broader politics of the university, meeting with alumni and administrators and taking the side of the university in its defense against Ferguson's attacks. Barker survived this dispute; Ferguson did not, as he was impeached and removed from office for reasons unrelated to his feud with the university.

== Personal life ==
Barker married Matilda LeGrand Weeden on August 6, 1903.

== Death and legacy ==
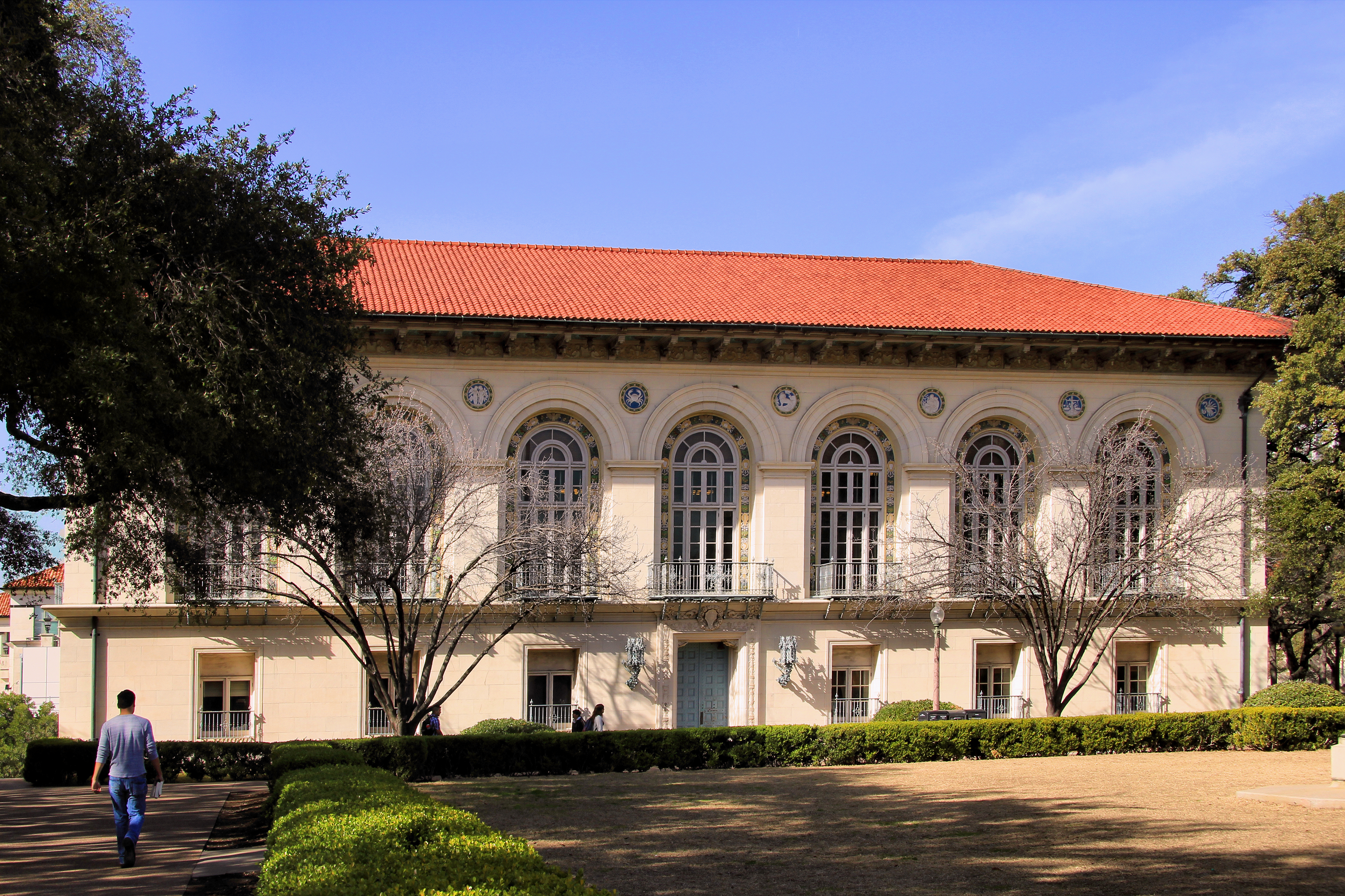
"Cass Gilbert's Old Library", more recently known as Battle Hall

Barker died on October 22, 1956. He was interred at Oakwood Cemetery in Austin.

Early during his tenure as managing director of the Texas State Historical Association, Barker changed the name of its academic journal to Southwestern Historical Quarterly, and as of 2024, the journal is still published under the same name.

Several notable historians studied under Barker, including Nettie Lee Benson, Carlos Castañeda, Harry Ransom, and Walter Prescott Webb.

In 1946, the university's Board of Regents resolved to house the Eugene C. Barker Texas History Center in the building known as "Cass Gilbert's Old Library". The building was so named because it had been designed by Cass Gilbert, who had been contracted as the university's architect in 1910. On April 27, 1950, about six years before Barker's death, the university celebrated the new location of the center with a dedication ceremony. However, the building has since been renamed Battle Hall and reallocated to the School of Architecture, a name and purpose it retained as of 2024.

Among the documents in the Barker collection representing early Texas history are the Bexar Archives, the Stephen F. Austin Papers, and the Texas Declaration of Independence. Barker was successful in soliciting $125,000 from George W. Littlefield to establish an archive of southern Civil War history, a collection which remains an important resource for modern historians. Ironically, these papers and letters from plantations, which were collected ostensibly to present the southern narrative in a better light, have instead revealed evidence to support critics of the southern plantation practices. The Eugene C. Barker Texas History Center is an important part of the Dolph Briscoe Center for American History, a repository at the University of Texas.

Barker published his biography of Stephen F. Austin in 1925. Despite the importance of Austin to Texas history, no other scholarly biographer completed a full-length biography of Austin until 1999. In Stephen F. Austin, Empresario of Texas, Greg Cantrell claims that Barker presented an image of Austin too much as the empresario wanted to present himself, though Cantrell admits that Barker's biography "was a model of scholarly research in its presentation of the facts of Austin's public career".

== Selected works ==
- Barker, Eugene C. (1917). Ferguson's War on the University of Texas: A Chronological Outline. Austin: Ex-Students Association of the University of Texas.
- Barker, Eugene C. (1925). The Life of Stephen F. Austin. Nashville: Cokesbury Press.
- Barker, Eugene C. (1928). Mexico and Texas, 1821–1835: University of Texas Research Letters on the Causes of the Texas Revolution. Dallas: P. L. Turner.
- Barker, Eugene C. (1924–1928). The Austin Papers. Washington, D. C.: U. S. Government Printing Office.
- Barker, Eugene C.; Williams, Amelia W. (1938–1943). The Writings of Sam Houston, 1813–1863. Austin: University of Texas University Press.
