= Zhimin Lu =

Chinese-American biologist and oncologist

- Occupations: Biologist, Oncologist
- Awards: Ruby E. Rutherford Distinguished Professorship, The University of Texas MD Anderson Cancer Center; The Dallas/Fort Worth Living Legend Faculty Achievement Award, The University of Texas MD Anderson Cancer Center; The Potu N. Rao Award for Excellence in Basic Science from the University of Texas MD Anderson Cancer Center; Peter Steck Memorial Young Investigator Award, Pediatric Brain Tumor Foundation

Academic background
- Education: M.D. Ph.D., Molecular, Cellular and Developmental Biology
- Alma mater: Taishan Medical College; Graduate Center of the City University of New York

Academic work
- Institutions: Institute of Translational Medicine, Zhejiang University

Zhimin (James) Lu (Chinese: 吕志民) is a Chinese-American biologist and oncologist. He is a professor, Kuancheng Wang Distinguished Chair, and Dean of Institute of Translational Medicine at Zhejiang University. Prior to joining Zhejiang University in 2019, he was the Ruby E. Rutherford Distinguished Professor and the director of Cancer Metabolism Program at the University of Texas MD Anderson Cancer Center.

Lu has authored over 130 publications. His research interests include cancer metabolism, tumorigenesis and tumor progression.

Lu is a fellow of American Association for the Advancement of Science and a foreign member of Academia Europaea. He received the Peter Steck Memorial Young Investigator Award in 2008, the Faculty Scholar Award from the University of Texas MD Anderson Cancer Center in 2011 and the Potu N. Rao Award for Excellence in Basic Science from the University of Texas MD Anderson Cancer Center in 2013 and Dallas/Fort Worth Living Legend Faculty Achievement Award in Basic Research from the University of Texas MD Anderson Cancer Center in 2016.

== Education ==
Lu studied at Taishan Medical College and received his MD degree in 1986. In 1992, he completed his training as Oncologist at Qingdao Hospital. He then moved to United States and enrolled at Graduate Center of the City University of New York, where he earned his Ph.D. degree in Molecular, Cellular and Developmental Biology in 1998. In the following year, he joined The Salk Institute for Biological Studies and completed his postdoctoral fellowship at Anthony R. Hunter's laboratory till 2003.

== Career ==
Following his postdoctoral research fellowship, Lu joined The University of Texas MD Anderson Cancer Center, where he held appointment as Assistant Professor at Department of Neuro-Oncology until 2009. He then served as Associate Professor at Department of Neuro-Oncology and Department of Molecular and Cellular Oncology until 2013. He was appointed as Professor at Department of Neuro-Oncology and Department of Molecular and Cellular Oncology from 2013 to 2018. He received Ruby E. Rutherford Distinguished Professorship in 2015. In 2019, he joined Zhejiang University, and is the Kuangcheng Wang Distinguished Chair and Dean of the Institute of Translational Medicine.

== Research ==
Lu's research focuses on cancer metabolism and made contributions to the cancer metabolism filed by discoveries of the protein kinase activity of multiple metabolic enzymes, clarification of instrumental mechanisms of the Warburg effect, and manifestation of the non-metabolic functions of metabolic enzymes and metabolites in context of tumorigenesis.

=== Metabolic enzymes function as protein kinases ===
Lu demonstrated that glycolytic enzyme pyruvate kinase M2 (PKM2) acts as a protein kinase and phosphorylates histone H3 to epigenetically regulate gene expression, the spindle assembly protein Bub3 to regulate chromosome segregation and mitotic checkpoint in metaphase, and myosin light chain (MLC) 2 to promote cytokinesis of cancer cells. He also showed that the glycolytic enzyme phosphoglycerate kinase 1 (PGK1) phosphorylates and activates pyruvate dehydrogenase kinase 1 (PDHK1) to repress pyruvate metabolism in mitochondria. Under energy stress conditions, PGK1 phosphorylates Beclin1 to regulate autophagy of cancer cells. In addition, he demonstrated that fructose kinase KHK-A is highly expressed in hepatocellular carcinoma cells by alternate splicing and acts as a protein kinase, phosphorylating and activating phosphoribosyl pyrophosphate synthetase 1 (PRPS1) to promote the de novo nucleic acid synthesis and live tumor formation and phosphorylating p62 to activate Nrf2-depdenent antioxidant responses. Furthermore, he discovered that gluconeogenic enzyme phosphoenolpyruvate carboxykinase 1 (PCK1) phosphorylates INSIG to activate SREBP and lipogenesis in cancer cells.

=== Instrumental mechanisms underlying the regulation of the Warburg effect ===
Lu demonstrated that growth factor receptor activation induces translocation of PKM2 into the nucleus, where it binds to and activates tyrosine-phosphorylated -catenin and c-Myc, resulting in expression of glycolytic genes and enhanced glucose uptake and lactate production. In addition, he showed that activation of growth factor receptors, expression of K-Ras G12V and B-Raf V600E, and hypoxia induce the mitochondrial translocation of PGK1, which phosphorylates and activates PDHK1 to inhibit mitochondrial pyruvate metabolism, thereby promoting the Warburg effect. Furthermore, he discovered that PTEN suppresses aerobic glycolysis by dephosphorylating and Inhibiting autophosphorylated PGK1, and deficiency of PTEN in cancer cells elicits the Warburg effect.

=== Nonmetabolic functions of metabolic enzymes and metabolites ===
In addition to the findings that metabolic enzymes of PKM2, PGK1, KHK-A, and PCK1 can function as protein kinases, he demonstrated that mitochondrial α-ketoglutarate dehydrogenase (α-KGDH) translocates into the nucleus and associates with KAT2A, which known as a histone acetyltransferase. KAT2A gains a new function and acts as a histone H3 succinyltransferase to regulate gene expression by locally catalyzing succinyl-CoA generated by α-KGDH. He also demonstrated that generation of acetyl-CoA at the gene promoter regions by nuclear acetyl-CoA synthetase 2 (ACSS2) induces gene expression for lysosomal biogenesis and autophagy

== Awards and honors ==
- 1999 - The Pioneer Fund Fellowship, The Salk Institute
- 2000 - California Breast Cancer Research Program Postdoctoral Fellowship, California Breast Cancer Research Program
- 2007 - Brain Tumor Society Program Award, Brain Tumor Society
- 2008 - Peter Steck Memorial Young Investigator Award, Pediatric Brain Tumor Foundation
- 2009 - American Cancer Society Research Scholar, American Cancer Society
- 2011 - The Faculty Scholar Award, The University of Texas MD Anderson Cancer Center
- 2012 - The James S. McDonnell Foundation Scholar Award, The James S. McDonnell Foundation
- 2013 - The Potu N. Rao Award for Excellence in Basic Science, The University of Texas MD Anderson Cancer Center
- 2015 - The Ruby E. Rutherford Distinguished Professorship, The University of Texas MD Anderson Cancer Center
- 2015 - The University of Texas Faculty STARs Award
- 2016 - The Dallas/Fort Worth Living Legend Faculty Achievement Award in Basic Research, The University of Texas MD Anderson Cancer Center
- 2017 - Fellow, American Association for the Advancement of Science
- 2019 - Kuancheng Wang Distinguished Chair, Zhejiang University
- 2021-Foreign member of Academia Europaea (The Academy of Europe).
