= Amelia Worthington Williams =

American historian

Amelia Worthington Williams (March 26, 1876 – April 14, 1958) was an American historian who researched the Alamo and Sam Houston.

== Biography ==
She was born in Maysfield, Texas, on March 26, 1876, to Thomas Herbert and Emma Massengale Williams. She was a collateral descendant of the Marquis de Lafayette. Some of her ancestors had been planters in South Carolina in the antebellum era; later, her father, a veteran of the Confederacy, started a plantation in Milam County.

Williams was the oldest of seven children. She was recognized for her scholastic abilities. She attended Stuart Seminary in Austin. She graduated with a liberal arts degree from Ward Seminary in Nashville, Tennessee, in 1895. She managed the family plantation and helped raise her four younger sisters after the deaths of her parents. She worked as a history and English teacher and worked on her Bachelor of Arts degree at Southwest Texas State Normal School, which she earned in 1922, followed by Bachelor of Arts and Master of Arts degrees from the University of Texas in 1926. She was a student of Eugene C. Barker. She earned her Ph.D. in 1931 when she was 55 years old.

Williams was an instructor at the University of Texas from 1925 to 1951. She researched and wrote about the Alamo, of which she was considered a foremost authority, and Sam Houston. Her dissertation was the first scholarly study of the survivors of the Alamo. Portions of the dissertation were published in Southwestern Historical Quarterly in 1933 and 1934.

She collaborated with Barker on The Writings of Sam Houston; she is credited with convincing Houston's descendants to provide access to documents.

Williams was a Presbyterian and a Democrat.

Williams died in Austin on April 14, 1958. She had been working on a biography of Sam Houston. She was buried near her hometown of Maysfield, Texas in the Little River Cemetery.

== Memberships ==
- Daughters of the Republic of Texas (Honorary lifetime member)
- Daughters of the American Revolution
- United Daughters of the Confederacy
- Order of the Eastern Star

== Selected works ==
- "The Siege and Fall of the Alamo," thesis, 1931.
- "A Critical Study of the Siege of the Alamo and of the Personnel of its Defenders," Ph.D. dissertation, 1931.
- Following General Sam Houston, 1793–1836. The Steck Company, 1935.
- The Writings of Sam Houston, 1813–1863. With Eugene C. Barker. 1837–1843.

== Papers ==
Williams' papers are held at the University of Texas at Austin.
