= James Loehlin =

American literary historian and writer

James Norris Loehlin
- Born: November 4, 1964; Austin, Texas, U.S.
- Died: September 14, 2023 (aged 58); Austin, Texas, U.S.

James N. Loehlin, (November 4, 1964 – September 14, 2023) was an American literary historian, professor, stage director, actor, and writer from Austin, Texas who served as the Shakespeare at Winedale Regents Professor of English and director of the Shakespeare at Winedale program at University of Texas at Austin. He was a Marshall Scholar at Oxford, and earned joint Ph.D. in Drama and Humanities at Stanford. He taught in the Drama Department at Dartmouth College. He was the son of the Psychology Professor and Behavior Geneticist John Loehlin.

== Awards ==
- Harry Ransom Teaching Award
- Chad Oliver Teaching Award in Plan II
- President's Associates Teaching Award
- Pro Bene Meritis Award (posthumous)

== Works ==
- The Cambridge Introduction to Chekhov (Cambridge Introductions to Literature)
- Henry IV: Parts 1 and 2 (The Shakespeare Handbooks)
- Chekhov: The Cherry Orchard (Plays in Production)
