= Robert van de Geijn =

American computer scientist

Robert A. van de Geijn is a professor of Computer Sciences at the University of Texas at Austin. He received his B.S. in Mathematics and Computer Science (1981) from the University of Wisconsin–Madison and his Ph.D. in Applied Mathematics (1987) from the University of Maryland, College Park. His areas of interest include numerical analysis and parallel processing.

== Major work ==
Van de Geijn's has turned toward the theoretical, in particular with his development of the Formal Linear Algebra Method (FLAME). FLAME is an original effort at formalizing the efficient derivation of linear algebra algorithms that are provably correct. This approach benefits from his less theoretical experience; it is designed to ultimately lead to the efficient design and implementation of these algorithms.

He is the principal author of the widely cited book. Using PLAPACK—parallel linear algebra package. Scientific and engineering computation. Cambridge, Mass: MIT Press, 1997.

== Personal ==
Robert van de Geijn was born on August 14, 1962, in the Netherlands. He later moved to the United States, where he enrolled at the University of Wisconsin-Madison in 1978. He is married to a fellow academic, Margaret Myers. They have three children, and now live in a historic house in downtown Pflugerville, Texas.
