= Richard F. Fenske =

American chemist

Richard Ferdinand “Dick” Fenske (May 23, 1929, in Milwaukee – December 14, 2011) was a chemist who taught at the University of Wisconsin–Madison for thirty years. He was chair of the chemistry department from 1972 until 1977 and retired from teaching in 1999.

With Michael B. Hall, he developed the Fenske-Hall method, an ab initio molecular orbital method.

== Biography ==
Fenske was one of ten children born to Bernard and Mary Fenske. He earned a B.S. in chemistry from Marquette University in 1952 and a Ph.D. in chemistry from Iowa State University in 1961.

== Publications ==
A list of his publications is available at Academic Tree.
