= Louis Tuffly Ellis =

American historian (1927–2022)

- Born: January 3, 1927; Houston, Texas, U.S.
- Died: January 3, 2022 (aged 95); Houston, Texas, U.S.
- Parents: Thomas Fordtran Ellis; Louise Cornelia Tuffly Ellis

Academic background
- Education: University of Texas; University of Houston
- Thesis: "The Texas Cotton Press Industry: A History" (1964)
- Influences: Joe B. Frantz

Academic work
- Discipline: History
- Sub-discipline: American history, Texas history
- Institutions: Del Mar College; Lamar University; University of Texas; Texas State Historical Association

Louis Tuffly Ellis (January 3, 1927 – January 3, 2022) was an American historian specializing in Texas history.

== Early life and family history ==
Ellis was born in Houston on January 3, 1927. His parents were Thomas Fordtran Ellis and Louise Cornelia Tuffly Ellis.

While Ellis lived in Houston for most of his youth, he graduated from Kirwin High School in Galveston, Texas.

== Death and legacy ==
Ellis died in Houston on January 3, 2022, his 95th birthday.
