= George Pierce Garrison =

American historian

- Born: December 19, 1853; Carrollton, Georgia, US
- Died: July 3, 1910 (aged 56); Austin, Texas, US
- Spouse: Annie Perkins

Academic background
- Education: Sewanee College, Carroll Masonic Institute, University of Edinburgh, University of Chicago

Academic work
- Discipline: History
- Institutions: University of Texas at Austin
- Notable students: Eugene C. Barker, Ernest Winkler

George Pierce Garrison (December 19, 1853 – July 3, 1910) was an American historian. He taught at local schools in Texas before joining the faculty at the University of Texas at Austin, where he attained the positions of Professor and Chair of the History Department.

== Early life ==
George Pierce Garrison was born in Carrollton, Georgia, on December 19, 1853. His parents were Patterson Gillespie and Mary Ann (Curtiss) Garrison. George was the seventh of twelve children. Around the age of fifteen, he attended Sewanee College, but returned his hometown to study at the Carroll Masonic Institute in 1870 and 1871.

== Career ==
In 1874, Garrison taught school in Rusk, Texas, and he taught in various East Texas schools for about five years. He returned to studies in 1879. He attended the University of Edinburgh for two years, where earned certificates for arts and for merits in several subjects.

Garrison recommenced teaching in 1881 at Coronal Institute in San Marcos, Texas. After withdrawing to a ranch to recover from tuberculosis, he accepted a position at the University of Texas as an instructor in history and English literature. Four years later, in 1888, the University of Texas spun off its English Literature and History Department into separate English Literature and History departments. The university promoted him to Assistant Professor and Chair of the History Department. He ascended the academic ranks, culminating in an appointment as Professor in 1897, while retaining his position as chair throughout his tenure.

Garrison completed a graduate education while teaching and administrating at the University of Texas. The University of Chicago granted him a doctorate in 1896.

Garrison was an organizer of the Texas State Historical Association. In July 1897, Garrison founded the Quarterly of the Texas State Historical Association, which was at the time just one of three journals published by a state historical society. He edited the first seven volumes of the journal, and co-edited it with Herbert E. Bolton and Eugene C. Barker starting in 1904.

Garrison helped to acquire many archival records on behalf of the University of Texas. With Lester Gladstone Bugbee, he acquired the Bexar Archives on behalf of the school. He also was instrumental in bringing the Moses Austin papers and Stephen F. Austin papers to the university. Guy Morrison Bryan, a descendent of the Austins, worked with Garrison to convey these documents to the University of Texas.

== Personal life ==
In 1881, Garrison married Annie Perkins of Henderson, Texas.

== Death and legacy ==
Garrison died on July 3, 1910, in Austin, Texas. He is buried at Oakwood Cemetery in Austin.
