= Michael Hall (English musician) =

English musician, conductor, and radio presenter

- Born: 26 March 1932
- Occupations: Violist; conductor; broadcaster; musciologist; writer

Michael Hall (26 March 1932 - 22 August 2012) was a violist, conductor, lecturer, broadcaster, musicologist, and writer.

Michael, born Richard Michael Hall in Whitley Bay, went to Dame Allan's school, Newcastle upon Tyne, and in 1948, as a violist, was one of the founder members of the National Youth Orchestra. He won a scholarship to the Royal College of Music in London, and after national service in the RAF, where he had his first experience of conducting as a bandmaster, he went to Durham University and took a degree in music (1958).

In 1958 he founded the Northern Sinfonia, now Royal Northern Sinfonia, in Newcastle upon Tyne. This was the first permanent professional chamber orchestra in Britain outside London. With Hall as conductor, the orchestra toured the region giving regular concerts, and in Newcastle, established a Connoisseur's Series, concentrating on 20th-century and new music.

After leaving the orchestra and a spell of freelance conducting, he joined the Gramophone Department of the BBC's Third Programme as a producer in 1965. During his time as a producer, he encouraged upcoming contemporary composers whose work he featured in a series called Music in our Time. He also worked alongside Roy Plomley as a producer on Desert Island Discs.

Leaving the BBC in 1974, Michael became a lecturer at Sussex University teaching both undergraduates and the wider public through the Continuing Education scheme, which ran extra mural day, evening and weekend courses. He also returned to conducting during the early days of New Sussex Opera, with productions of Peter Grimes and Boris Godunov. He published his first full-length book on the composer Sir Harrison Birtwistle in 1984 with a follow-up in 1988. He was commissioned by Faber and Faber to write the book accompanying Channel 4's contemporary music series Leaving Home, presented by Sir Simon Rattle.

Taking early retirement from teaching, he returned to the BBC as a freelance broadcaster with Radio 3. He presented magazine programmes such as Third Ear, as well as discussing music coming up in The Proms and giving introductory talks on the work of a range of composers in the Listening To ... series. From 1992 to 2006 he lived in rural southwest France, where he concentrated on writing. He returned to the UK in 2006 and died in Exeter in 2012.

In September 2018, the 60th anniversary of the (Royal) Northern Sinfonia, his widow unveiled a plaque to his memory in Sage, Gateshead, the permanent home of the orchestra he founded.

== Books ==
- Harrison Birtwistle (Robson Book, 1984) ISBN 1861052359
- Harrison Birtwistle in Recent Years (Robson Books, 1988) ISBN 1861051794
- Leaving Home (Faber and Faber, 1988) ISBN 0571178774
- Schubert's Song Sets (Routledge, 2003) ISBN 0754607984
- Between Two Worlds: The Music of David Lumsdaine (Arc Publications, 2003) ISBN 1900072858
- Music Theatre in Britain, 1960-1975 (Boydell Press, 2015) ISBN 1783270128
