= Carlos Castañeda (historian) =

American historian and librarian

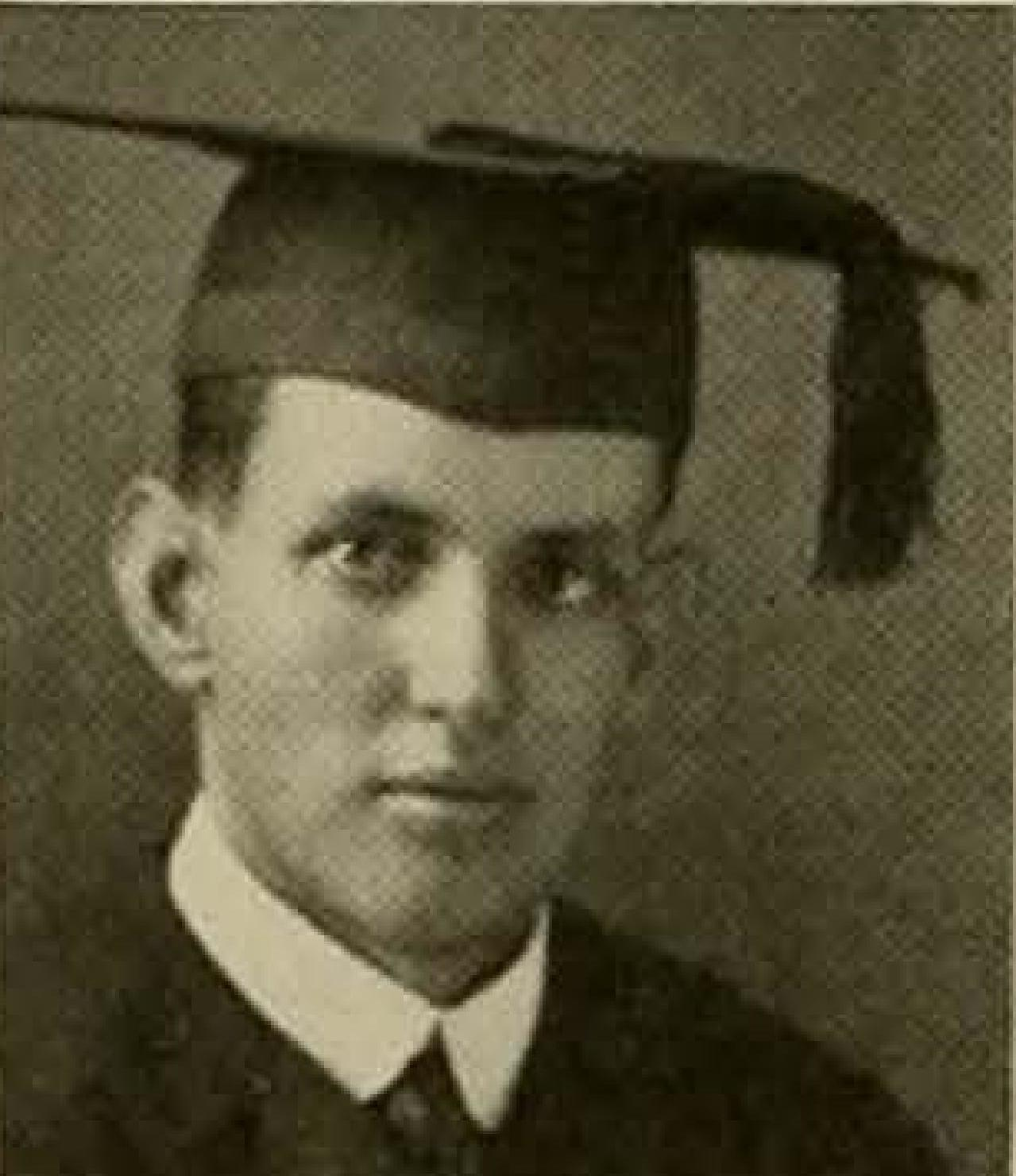
- Born: November 11, 1896; Ciudad Camargo (Tamaulipas)
- Died: April 3, 1958
- Education: University of Texas at Austin
- Occupations: Historian, librarian
- Employer: University of Texas at Austin

Carlos Eduardo Castañeda (November 11, 1896 – April 3, 1958) was a historian, specializing in the history of Texas, and a leader in the push for civil rights for Mexican-Americans.

Born in Mexico, Castañeda immigrated to the United States with his family in 1908. He gained an undergraduate and master's degree in history from the University of Texas at Austin, and then spent several years teaching Spanish at the College of William and Mary. While there, he helped establish the college's Catholic ministry and what became Saint Bede Catholic Church. Castañeda returned to Texas in 1927, serving as the first curator of the Latin American collection at the University of Texas. While he worked as a librarian, Castañeda pursued his doctorate in history, which he finally earned in 1932.

Castañeda's work as a historian focused on the Spanish borderlands, especially Texas. He combed various archives in Mexico to find and copy previously unknown documentation on life in Texas and the southwestern United States. For his work in documenting Catholic history in Texas, Castañeda was named a Knight of the Holy Sepulchre and a Knight Commander in the Order of Isabella the Catholic of Spain.

During World War II, Castañeda took a leave of absence from his teaching position at the University of Texas to work as an investigator for the Fair Employment Practices Committee. He advocated for equal rights for Mexican-Americans, and was promoted to regional director of the FEPC southwest region in 1946.

The Perry–Castañeda Library at the University of Texas is named for him.

== Early years ==
Carlos Eduardo Castañeda was born November 11, 1896, in Camargo, Mexico, one of seven siblings born to a professor who worked at the College of San Juan in Matamoros. The family moved to Brownsville, Texas in 1908, and his parents died shortly thereafter. The only Mexican-American student in his graduation class, Castañeda distinguished himself as valedictorian of the Brownsville High School class of 1916. He earned a scholarship to the University of Texas at Austin, where he initially studied civil engineering. After working for prominent historian Eugene Campbell Barker, Castañeda discovered a love of history and changed his major. He received his BA in history in 1921. In late December of that year, Castañeda married his childhood friend Elisa Rios. Their daughter, Irma Gloria, was born the following year.

For the next two years, Castañeda pursued his master's degree in history while also working as a high school Spanish teacher. For his master's thesis, Castañeda compiled a detailed index of the Spanish and Mexican documents located in Bexar County, where San Antonio is located. His work was well received; historian Herbert Eugene Bolton acknowledged that Castañeda had discovered some important documents. He received his master's degree in history from the University of Texas in 1923.

== Historian ==
From 1923 through 1926, Castañeda was an associate professor at the College of William and Mary, where he taught Spanish. In December 1923, he helped found the Gibbons Club, a student organization agitating for a Catholic priest from Newport News to be allocated for Sunday Masses, as there were no priests or parishes in Williamsburg. Eventually, the club's activities led to the founding of Saint Bede parish, creating a chapel that is now the National Shrine of Our Lady of Walsingham. Although Castañeda enjoyed teaching, he missed his home state and wanted to return to a focus on Texas history. He began looking for opportunities to return.

In Texas, preparations were already under way for the 1936 Texas Centennial, which would mark the hundredth anniversary of independence from Mexico. The Texas delegation of the Knights of Columbus decided to fund a scholarly history of the Catholic Church in Texas, to be published for the centennial. The head of the Knights of Columbus in Texas, Joseph I. Driscoll, invited Castañeda to suggest ways of approaching the vast project. In his response, Castañeda suggested that the committee sponsoring the work appoint a single individual to gather the appropriate primary sources for the eventual publication. He volunteered his time to help, noting that he was planning to teach in Mexico City that summer, and remarking that "I am a graduate of the University of Texas, and though a Mexican by birth, I feel that I am a Texan in spirit." Driscoll quickly authorized Castañeda to gather information.

Castañeda received an offer for a temporary position at the University Junior College of San Antonio but rejected it to pursue more permanent employment. He was soon appointed curator of the newly established Latin American Collection at his alma mater, beginning the job in 1927. He negotiated a workday of only seven hours a day, giving him time to work on his own projects and pursue a doctorate degree. After his translation of Juan Almonte's Statistical Report on Texas, 1834 was published in the Southwestern Historical Quarterly in 1927, he was named a fellow of the Texas State Historical Association. Over the course of the year, he translated and edited several books, and also began work towards his doctorate in history.

In 1929, Castañeda discovered a wealth of documents relating to the history of Texas during Spanish and Mexican rule in the archives of the Mexican states of Coahuila and Nuevo León. Earlier historians, including Barker and Bolton, had either overlooked the records or failed to copy the information for use by historians in Texas. Castañeda intended to photocopy the information from the archives in Saltillo, the capitol of the defunct Mexican state of Coahuila y Tejas, noting that it "is of the move vital nature for the history of Texas". Shortly after his return to the United States, Castañeda's six-year-old daughter Gloria died of encephalitis.

Castañeda received a scholarship from the Farmer Foundation for his final year of graduate classes, 1929–1930, easing some of his financial worries. While he worked to complete his coursework, Castañeda translated the pamphlet Latin America and the United States into Spanish for the Knight of Columbus to distribute. After passing his examinations, Castañeda reapplied for the scholarship so that he could work on his dissertation. He remained busy throughout 1930, editing a volume of documents from Mexican archives, La guerra de reforma: segun el archivo del General D. Manuel Doblado, 1857–1860.

In April 1930, Castañeda joined the Sociedad de Geografia y Estadistica in Mexico City. While there, he discovered that the National Library of Mexico now housed the archives from the Franciscan order in New Spain. A quick perusal revealed over 500,000 pages of new documents, many discussing Texas.

Castañeda received his doctorate from the University of Texas in 1932; his dissertation was a translation of a book written by Fray Juan Agustín Morfi in 1779, the Relación geográfica e histórica de la provincia de Texas o Nuevas Filipinas. Morfi's work had been considered lost until Castañeda discovered a copy in the Franciscan archives. The same year, Castañeda's second child, Consuela, was born.

Bitter that his salary was lower than his non-Mexican counterparts, Castañeda left the University of Texas in 1933, accepting a job as superintendent of schools in Del Rio, Texas. That job lasted only a year, after white parents expressed displeasure with a Mexican-born superintendent. He returned to the University of Texas in 1936 as an associate professor and was promoted to full professor in 1946. By 1942, he had finished five volumes of Our Catholic Heritage, covering the years of 1519 through 1810. The final two volumes, covering the time from 1810 through 1950, were published in 1948 and 1958.

== Activist ==
Too old to volunteer for military service during World War II, Castañeda instead solicited an appointment with the Fair Employment Practices Committee (FEPC). From 1943 through 1946 he served in the Dallas office, investigating discrimination against Hispanics and Blacks. In February 1945, he was promoted to regional director, covering the states of Texas, New Mexico, and Arizona. During his tenure, Castañeda took on the oil refineries in the Houston metropolitan area. Mexican-American workers had complained that they were paid less than their white counterparts, had no access to promotions, and were forced to use the facilities marked for colored people. In a scathing response to Shell Oil, Castañeda pointed out that Mexicans were legally classified as white, and that the state laws, "regrettable as the fact is", insisted on separate accommodations for white and black. By making Mexicans use the colored areas, the company was in violation of the law. Shell and the union both admitted that the policies violated the law, but maintained they would be at a competitive disadvantage if they chose to comply; every time the company attempted to promote Mexican-American workers, white workers went on strike.

Castañeda returned to the University of Texas in 1946.

He died on April 3, 1958. His personal papers are held at the University of Texas.

== Recognition and honors ==
Castañeda served as president of the American Catholic Historical Association in 1939. He was also highly involved in the First and Second Congress of Historians of Mexico and the United States. The Perry–Castañeda Library at the University of Texas is named for him.

For his work on Catholic history, Castañeda was named a Knight of the Holy Sepulchre by the Catholic Church and a Knight Commander in the Order of Isabella the Catholic of Spain. He was granted an honorary LLD degree by the Catholic University of America, and was given the Serra Award of the Americas in 1951.

On his death, historian J. Lloyd Mecham declared Castañeda was "one of our most distinguished and productive scholars and teachers in the field of Latin American history". The Bibliography of Religion in the South notes that Castañeda's history of Roman Catholicism in Texas is "the most comprehensive and the most historiographically sound analysis of that tradition in any state".

== Analysis of writings ==
Scholar Mario T. Garcia described Castañeda's historical works as "an optimistic and positivist view of history". His books assumed that the spread of European culture and the Catholic religion were positive advances for North America. According to Garcia, Castañeda's "moralistic interpretation of history" was influenced by the World War II battles between fascism and democracy. Garcia points out that Castañeda ignored the negative impact of the Spanish history in North Americas, especially in the Spanish treatment of Indians.

Unlike many historians of the era, Castañeda focused on the similarities between the Spanish-Mexican and Anglo-American traditions in North America. This was an attitude common among Mexican-American leaders of the time. A disciple of Herbert Eugene Bolton, Castañeda believed that American history comprised much more than just the history of the Anglos, that it could only be understood in context with the Spanish and Mexican roots of the southwest. In the context of Texas history, Castañeda was highly critical of the traditional approach of American historians, who ignored all events in Texas before the arrival of the Anglos. In addition, he sought to revise the approach taken to the Texas Revolution. American historians focused on Anglo accomplishments in the war and stressed the Anglo victory over Mexicans, an attitude that Castañeda said "was largely responsible for the superiority complex that underlies the attitude towards the Mexican in Texas today". Castañeda urged historians to focus on the impact that Tejanos, Mexican-born citizens of Texas, had on the revolution. In speeches, he compared the Texan army of the revolution, composed of Anglos, Mexicans, and others, to the Allied Forces of World War II, each group composed of multiple ethnicities fighting for freedom.

Castañeda wrote several essays discussing discrimination against Mexican-Americans. He discussed the unofficial classification of Mexicans as "non-white" but not "colored", which was generally used for purposes of racial discrimination. His essays stressed that Mexicans had been in Texas and the rest of the Southwestern United States for much longer than the Anglos, and that because of that history they could be considered more American than those considered fully white. He attacked the economic discrimination, in which Mexicans were paid less than whites for the same work. As a solution, Castañeda advocated increased educational opportunities for Mexican-Americans and the continuation of the Fair Employment Practices Commission.

== Bibliography ==
=== Author ===
- "Los manuscritos perdidos de Gutierrez de Luna", Revista mexicana de estudios historicos (1928)
- "The Corregidor in Spanish Colonial Administration", The Hispanic American Historical Review (1929)
- "Silent Years in Texas History", Southwestern Historical Quarterly (1934)
- Our Catholic Heritage in Texas, 7 volumes (1936–1958)
- A Report on the Spanish Archives in San Antonio, Texas (1937)
- Guide to the Latin American Manuscripts in the University of Texas Library (1939), with Jack Autrey Dabbs
- "The Beginning of Printing in America", The Hispanic American Historical Review (1939)
- "The Human Side of a Great Collection." Books Abroad, vol. 14, no. 2 (Spring 1940) pp. 116–121.
- "Communications between Santa Fe and San Antonio in the Eighteenth Century", Texas Geographic Magazine (1941)
- "A Chapter in Frontier History", Southwest Review (1942)
- A History of Latin America for Schools (1944), with Samuel Guy Inman
- "The Sons of Saint Francis in Texas", The Americas (1945)
- The Lands of Middle America (1947) with E. C. Delaney
- "Fray Juan de Zumárraga and Indian Policy in New Spain", The Americas (1949)
- "Relations of General Scott with Santa Anna", The Hispanic American Historical Review (1949)
- Calendar of the Manuel E. Gondra Manuscript Collection of the University of Texas (1952), with Jack Autrey Dabbs
- "Why I Chose History", The Americas (1952)
- "Social Developments and Movements in Latin America", in Church and Society: Catholic Social and Political Thought and Movements, 1789–1950 (1953)
- "Spanish Medieval Institutions in Overseas Administration: The Prevalence of Medieval Concepts", The Americas (1954)
- Independent Mexico in Documents: Independence, Empire, and Republic. A Calendar of the Juan E. Hernández Davalos Collection of the University of Texas (1954)
- "The Augustinians Wend Their Way Westward", Augustiniana (1956)

=== Translator and editor ===
- "Statistical Report on Texas by Juan N. Almonte, 1835", Southwestern Historical Quarterly (1925)
- "A Trip to Texas in 1828: Jose Maria Sanchez", Southwestern Historical Quarterly (1926)
- The Mexican Side of the Texan Revolution (1928)
- "Historia de todos los colegios de la ciudad de Mexico desde la conquista hasta 1780 por el dr. Feliz de Osores y Sotomaya", in Nuevo documentos ineditos o muy raros para la historia de Mexico, Volume II (1929)
- "La Guerra de Reforma segun el Archivo del General Manuel Doblado, 1857–1860", in Nuevo documentos ineditos o muy raros para la historia de Mexico, Volume III (1930)
- The History of Texas, 1673–1779, by Fray Juan Agustin Morfi, Missionary, Teacher, Historian (1935)

== Sources ==
- Almaraz, Felix D. (2013). "Carlos Castañeda". In Cox, Patrick L.; Hendrickson, Kenneth E. Jr. (eds.). Writing the Story of Texas. University of Texas Press. ISBN 978-0-292-74875-0.
- "Carlos E. Castañeda Papers, 1497–1958". University of Texas libraries.
- Foley, Neil (2010). Quest for Equality: The Failed Promise of Black-brown Solidarity. Harvard University Press. ISBN 978-0-674-05023-5.
- Garcia, Mario T. (1991). Mexican Americans: Leadership, Ideology, and Identity, 1930-1960. Yale University Press. ISBN 0-300-04984-6.
- Lippy, Charles H. (1985). Bibliography of Religion in the South. Mercer University Press. ISBN 0-86554-161-2.
- Mecham, J. Lloyd (August 1958). "Obituary Notes: Carlos Eduardo Castañeda, 1896-1958". The Hispanic American Historical Review. 38 (3): 383–388. doi:10.1215/00182168-38.3.383.
