= Michael G. Hall =

American educator, and historian (born 1926)

Michael Garibaldi Hall
- Born: January 8, 1926 (age 100); Princeton, New Jersey, U.S.
- Occupations: Educator, historian and academic

Academic background
- Education: B.A. Ph.D.
- Alma mater: Princeton University; Johns Hopkins University
- Thesis: Edward Randolph and the American Colonies, 1676–1703

Academic work
- Institutions: University of Texas

Michael Garibaldi Hall (born January 8, 1926) is an American educator, historian and academic. He is associated with University of Texas' Department of History as professor emeritus.

Hall's principal research focused on early American history, mainly the seventeenth century. He has also worked on Puritan New England and world history.

Hall is a member of American Antiquarian Society.

== Early life and education ==
Hall is the son of Walter Phelps Hall, who taught European History at Princeton University. He completed his Bachelors studies from Princeton University in 1949 and his Doctoral studies from Johns Hopkins University in 1956.

== Career ==
Following his doctoral studies, Hall served as fellow of Institute of Early American History and Culture, for a period of three years before moving from Virginia to Texas. In 1959, he was recruited by University of Texas as an assistant professor at Department of History. He was promoted to associate professor in 1964, and to professor, in 1970. In 2001, he was appointed as professor emeritus of history at the university. Hall served as chairman of the Department of History at University of Texas from 1976 till 1980.

== Research and work ==
Hall initially researched on Puritan New England and later worked on World History as a whole. He has also conducted extensive research on early American History, focusing primarily on the seventeenth century.

=== Edward Randolph and the American Colonies, 1676–1703 ===
Hall published his book, Edward Randolph and the American Colonies, 1676–1703 in 1960 and documented an overview of Edward Randolph's career as a royal official at the American colonies. Douglas Edward Leach from Vanderbilt University stated that Hall provided a "realistic and convincing" picture of the book's subject. According to Frederick B. Tolles, Hall followed Randolph's American career with "remarkable objectivity and fidelity to the widely scattered sources" and that he has found "little in it to criticize." He also stated that "Hall writes in a style that is enviable for its economy and clarity." Richard S. Dunn reviewed that "Hall's narrative is extremely well done" and that "Hall has written a fine book", which is "one of the best monographs on the middle period in American colonial history". Clara G. Roe, in a review, stated that "the general reader as well as the student of colonial history will find this an interesting book".

=== The Last American Puritan: The Life of Increase Mather, 1639–1723 ===
A biography of Increase Mather (1639–1722) capped Hall's scholarly work and gives an understanding of second generation American Puritanism. Hall shows how Mather sponsored a printing press in Boston, and then by printing scores of books of topical sermons, started Boston on the road to multiple printing presses and booksellers; the Puritan minister fully engaged in an increasingly cosmopolitan Boston. In 1688–1692 he personally lobbied two successive kings of England on behalf of the colony. During those four years in London he absorbed much of Europe's new Rationalism, and on his return to Boston he brought the hysteria of witchcraft at Salem to an abrupt halt. The biography traces the evolution of Puritanism toward the Eighteenth Century. His book was reviewed as "A thorough and authoritative biography of one of New England's more important Puritan figures" and "A well-researched and fair-dealing work that approaches its subject closely without losing sight of the larger historical picture." Ronald S. Bosco from State University of New York reviewed that "Hall achieves the rare, humane relation between biographer and the subject." He stated that "Hall has produced a moving and informative life in which the reader is invited to know, sympathize with, and respect Increase in ways formerly denied both reader and subject" by "writing out of the uncanny insight that comes from extended intimacy with one's subject". According to Edward Stessel, "Hall's study of the many-sided Mather is a model of scholarship." W. Clark Gilpin stated that "Hall has contributed significantly to American Puritan studies by this comprehensive, chronological exposition of Increase Mather's life and writings."

Hall also edited the Autobiography of Increase Mather.

== Awards and honors ==
- 1988 – Book of the Year Award for The Last American Puritan, Conference on Christianity and Literature

== Bibliography ==
- The Glorious Revolution in America: Documents on the Colonial Crisis of 1689 (1963)
- Edward Randolph and the American Colonies, 1676–1703 (1960)
- The Last American Puritan: The Life of Increase Mather, 1639–1723 (1988)
- Hall, M.G., 1961, October. The Autobiography of Increase Mather. In Proceedings of the American Antiquarian Society (Vol. 71, pp. 260–289).
