= Volker Bromm =

American astronomer

- Education: University of Heideberg; Yale University
- Occupation: Astronomer

Volker Bromm is an American astronomer. He is the Jane and Roland Blumberg Centennial Professor in the department of astronomy at the University of Texas at Austin.
