= John A. Daly =

American academic

John A. Daly is an American professor of Communication at The University of Texas at Austin. He is the Liddell Professor of Communication in the Moody College of Communication, Regents Distinguished Teaching Professor, and Texas Commerce Bancshares Professor in the McCombs School of Business.

Daly teaches graduate and undergraduate courses on topics such as Interpersonal Communication, Organizational Behavior, Crisis Management, and Advocacy. He also instructs professional programs on advocacy, change management, working in dispersed environments, leadership and teamwork skills, crisis management, and communication for the executive education at the McCombs School of Business.

Daly has produced 225 scholarly articles, books, and book chapters on communication.

Daly has been recognized as a Distinguished Scholar by the National Communication Association and a Fellow of the International Communication Association. He served as President of the National Communication Association, chair of the Council of Communication Societies and on the Board of Directors of the International Communication Association and the International Customer Service Association.

Daly received his Ph.D. from Purdue University, M.A. from West Virginia University, and undergraduate degree from the University of Maryland.

== Selected publications ==
=== Recent books ===
- Advocacy: Championing Ideas and Influencing Others. Yale University Press. 2012. ISBN 978-0300188134.
- The Norton Field Guide to Speaking. W. W. Norton & Company. 2022. ISBN 978-0-393-44224-3.
- The SAGE Handbook of Interpersonal Communication (4th ed.). SAGE Publications, Inc. 2011. ISBN 978-1412974745.

=== Recent articles ===
- Daly, J.A.; Glowacki, E.M. (2017). "Empowering questions affect how people construe their behavior: Why how you ask matters in self-attributions for physical exercise and healthy eating". Journal of Language and Social Psychology. 36 (5): 568–584. doi:10.1177/0261927X16668219. S2CID 152049460.
- Daly, J.A.; Redlick, M.H. (2016). "Handling questions and objections affects audience judgments of speakers". Communication Education. 65 (2): 164–181. doi:10.1080/03634523.2015.1081958. S2CID 146782903.
- Daly, J.A.; Saetre, A.S. (2023). "The consequences of face-threatening feedback on innovators' psychological safety, affect, and willingness to engage in future innovation projects". Frontiers in Psychology. 14: 1280. doi:10.3389/fpsyg.2017.01280. PMC 5539242. PMID 28824480.
- Daly, J.A.; Thompson, C.M. (2017). "Persuasive self-efficacy: Dispositional and situational correlates". Communication Research Reports. 34 (3): 249–258. doi:10.1080/08824096.2017.1297224. S2CID 151755068.
