= Bexar Archives =

Archival collection in Texas

The Bexar Archives is a collection of documents archived at the University of Texas.

== Provenance ==
The Bexar Archives contain a collection of Spanish language documents which are named for their city of origin, San Antonio de Bexar. These documents accumulated in San Antonio, which was established as a government center in Texas during Spanish and Mexican rule. The Bexar County Commissioners' Court voted on September 30, 1899 to transfer nearly 81,000 documents totaling over 204 pages to the University of Texas. The university agreed to translate, archive, and store all the documents in a fireproof vault. Carlos Castañeda performed the initial archival work.
