= Luis Zayas (professor) =

Luis H. Zayas is a psychiatry professor at University of Texas at Austin. He is dean of Austin School of Social Work, president of the St. Louis Group for Excellence in Social Work Research and Education, a fellow of the American Academy of Social Work and Social Welfare, and a member of the executive committee of the National Association of Deans and Directors of schools and programs in social work. He Advocates for U.S. citizen-children.

== Education ==
- Ph.D., Columbia University
- M.A., M.Phil., Columbia University
- M.S. (social work), Columbia University

== Awards ==
- 1993 Economic and Cultural Diversity Award for his work with AIDS orphans and their families.
- 2007, Distinguished Faculty Award at Washington University in St. Louis.

== Academic interests ==
- Adapting interventions for diverse ethnocultural families
- Suicide attempts among young Latinos
- Child and adolescent mental health
- Family functioning
- Advocacy for U.S. citizen-children.

== Research ==
- Undocumented, Unaccompanied, and Citizen: Charting Research Directions for Children of Immigration (2016)
- Exploring the Effects of Parental Deportation on U.S. Citizen Children (2014)
- Integrated Behavioral Health MSSW Scholars Program for Underserved Populations (2016)
- IAUPR Puerto Rico (2014)
