= List of Guggenheim Fellowships awarded in 1988 =

Two hundred and sixty-two scholars, artists, and scientists received Guggenheim Fellowships in 1988. $6,343,000 was disbursed between the recipients, who were chosen from an applicant pool of 3,265 and represented 95 different institutions. University of California, Berkeley had the most fellowship recipients on its faculty (14), followed by its sister school University of California, Los Angeles (10).

== 1988 U.S. and Canadian Fellows ==
Category	Field of Study	Fellow	Institutional association	Research topic	Notes	Ref
Creative Arts	Choreography	Martha Clarke		Travels in Europe	Also won in 1975	
Creative Arts	Choreography	Bebe Miller	Bebe Miller and Company	Choreography		
Creative Arts	Choreography	Stephen J. Petronio	Stephen Petronio Company	Choreography		
Creative Arts	Choreography	Yvonne Rainer	Whitney Museum of American Art	Choreography	Also won in 1969	
Creative Arts	Choreography	Wendy Rogers	UC Berkeley and Rogers Dance Company	Arroyo Seco, new choreography, solo research, and editing the film Stand By		
Creative Arts	Choreography	Sally Silvers		Choreography		
Creative Arts	Choreography	Kei Takei	Moving Earth	Choreography	Also won in 1978	
Creative Arts	Drama & Performance Art	Lee Blessing		Playwriting		
Creative Arts	Drama & Performance Art	Elizabeth Diggs	New York University	Playwriting		
Creative Arts	Drama & Performance Art	Janusz Glowacki		Playwriting		
Creative Arts	Drama & Performance Art	Harry Kondoleon		Playwriting		
Creative Arts	Fiction	T. C. Boyle	University of Southern California	Writing		
Creative Arts	Fiction	James Lee Burke	Wichita State University	Black Cherry Blues (published 1989)		
Creative Arts	Fiction	Jay Cantor	Tufts University	Novel about his hometown on Long Island		
Creative Arts	Fiction	Bruce Duffy		Writing		
Creative Arts	Fiction	Larry C. Heinemann		Cooler by the Lake (published 1992)		
Creative Arts	Fiction	Phillip Lopate	University of Houston	Writing		
Creative Arts	Fiction	Gloria Naylor	Brandeis University	Writing		
Creative Arts	Fiction	Jayne Anne Phillips	Boston University	Writing		
Creative Arts	Fiction	Joanna Scott	University of Rochester	Arrogance (published 1990)		
Creative Arts	Fiction	Mona Simpson	Princeton University	Writing		
Creative Arts	Fiction	Lawrence Thornton	UC Santa Barbara (visiting)	Writing		
Creative Arts	Film	Steve Brand	ABC News	Development of a film adaption of Frederic Morton's A Nervous Splendor		
Creative Arts	Film	Peter Entell		Filmmaking		
Creative Arts	Film	Ken Kobland	School of the Art Institute of Chicago (visiting)	Filmmaking		
Creative Arts	Film	Andrew Noren		Filmmaking		
Creative Arts	Fine Arts	Michael Brewster	Claremont Graduate School	Artwork that "allow[s] the viewer to control the presence of the sculptural sound field by actually turning the pieces on"		
Creative Arts	Fine Arts	Glenn Goldberg	New York Studio School	Visual art		
Creative Arts	Fine Arts	Betty Goodwin		Visual art		
Creative Arts	Fine Arts	Sidney T. Guberman		Art and architecture of Spain		
Creative Arts	Fine Arts	Carol Haerer	Fordham University, Lincoln Center, and Queensborough Community College	Painting		
Creative Arts	Fine Arts	Susanna Heller		Painting		
Creative Arts	Fine Arts	Edward Henderson		Painting		
Creative Arts	Fine Arts	Gabriel Laderman	Queens College	Painting		
Creative Arts	Fine Arts	Donald Lipski		Sculpture		
Creative Arts	Fine Arts	Sharon Patten		Painting		
Creative Arts	Fine Arts	David Reed		Painting		
Creative Arts	Fine Arts	Juan Sanchez		Painting		
Creative Arts	Fine Arts	Joseph William Santore		Painting		
Creative Arts	Fine Arts	Gary P. Stephan		Painting		
Creative Arts	Fine Arts	Alan Turner		Painting		
Creative Arts	Music Composition	T. J. Anderson	Tufts University	Composing: Chamber opera		
Creative Arts	Music Composition	Ross Bauer	Stanford University	Composing		
Creative Arts	Music Composition	Michael Gandolfi		Composing		
Creative Arts	Music Composition	Timothy Geller		Composing		
Creative Arts	Music Composition	Scott A. Lindroth		Composing		
Creative Arts	Music Composition	Eric H. Moe	San Francisco State University	Composing		
Creative Arts	Music Composition	Melinda Jane Wagner	Syracuse University	Composing		
Creative Arts	Music Composition	Scott Wheeler		Composing		
Creative Arts	Photography	Jack Carnell	Germantown Academy and University of the Arts	Sports events such as the Kentucky Derby and Rose Bowl, as well as political events such as political conventions		
Creative Arts	Photography	Roy Colmer				
Creative Arts	Photography	William Klein				
Creative Arts	Photography	Reagan Louie	San Francisco Art Institute			
Creative Arts	Photography	Dana A. Salvo				
Creative Arts	Photography	Laura Volkerding	Stanford University	France's metal, wood, and stone workshops of the Compagnons du Devoir		
Creative Arts	Poetry	Michael Blumenthal	Harvard University	Readings around the country to increase his audience		
Creative Arts	Poetry	Deborah Digges	Tufts University	Writing		
Creative Arts	Poetry	Brendan James Galvin	Central Connecticut State University	Writing		
Creative Arts	Poetry	James Galvin	University of Iowa	Writing		
Creative Arts	Poetry	Emily Grosholz	Pennsylvania State University	Writing		
Creative Arts	Poetry	Rachel Hadas	Rutgers University	Writing		
Creative Arts	Poetry	Daniel Halpern	Columbia University	Writing		
Creative Arts	Poetry	Thomas Lux	Sarah Lawrence College	Writing		
Creative Arts	Poetry	Jane R. Miller	University of Arizona	Writing		
Creative Arts	Poetry	Robert Morgan	Cornell University	Writing		
Creative Arts	Poetry	Alberto Alvaro Ríos	Arizona State University	Writing		
Creative Arts	Poetry	Jordan F. Smith	Union College	Writing		
Humanities	African Studies	Sara Sweezy Berry	Boston University			
Humanities	American Literature	Christopher Benfey	Mount Holyoke College and New York University	Critical biography of Stephen Crane		
Humanities	American Literature	Myra Jehlen	Rutgers University	European origins of American writing		
Humanities	American Literature	Diane Wood Middlebrook	Stanford University	Critical biography of Anne Sexton		
Humanities	American Literature	Keith W. F. Stavely	Watertown Free Public Library	American Protestantism in the First and Second Great Awakenings		
Humanities	Architecture, Planning, & Design	Leland S. Burns	UCLA			
Humanities	Architecture, Planning, & Design	Isabelle Hyman	New York University			
Humanities	Architecture, Planning, & Design	Stephen Murray	Columbia University			
Humanities	Architecture, Planning, & Design	Jon Pynoos	University of Southern California	Social/political history of public policy and elderly housing		
Humanities	Architecture, Planning, & Design	Christine Smith	Georgetown University	Architecture and humanist culture in the early Renaissance		
Humanities	Bibliography	Randall McLeod	University of Toronto	Comparison of more than 50 copies of John Harington's 1591 English translation of Ariosto's Orlando Furioso		
Humanities	Bibliography	Mark Lindsey Van Stone		Manuscripts and inscriptions around the world		
Humanities	Biography	Bernice G. Kert		Abby Aldrich Rockefeller		
Humanities	Biography	Margot Peters	University of Wisconsin-Whitewater	Critical biography of the "royal family" of American theater: Ethel, John, and Lionel Barrymore		
Humanities	British History	Cynthia Brilliant Herrup	Duke University			
Humanities	British History	Joseph M. Levine	Syracuse University	History and significance of the quarrel between the "ancients and the moderns"		
Humanities	Classics	Charles W. Fornara	Brown University	Ammianus Marcellinus and his historical work		
Humanities	Classics	Alexander Mourelatos	University of Texas at Austin	Discovery of form in early Greek philosophy		
Humanities	Classics	John J. Winkler	Stanford University	Papyrus fragments of ancient Greek novels		
Humanities	East Asian Studies	Norma Field	University of Chicago	Modernity and anti-modernity in three Meiji writers		
Humanities	Economic History	Stefano Fenoaltea	Institute for Advanced Study			
Humanities	Economic History	Naomi R. Lamoreaux	Brown University			
Humanities	English Literature	Joel B. Altman	UC Berkeley	Shakespeare's Othello and Renaissance rhetorical culture		
Humanities	English Literature	Jerome C. Christensen	Johns Hopkins University	Strong Romanticism: Lord Byron's Gift		
Humanities	English Literature	Catherine Gallagher	UC Berkeley	British women writers and the literary marketplace		
Humanities	English Literature	Ernest B. Gilman	New York University	Francis Junius and the arts of the Stuart court		
Humanities	English Literature	Mary Longstaff Jacobus	Cornell University	Literature, psychoanalysis, and the feminine body		
Humanities	English Literature	William Keach	Brown University			
Humanities	English Literature	Ronald L. Levao	Queens College			
Humanities	English Literature	Patricia Anne Parker	Stanford University	Shakespeare and the rhetorical tradition		
Humanities	English Literature	Don E. Wayne	UC San Diego	Ben Jonson and modern aesthetics		
Humanities	English Literature	Howard D. Weinbrot	University of Wisconsin-Madison	Rise of British literature from Dryden to Ossian		
Humanities	English Literature	Richard Wendorf	Northwestern University			
Humanities	English Literature	James P. White	University of South Alabama			
Humanities	Fine Arts Research	Suzanne Preston Blier	Columbia University	Dahomean aesthetic expression and social experience		
Humanities	Fine Arts Research	William A. Camfield	Rice University	Dada movement in Paris during the 1920s		
Humanities	Fine Arts Research	Jaroslav T. Folda	University of North Carolina	Art of the Crusades, 1099-1291		
Humanities	Fine Arts Research	Linda Dalrymple Henderson	University of Texas at Austin	Art and mysticism in French and American art of the early 20th century		
Humanities	Fine Arts Research	Fred S. Kleiner	Boston University			
Humanities	Fine Arts Research	Lucy Freeman Sandler	New York University	Omne Bonum		
Humanities	Fine Arts Research	Anne M. Wagner	Massachusetts Institute of Technology and UC Berkeley	History of French sculpture, 1789-1917		
Humanities	French History	Jonathan French Beecher	UC Santa Cruz	Victor Considerant and French romantic socialism		
Humanities	French History	Philip Benedict	Brown University	Calvinism and society in Europe		
Humanities	French History	Richard F. Kuisel	SUNY at Stony Brook			
Humanities	French Literature	Antoine Compagnon	Columbia University	Proust between decadence and modernity		
Humanities	French Literature	Martha N. Evans	Mary Baldwin College			
Humanities	French Literature	Pierre Saint-Amand	Brown University			
Humanities	Folklore & Popular Culture	Robert B. Cochran II	University of Arkansas	Ozark folk song		
Humanities	Folklore & Popular Culture	William H. Wiggins Jr	Indiana University	Racial stereotypes depicted in Jack Johnson and Joe Louis newspaper cartoons, 1908-1938		
Humanities	Folklore & Popular Culture	Jack Zipes	University of Florida	Social history of the literary fairytale of the West		
Humanities	General Nonfiction	Gretel Ehrlich		Essays on the relationship of the human to the landscape		
Humanities	General Nonfiction	Thomas L. Friedman	The New York Times	Guide to Middle East politics		
Humanities	General Nonfiction	Patricia Hampl	University of Minnesota	A Memoir of a Catholic Childhood		
Humanities	General Nonfiction	Wendy Celia Lesser	The Threepenny Review	The feminine as portrayed in men's art		
Humanities	General Nonfiction	Jonathan Evan Maslow	University of South Alabama	An account of travel along the Gulf Coast and the Caribbean Rim		
Humanities	General Nonfiction	Jonathan Schell		The unconquerable world		
Humanities	German & East European History	Thomas A. Brady Jr.	University of Oregon	Peoples of the Holy Roman Empire, 1400-1700		
Humanities	German & East European History	Rudy John Koshar	University of Southern California	Preservation of historic places in 20th-century Germany		
Humanities	German & East European History	David Warren Sabean	UCLA	Kinship and rural structure in Germany, 1700-1870		
Humanities	German & Scandinavian Literature	Jens Rieckmann	University of Washington	Critical biography of Hugo von Hofmannsthal		
Humanities	German & Scandinavian Literature	Alexander Stephan	University of Florida	Exiled writers in the files of the German Foreign Office, 1933-1945		
Humanities	History of Science & Technology	Ruth Schwartz Cowan	SUNY Stony Brook			
Humanities	History of Science & Technology	John E. Lesch	UC Berkeley	History of sulfa drugs		
Humanities	Iberian & Latin American History	E. Bradford Burns	UCLA	The forging of a nation-state in Nicaragua, 1838-1909		
Humanities	Iberian & Latin American History	Karen Spalding				
Humanities	Intellectual & Cultural History	Margaret C. Jacob	Hofstra University			
Humanities	Intellectual & Cultural History	Edward M. Peters	University of Pennsylvania	Limits of intellectual inquiry		
Humanities	Intellectual & Cultural History	Anson G. Rabinbach	Cooper Union	Energy, fatigue, and work in modern Europe, 1860-1940		
Humanities	Latin American Literature	Gregory Rabassa	Queens College and CUNY Graduate School			
Humanities	Linguistics	Stephen R. Anderson	UCLA			
Humanities	Linguistics	C.-T. James Huang	Cornell University			
Humanities	Linguistics	Sandra A. Thompson	UC Santa Barbara	Similarities among languages of the world		
Humanities	Literary Criticism	Marianne DeKoven	Rutgers University			
Humanities	Literary Criticism	Geoffrey Galt Harpham	Tulane University			
Humanities	Literary Criticism	Jeffrey M. Perl	Columbia University			
Humanities	Literary Criticism	Tobin Siebers	University of Michigan	Literary ethics		
Humanities	Literary Criticism	James E. Young	New York University	Holocaust memorials in Europe, Israel, and America		
Humanities	Medieval History	Barbara A. Hanawalt	University of Minnesota			
Humanities	Medieval Literature	C. David Benson	University of Connecticut			
Humanities	Medieval Literature	Carol Clover	UC Berkeley	Woman in the Viking age		
Humanities	Medieval Literature	A. S. G. Edwards	University of Victoria	Research at University of Washington		
Humanities	Medieval Literature	Sylvia Jean Huot	Northern Illinois University	Reception of the Romance of the Rose in the 14th century		
Humanities	Music Research	Bonnie J. Blackburn		Language of the music in the 15th century		
Humanities	Music Research	Laurence Dreyfus	Yale University	Bach as interpreter of the concerto and fugue		
Humanities	Music Research	Harold S. Powers	Princeton University	Verdian musical dramaturgy		
Humanities	Near Eastern Studies	Walter Emil Kaegi	University of Chicago	Byzantine-Muslim warfare, 650-850		
Humanities	Near Eastern Studies	Raymond P. Scheindlin	Jewish Theological Seminary of America	Medieval Hebrew religious poetry and Arabic humanism		
Humanities	Philosophy	Marilyn McCord Adams	UCLA	Philosophical theology of Anselm of Canterbury		
Humanities	Philosophy	Annette C. Baier	University of Pittsburgh	Appropriate trust as a central concept in ethics		
Humanities	Philosophy	Alan Code	UC Berkeley	Philosophical commentary on Book VII of Aristotle's Metaphysics		
Humanities	Philosophy	Philip S. Kitcher	UC San Diego	Progress and rationality in science		
Humanities	Photography Studies	Jane S. Livingston	Corcoran Gallery of Art	The New York School: Photography 1936-1963		
Humanities	Religion	Elizabeth A. Clark	Duke University			
Humanities	Religion	George A. Lindbeck	Yale University			
Humanities	Religion	Ed Parish Sanders	University of Oxford			
Humanities	Renaissance History	Anthony Grafton	Princeton University	Second volume of his dissertation		
Humanities	Russian History	Stephen F. Cohen	Princeton University	The struggle to reform the Soviet system, from Khrushchev to Gorbachev	Also won in 1976	
Humanities	Russian History	Roberta T. Manning	Boston College	Politics and society of the Soviet countryside, 1935-1941		
Humanities	Science Writing	David Quammen		The Song of the Dodo (published 1996)		
Humanities	Slavic Literature	Frantisek W. Galan	Georgia Institute of Technology			
Humanities	Slavic Literature	Richard F. Gustafson	Barnard College			
Humanities	South Asian Studies	Lee A. Siegel	University of Hawaii	Magic and conjuring in Indian traditions		
Humanities	Theatre Arts	Eileen Blumenthal	Rutgers University	Cambodia		
Humanities	United States History	Sucheng Chan	UC Santa Cruz			
Humanities	United States History	Joseph J. Ellis	Mount Holyoke College	The birth of liberal America, 1780-1840		
Humanities	United States History	Alice Kessler-Harris	Hofstra University			
Humanities	United States History	Suzanne Lebsock	Rutgers University			
Humanities	United States History	Pauline Maier	Massachusetts Institute of Technology			
Humanities	United States History	Marcus Rediker	Georgetown University			
Humanities	United States History	Harry N. Scheiber	UC Berkeley	Technology and the development of American law	Also won in 1970	
Humanities	United States History	Joel H. Silbey	Cornell University			
Humanities	United States History	Harry S. Stout	Yale University			
Natural Sciences	Applied Mathematics	Richard Durrett	Cornell University			
Natural Sciences	Applied Mathematics	Eric D. Siggia	Cornell University			
Natural Sciences	Astronomy & Astrophysics	Roger Blandford	California Institute of Technology			
Natural Sciences	Astronomy & Astrophysics	James Burkett Hartle	UC Santa Barbara	Origin of the universe		
Natural Sciences	Astronomy & Astrophysics	R. Bruce Partridge	Haverford College	The cosmic microwave background		
Natural Sciences	Chemistry	Dimitri Coucouvanis	University of Michigan			
Natural Sciences	Chemistry	Thomas P. Fehlner	University of Notre Dame	Thin film deposition		
Natural Sciences	Chemistry	William M. Jackson	UC Davis	The use of energy lasers in probing the details of fleeting chemical reactions		
Natural Sciences	Chemistry	William D. Jones	University of Rochester	Photochemical behavior of organometallic complexes		
Natural Sciences	Chemistry	Jack R. Norton	Colorado State University			
Natural Sciences	Chemistry	George A. Olah	University of Southern California		Also won in 1972	
Natural Sciences	Chemistry	Alexander Pines	UC Berkeley	Surfaces by optical and magnetic resonance		
Natural Sciences	Chemistry	Thomas G. Spiro	Princeton University			
Natural Sciences	Chemistry	Jeanne Mager Stellman	Columbia University	Improving understanding between fields of chemistry and toxicology		
Natural Sciences	Chemistry	James D. White	Oregon State University	Organic geochemistry		
Natural Sciences	Computer Science	Richard Cole	New York University			
Natural Sciences	Computer Science	David P. Dobkin	Princeton University	Research at Xerox PARC		
Natural Sciences	Computer Science	Jayadev Misra	University of Texas at Austin			
Natural Sciences	Computer Science	Jeffrey D. Ullman	Stanford University			
Natural Sciences	Earth Science	Donald W. Forsyth	Brown University			
Natural Sciences	Earth Science	Donald R. Prothero	Occidental College			
Natural Sciences	Earth Science	J. William Schopf	UCLA		Also won in 1973	
Natural Sciences	Earth Science	Lynn Sykes	Columbia University	Research at University of Wellington		
Natural Sciences	Earth Science	David Walker	Columbia University			
Natural Sciences	Engineering	Howard Brenner	Massachusetts Institute of Technology			
Natural Sciences	Engineering	Robert W. Dutton	Stanford University	Research in Japan		
Natural Sciences	Engineering	William B. Krantz	University of Colorado, Boulder			
Natural Sciences	Mathematics	Gerd Faltings	Princeton University	Mordell conjecture		
Natural Sciences	Mathematics	Victor Guillemin	Massachusetts Institute of Technology			
Natural Sciences	Mathematics	John N. Mather	Princeton University			
Natural Sciences	Mathematics	Wilfried Schmid	Harvard University		Also won in 1973	
Natural Sciences	Mathematics	Barry Simon	California Institute of Technology	Research at the Institute for Advanced Study		
Natural Sciences	Medicine & Health	Chester A. Alper	Harvard Medical School			
Natural Sciences	Neuroscience	Carmine Domenic Clemente	UCLA			
Natural Sciences	Molecular & Cellular Biology	Gerald David Fasman	Brandeis University	Conformational studies of protein transport	Also won in 1974	
Natural Sciences	Molecular & Cellular Biology	Robert B. Gennis	University of Illinois Urbana-Champaign			
Natural Sciences	Molecular & Cellular Biology	Judith P. Klinman	UC Berkeley	Hydrogen tunneling in enzyme reactions		
Natural Sciences	Molecular & Cellular Biology	Michael Rosbash	Brandeis University	Gene-splicing mechanisms		
Natural Sciences	Molecular & Cellular Biology	Carl W. Schmid	UC Davis	Research at Yale University		
Natural Sciences	Molecular & Cellular Biology	Dieter Söll	Yale University		Also won in 1972	
Natural Sciences	Molecular & Cellular Biology	Cheng-Wen Wu	SUNY Stony Brook			
Natural Sciences	Organismic Biology & Ecology	Jerry A. Coyne	University of Chicago			
Natural Sciences	Organismic Biology & Ecology	Mimi A. R. Koehl	UC Berkeley	Gigantism in fossil insects		
Natural Sciences	Organismic Biology & Ecology	Richard K. Koehn	SUNY Stony Brook			
Natural Sciences	Organismic Biology & Ecology	David C. Queller	Rice University	Social behavior of plant life		
Natural Sciences	Organismic Biology & Ecology	Ramon J. Rhine	UC Riverside	Wild baboons		
Natural Sciences	Organismic Biology & Ecology	Marvalee H. Wake	UC Berkeley	Evolutionary biology of the caecilian amphibians		
Natural Sciences	Organismic Biology & Ecology	George C. Williams	SUNY Stony Brook			
Natural Sciences	Physics	Louise A. Dolan	Rockefeller University			
Natural Sciences	Physics	Michael S. Witherell	UC Santa Barbara	Bottom quark		
Natural Sciences	Plant Sciences	Fakhri A. Bazzaz	Harvard University			
Natural Sciences	Plant Sciences	Colin Allen Wraight	University of Illinois Urbana-Champaign			
Natural Sciences	Plant Sciences	Robert Edward Wyatt	University of Georgia	Plant reproduction		
Social Sciences	Anthropology & Cultural Studies	Patricia Rieff Anawalt	UCLA	Established a databank of textile motifs from the Aztec period		
Social Sciences	Anthropology & Cultural Studies	Overton Brent Berlin	UC Berkeley	Foundations of ethnobiological classification		
Social Sciences	Anthropology & Cultural Studies	Robert Boyd	UCLA			
Social Sciences	Anthropology & Cultural Studies	Michael E. Moseley	University of Florida	Regional land loss patterns, using high-altitude space shuttle imagery		
Social Sciences	Anthropology & Cultural Studies	Fred R. Myers	New York University			
Social Sciences	Anthropology & Cultural Studies	Randall K. White	New York University			
Social Sciences	Economics	Richard A. Easterlin	University of Southern California			
Social Sciences	Economics	Jon Elster	University of Chicago	Principles for allocating scarce resources		
Social Sciences	Economics	David M. Kreps	Stanford University			
Social Sciences	Economics	Donald G. Saari	Northwestern University			
Social Sciences	Economics	Jean M. Tirole	Massachusetts Institute of Technology			
Social Sciences	Economics	Halbert L. White	UC San Diego	How neural network modeling might be applied to economic theory		
Social Sciences	Education	Jeanne Bamberger	Massachusetts Institute of Technology	Development of musical intelligence		
Social Sciences	Geography & Environmental Studies	Michael James Dear	University of Southern California			
Social Sciences	Geography & Environmental Studies	John C. Hudson	Northwestern University			
Social Sciences	Law	Jules L. Coleman	Yale University	The market paradigm		
Social Sciences	Law	Michael J. Graetz	Yale University			
Social Sciences	Law	Richard S. Markovits	University of Texas at Austin			
Social Sciences	Political Science	Peter Katzenstein	Cornell University	West Germany and Japan in the postwar world		
Social Sciences	Political Science	Robert D. Putnam	Harvard University	Interaction between domestic politics and international affairs		
Social Sciences	Political Science	Allen Schick	University of Maryland at College Park	Evolution of the legislation passed by Congress		
Social Sciences	Political Science	Ian Shapiro	Yale University	A naturalist theory of politics		
Social Sciences	Psychology	Richard N. Aslin	University of Rochester	Perceptual development and motor control in human infants		
Social Sciences	Psychology	Steven W. Keele	University of Oregon	Relationship between cognitive operations and the human brain		
Social Sciences	Psychology	Mary Main	UC Berkeley	Methods of assessing parent-child attachment		
Social Sciences	Psychology	J. Philippe Rushton	University of Western Ontario			
Social Sciences	Psychology	David O. Sears	UCLA	Psychology of symbolic politics		
Social Sciences	Psychology	Elizabeth S. Spelke	Cornell University			
Social Sciences	Sociology	Peter Brandt Evans	UC San Diego			
Social Sciences	Sociology	Morris Rosenberg	University of Maryland			

== 1988 Latin American & Caribbean Fellows ==
Category	Field of Study	Fellow	Institutional association	Research topic	Notes	Ref
Creative Arts	Fiction	Magali García Ramis	Universidad de Puerto Rico	Las horas del sur (published 2005)		
Creative Arts	Fiction	Patricio Manns		Writing		
Creative Arts	Fiction	Elvira Orphée		Writing		
Creative Arts	Fiction	Alberto Ruy Sanchez Lacy	Artes de México	Writing		
Creative Arts	Film	Marilú Mallet		Filmmaking		
Creative Arts	Film	Valeria Sarmiento		Filmmaking		
Creative Arts	Fine Arts	Osmar Pinheiro de Souza Jr	Universidade de São Paulo	Painting		
Creative Arts	Fine Arts	Jorge Tacla		Painting: Work in the Atacama Desert		
Creative Arts	Photography	Graciela Iturbide		Fiesta y muerte, a project about Día de los Muertos celebrations		
Creative Arts	Poetry	Tamara Kamenszain	Universidad de Buenos Aires	Writing		
Humanities	Iberian & Latin American History	Juan Carlos Herken Krauer	Centro Paraguayo de Estudios Sociológicos	Economic history of Paraguay, 1811-1950		
Humanities	Iberian & Latin American History	Scarlett O'Phelan Godoy	Pontificia Universidad Católica del Perú	European immigrants in Peru, 1770-1835		
Humanities	Iberian & Latin American History	Maria de Los Angeles Romero Frizzi	Instituto Nacional de Antropología e Historia			
Humanities	Literary Criticism	Pablo Antonio Cuadra	Academia Nicaragüense de la Lengua	Central American literature		
Humanities	Theatre Arts	Ernesto Carlos Schóó				
Natural Sciences	Astronomy & Astrophysics	Luis Felipe Rodríguez	Universidad Nacional Autónoma de México	Radio astronomical studies of regions of star formation		
Natural Sciences	Chemistry	Miguel José Yacamán	Universidad Nacional Autónoma de México			
Natural Sciences	Chemistry	Jorge Emilio Ponce-Hornos	Universidad de Buenos Aires	Energetics of the heart muscle		
Natural Sciences	Earth Science	Jorge Simon Lomnitz Adler	Universidad Nacional Autónoma de México	Earthquake dynamics		
Natural Sciences	Mathematics	Francisco Thaine Prada	Queen's University and University of Maryland (visiting fellow)	Algebraic number theory		
Natural Sciences	Neuroscience	Alfredo Osvaldo Donoso	Universidad Nacional de Cuyo	Role of brain transmitters in the control of hormone secretion		
Natural Sciences	Organismic Biology & Ecology	Philip M. Fearnside	Instituto Nacional de Pesquisas da Amazônia	Proposed World Bank projects around the world		
Natural Sciences	Physics	Carlos A. García Canal	Universidad Nacional de La Plata			
Natural Sciences	Plant Sciences	Mario Rajchenberg	Universidad de Buenos Aires	Polypores		
Natural Sciences	Plant Sciences	Bernabé Santelices	Pontificia Universidad Católica de Chile	Ecological concepts for marine algal production		
Social Sciences	Education	Carlos E. Vasco	Universidad Nacional de Colombia			
Social Sciences	Political Science	Arnaldo Córdova	Universidad Nacional Autónoma de México			
Social Sciences	Political Science	Ernesto Laclau	University of Essex			

== See also ==
- Guggenheim Fellowship
- List of Guggenheim Fellowships awarded in 1987
- List of Guggenheim Fellowships awarded in 1989
