= James P. White =

James P. White may refer to:

- James P. White (writer), writer and executive director of the Christopher Isherwood Foundation
- James White (New Mexico politician), member of the New Mexico House of Representatives

== See also ==
- James P. White House, Belfast, Maine
