= Manuel Raimundo Querino =

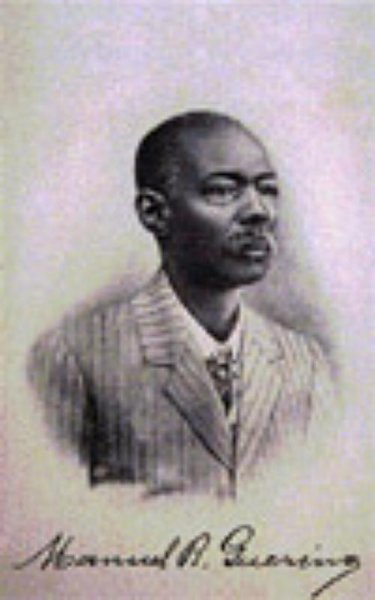
- Born: 28 July 1851; Santo Amaro, Bahia
- Died: February 14, 1923 (aged 71)
- Occupations: Ethnographer, Artist, Abolitionist

Manuel Raimundo Querino (July 28, 1851 - February 14, 1923) was a prominent Afro-Brazilian artist and intellectual. Querino's pioneering ethnographic works focused on the contributions of Africans to Brazilian history and culture. Assessing his contributions, the historian E. Bradford Burns observes, "Querino was the first black to write Brazilian history, a task to which he brought a much-needed perspective."

== Early life ==
Querino was born in Santo Amaro, Bahia in 1851. In 1855, it is believed that both his parents (possibly foster parents) died during the cholera epidemic. Left an orphan at the age of four, he was sent to Salvador, where he was raised by a guardian, Manuel Correia Garcia, a journalist and professor at the Normal School, who founded the Instituto Histórico da Bahia in 1856. Correia Garcia had Querino apprenticed as a painter-decorator, but his ward had greater ambitions. He also benefited from his guardian's social and political connections, particularly two members of Correia Garcia's circle: Manuel Pinto de Sousa Dantas and Miguel Navarro Cañizares.

At age seventeen, Querino travelled to Pernambuco and later Piauí. There, he was recruited (possibly by force) into the Brazilian army. Instead of being sent to the front, when it was discovered that he could read and had excellent handwriting, Querino served as a clerk at his battalion's Rio de Janeiro headquarters during the Paraguayan War.

After the war ended in March 1870, Querino returned to Salvador, Bahia, demobilized with the help of Manuel Pinto de Sousa Dantas. He worked by day as a painter-decorater while becoming a founding student of Salvador's Liceu de Artes e Ofícios and the Academia de Belas Artes (now the Escola de Belas Artes). He became a pupil of the Spanish artist Miguel Navarro Cañizares, who founded the Escola de Belas Artes. Querino graduated from the Academia in geometric design and taught at the Liceu and at the Colégio de Órfãos de São Joaquim, the orphanage where he had been taken as a child. He produced two textbooks on geometric design.

Manuel Querino was active in politics as a labor leader, city councillor and abolitionist, publishing and editing a newspaper entitled A Provincia, which favoured the abolition of slavery, and joining the Bahian Abolition Society.

He later co-founded the Partido Operário (Workers' Party) and the Liga Operária Baiana (Bahian Workers' League). He also published and edited a short-lived newspaper entitled O Trabalho (Labor) that advocated professional education for the formerly enslaved people emancipated following Abolition in 1888.

Querino was a founder and charter member of the Geographical and Historical Institute of Bahia (Instituto Geográfico e Histórico da Bahia) in 1894. According to Burns, his research brought some consideration of Afro-Brazilian perspectives and sources to Brazilian history. Querino completed oral history interviews to gather information from Black Bahians. He also used his contacts with Salvador's white elite to advocate for practitioners of Afro-Brazilian religions like Candomblé.

Querino engaged in intellectual debates against the racist and elitist science of his time, spearheaded by pathologist Raimundo Nina Rodrigues.

He was also the first scholar to publish biographies of Bahian artists - considered the Brazilian Vasari - and pioneered food studies by producing a book on Bahian cuisine that was published after his death with the help of his son Paulo Querino and his friend J. Teixeira Barros.

== In popular culture ==
The famous Bahian writer Jorge Amado drew on his story as an inspiration for creating his character Pedro Archanjo, the central figure of his 1969 novel Tenda dos Milagres (Tent of Miracles).

== Quotations from his works ==
"Bahia reaches superiority, excellence, and primacy in the culinary art of the country as the African element, with its exquisite seasoning of exotic fertilizers, altered profoundly the Portuguese delicacies, which resulted in a completely national product, tasty, pleasant to the palate yet demanding, which surpasses the righteous fame of Bahian cuisine." (QUERINO, 1922, p. 23)

"Brazil possesses two real treasures: the fertility of its soil and the skills of its mixed-race people." (Querino 1918: The Black Settler as a Factor of Brazilian Civilization) Jorge Amado used these words as an epigraph in his novel Tent of Miracles.

== Works ==
- Desenho linear das classes elementares (Linear drawing of the elementary classes), 1903
- Elementos de desenho geometrico (Elements of geometric drawing), 1911
- Artistas baianos (Bahian artists), Rio de Janeiro, 1909
- As artes na Bahia (The arts in Bahia), Salvador, 1909
- Bailes pastoris (Pastoral dances), Salvador, 1914
- A raça africana e seus costumes na Bahia (The African race and its customs in Bahia), In: Anais do Congresso Brasileiro V of Geography, Salvador, 1916
- A Bahia de Outrora (Olden-day Bahia), Salvador 1916
- O colono preto como fator da civilização brasileira (The Black Settler as a Factor in Brazilian Civilization), 1918
- A arte culinária na Bahia (Culinary Arts in Bahia) 1928 - highlights the African contribution to Bahian cuisine
