= Angelina Vásquez =

Chilean documentary filmmaker (born 1950)

- Born: 1950 (age 75–76); Santiago de Chile
- Occupations: Film editor, director, screenwriter

Angelina Vásquez (born 1950) is a Chilean documentary filmmaker who was exiled to Finland following the 1973 Chilean coup but returned to film clandestinely during the Pinochet dictatorship in the early 1980s. Like Marilú Mallet in Canada and Valeria Sarmiento in France, she is notable as one of the first Chilean women film directors, emerging in the early 1970s but producing most of her work in exile.

== Filmography ==
- Crónica del salitre (1971)
- Dos años en Finlandia (1975)
- Así nace un desaparecido (1977)
- Gracias a la vida (o la pequeña historia de una mujer maltratada) (1980)
- Presencia lejana (1982)
- Apuntes nicaragüenses (1982)
- Fragmentos de un diario inacabado (1983)
- Notas para un retrato de familia (1989)
- Empresarias de Madrid (1989)

== Bibliography ==
- Elizabeth Ramírez and Catalina Donoso (eds.) Nomadías. El cine de Marilú Mallet, Valeria Sarmiento y Angelina Vásquez (Ediciones Metales Pesados, 2016) ISBN 9568415882, ISBN 9789568415884
