= Marvin Bell =

American poet and teacher (1937–2020)

Marvin Hartley Bell (August 3, 1937 – December 14, 2020) was an American poet and teacher who was the first Poet Laureate of the state of Iowa.

== Early life and education ==
Bell was raised in Center Moriches on Long Island. He served in the U.S. Army from 1964 to 1965 at the rank of First Lieutenant, and he was a licensed amateur radio operator. He earned his bachelor's degree from Alfred University, his master's degree from the University of Chicago, and a MFA from the University of Iowa Writers' Workshop.

== Career ==
He was the author of more than 20 books of poetry, including The Book of the Dead Man (Copper Canyon Press, 1994), Ardor: The Book of the Dead Man, Vol. 2 (Copper Canyon Press, 1997), Nightworks: Poems 1962–2000 (Copper Canyon Press, 2000), Mars Being Red (Copper Canyon Press, 2007), and Vertigo: The Living Dead Man Poems (Copper Canyon Press, 2011).

Bell's first nationally distributed book, A Probable Volume of Dreams, was awarded the Lamont Poetry Prize of the Academy of American Poets in 1969. Other honors for his work include Guggenheim and National Endowment for the Arts (NEA) fellowships, and Fulbright appointments to Yugoslavia and Australia. In 2000 Bell was appointed the first Poet Laureate for the state of Iowa.

Bell taught for forty years at the Iowa Writers' Workshop at the University of Iowa, retiring as the Flannery O'Connor Professor of Letters. Bell held numerous visiting lectureships at universities, including Goddard College, Oregon State University, the University of Hawaii, Wichita State University, Portland State University, and the University of Washington. He served on the faculty of the Master of Fine Arts in Writing program at Pacific University in Oregon.

Bell's former students include Marilyn Chin, Rita Dove, Norman Dubie, James Galvin, Albert Goldbarth, Jorie Graham, Joy Harjo, Juan Felipe Herrera, Denis Johnson, Larry Levis, Jordan Smith (poet), David St. John, Michael Simms and James Tate.

Bell wrote poems protesting the war on terror in Afghanistan and Iraq Wars and gave readings for Poets Against the War.

Bell edited and published the literary magazine Statements from 1959 to 1964. He edited poetry for the reborn North American Review from 1964 to 1969 and The Iowa Review from 1969 to 1971. In 1988, Bell was among three judges for that year's National Poetry Competition sponsored by The Chester H. Jones Foundation. He designed, and for five years led, a summer program for selected teachers from the urban public school program. He also edited the New Poets/Short Books series published by the literary publisher Lost Horse Press for five years.

== Personal life ==
He lived in Port Townsend, Washington and Iowa City, Iowa.

== Death ==
He died on December 14, 2020.

== Honors ==
- American Academy of Arts and Letters Award in Literature
- Guggenheim and National Endowment for the Arts fellowships
- Senior Fulbright appointments to Yugoslavia and Australia
- Flannery O'Connor Professor of Letters at the University of Iowa
- Iowa's first Poet Laureate
- Honorary doctorates: Albert University, Union College
- National Book Award finalist
- Los Angeles Times Poetry Award finalist
- Lamont Poetry Selection of the Academy of American Poets

== Bibliography ==
Poetry

- Incarnate: The Collected Dead Man Poems, Copper Canyon Press, 2019.
- Vertigo: The Living Dead Man Poems, Copper Canyon Press, 2011.
- Whiteout (photographs by Nathan Lyons), Lodima, 2011.
- A Primer about the Flag (illustrations by Chris Raschka, for children), Candlewick Press, 2011.
- 7 Poets, 4 Days, 1 Book, Trinity University Press, 2009.
- Mars Being Red, Copper Canyon Press, 2007.
- Rampant, Copper Canyon Press, 2004.
- Nightworks: Poems, 1962–2000, Copper Canyon Press, 2000.
- Wednesday: Selected Poems 1966–1997, Salmon Publishing (Ireland), 1998.
- Poetry for a Midsummer's Night, Seventy Fourth Street Productions (Seattle), 1998.
- Ardor: The Book of the Dead Man, Vol. 2, Copper Canyon Press, 1997.
- A Marvin Bell Reader (selected prose and poetry), Middlebury College Press/University Press of New England, 1994.
- The Book of the Dead Man, Copper Canyon Press, 1994.
- Iris of Creation, Copper Canyon Press, 1990.
- New and Selected Poems, Athenaeum, 1987.
- Drawn by Stones, by Earth, by Things That Have Been in the Fire, Athenaeum, 1984.
- These Green-Going-to-Yellow, Athenaeum, 1981.
- Stars Which See, Stars Which Do Not See, Athenaeum, 1977. (Reissued, Carnegie Mellon Classic Contemporary Series, 1992.)
- Residue of Song, Athenaeum, 1974.
- The Escape into You, Athenaeum, 1971. (Reissued, Carnegie Mellon Classic Contemporary Series, 1994.)
- A Probable Volume of Dreams, Athenaeum, 1969.
- Things We Dreamt We Died For, Stone Wall Press, 1966.

Letters, Essays and Interviews

- After the Fact: Scripts & Postscripts (co-authored with Christopher Merrill), White Pine Press, 2016.
- Segues: A Correspondence in Poetry (co-authored with William Stafford), David R. Godine, publisher, 1983.
- Old Snow Just Melting: Essays and Interviews, University of Michigan Press, 1983.
