= Li Taihuan =

Chinese contemporary artist

- 李台还
- Born: 1955 (age 70–71); Beijing, China
- Education: Fine Arts Beijing
- Known for: Painting, sculpting
- Website: www.litaihuan.com/index_en.html

Li Taihuan (Chinese: 李台还; born 1955) is a Chinese contemporary artist based in Beijing.

== Artistic career ==
Li Taihuan was Art Consultant of the China contemporary art show at the Centre National d'art et de Culture Georges Pompidou in France in 2005.

In the Nord Art 2012 exhibition at the Kunstwerk Carlshütte in Germany, featuring work of internationally acclaimed artists in the warehouse-style and open air spaces, his work was exhibited in the China Pavilion exhibition "Forms of the Formless" (无形之星形).

In 2012, the National Museum of China opened his solo show exhibition. In the opening ceremonies, Huang Yongyu (Chinese name 黄永玉) was present.

In 2014, his work was shown in "Tales of Two Cities: New York & Beijing" at the Bruce Museum in New York, showing a visual pairing of five Beijing-based and five New York-based contemporary artists. In this exhibition, his work was paired with that of Jorge Tacla. In this ambitious project, the ten artists were, prior to the exhibition, engaged in five different global, cross-cultural, artistic dialogues over the course of two years via email, Skype, in person, sometimes with translators, about issues ranging from political and social upheaval, the concept of global culture, and questions about materials and techniques.

In 2014, he held his solo exhibition of painting and sculpture at the Galerie 18 in Paris.

== Artistic work ==
Li Taihuan works in the painting and sculptural mediums. Although his sculptures might be considered as having a pop art or kitsch esthetic, he describes his sculptural work as being identical to his paintings. "I attempt to establish a relation between the sculpture and the furniture item. The furniture item is a sculpture and the sculpture has a specific function. I work on the basis that architecture, sculpture and furniture are closely linked. It is a way of changing our established conscience of these mediums."

Li Taihuan has defined his philosophy of art, stating: "The artist should not be limited by the object or the form to give a very fine interpretation of it... From close up, the image, the painting or the visual are composed by a multitude of lines of colours, almost abstract. As you progressively take distance you take from the piece, you discover a landscape. My brush doesn't define forms, it contracts forms, reinforcing contradictory links and the interplay. the calligraphy method pervades the reflection of the artist, not only in his creative process but also in how he feels".

== Selected bibliography ==
- Solo Exhibition of Li Taihuan, (Chinese: 李台还艺术展), National Museum of China 中国国家博物馆, October 2012
- Return of the Old Master: Li Taihuan show at the National Museum of China, (Chinese: 老将回归: 李台还国博办展) Art X, 2012
