= List of Dickinson College alumni =

This is a list of Dickinson College alumni. This list covers alumni from the first graduating class in July 1787 to the present.

- "DNG" indicates that the alumnus did not graduate.
- A "—" indicates that the information is unknown.

== Business ==
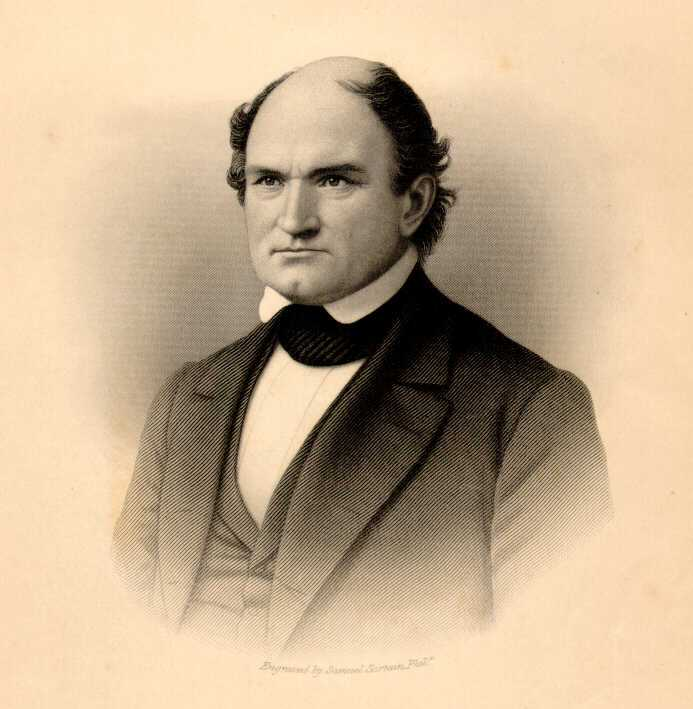
Alfred V. du Pont

Name	Class year	Notability	Ref(s)
Henry Clarke	1955	Built the Klondike brand and expanded it nationally	
John Curley	1960	Former CEO of Gannett News Corporation	
Alfred V. du Pont	1818	Head of the du Pont Company	
Stephen Duncan	1805	Cotton planter in the South prior to the Civil War, and second largest slave owner in the country	
Judith Faulkner	1965	Founder and CEO of Epic Systems	
David Hirshey	1971	Vice president and executive editor of HarperCollins publishers	
John Carmichael Jenkins	1828	Plantation owner, medical doctor and horticulturalist	
Andy MacPhail	1976	Major League Baseball executive	
Amy Nauiokas	1994	Founder and CEO of Archer Gray media production, finance, and venture capital company	
Leon Rose	1983	President of the New York Knicks	

== Arts and journalism ==
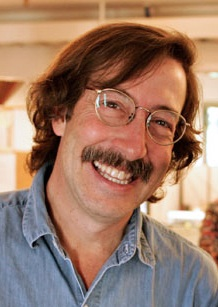
Rick Smolan

Name	Class year	Notability	Ref(s)
Spencer Bailey	2008	Editor-in-chief of Surface magazine	
Brock Clarke	1990	Author	
Rick Fisher	1976	Lighting designer, winner of 2009 Tony Award for Best Lighting Design in a Musical for Billy Elliot the Musical	
Kass Fleisher	1981	Author	
Adam Granduciel	2003	Frontman, guitarist, and songwriter for the indie rock band The War on Drugs	
Jennifer Haigh	1990	The New York Times best-selling author, winner of PEN/Hemingway Award	
Jennifer L. Holm	1990	Historical author, wrote three Newbery Honor books	
Kim Min-soo	2018	Beauty pageant winner, Miss Korea 2018	
George B. Murphy Jr.	1926	Newspaper editor, journalist, publicist, advertiser, and civil rights leader; editor-in-chief at The Washington Afro-American	
Clarence Muse	1911	Actor, director, composer, and writer	
Rosie O'Donnell	DNG	Stand-up comedian, actress, singer, and media personality	
Stuart Pankin	1968	Film and television actor	
Esther Popel	1919	First Black female graduate of Dickinson, African-American poet of the Harlem Renaissance, activist, and educator	
Jennifer Ringley	1997	Creator of JenniCam.org	
James R. Shepley	1939 (DNG)	Time, Life journalist, later president of Time Inc., received honorary degree in 1959	
Richard Sher	1970	Producer, creator and host of Says You!	
Rick Smolan	1972	Former Time, Life and National Geographic photographer	
Susan Stewart	1973	Poet and literary critic, MacArthur Fellow, member of the American Academy of Arts and Sciences, winner of the National Book Critics Circle Award	
Charles Strum	1970	Associate managing editor at The New York Times	

== Academics and education ==
Henry Louis Baugher

Name	Class year	Notability	Ref(s)
Neal B. Abraham	1972	Professor of Physics at Bryn Mawr College, vice president for academic affairs and dean of the College at DePauw University, and executive director of the Five College Consortium	
Henry Louis Baugher	1826	President of Pennsylvania (Gettysburg) College, Gettysburg, Pennsylvania	
Jeremiah Chamberlain	1814	2nd president of Centre College and the Centenary College of Louisiana	
Thomas Nelson Conrad	1857	Third president of Virginia Tech, then known as Virginia Agricultural and Mechanical College	
Fred Pierce Corson	1917	Twentieth president of Dickinson College; bishop of the Methodist Church	
William Durden	1971	President of Dickinson College	
John Goucher	1868	Founder, president, and namesake of Goucher College	
Francis Harvey Green	1893	Chair of English at West Chester Normal School and headmaster of the Pennington School	
Linda Dalrymple Henderson	1969	David Bruton, Jr. Centennial Professor of Art History, University of Texas at Austin	
Helen Schaeffer Huff	1903	Among the first women to receive a PhD in physics from a US institution	
Louis E. McComas	1866	Professor of International Law at Georgetown University Law Center	
Samuel Miller	1793	Presbyterian professor at Princeton Theological Seminary	
Chad Mirkin	1986	George Rathmann Professor of Chemistry and director of the International Institute for Nanotechnology at Northwestern University, recipient of the Kabiller Prize in Nanoscience and Nanomedicine, Wilhelm Exner Medal, William H. Nichols Medal, Dan David Prize, Linus Pauling Award, and American Institute of Chemists Gold Medal	
Elijah Barrett Prettyman	1848	Second principal of the Maryland State Normal School, now Towson University	
Lisa Rossbacher	1978	President of Humboldt State University	
Lawrence Shapiro	1984	Professor of Philosophy at the University of Wisconsin–Madison	
Susan Stewart	1973	Avalon Foundation University Professor in the Humanities and professor of English at Princeton University	
Marvin Wolfgang	1948	Professor of Sociology and Criminology at the University of Pennsylvania	
John C. Young	1823	Fourth president of Centre College	

== Government and public service ==
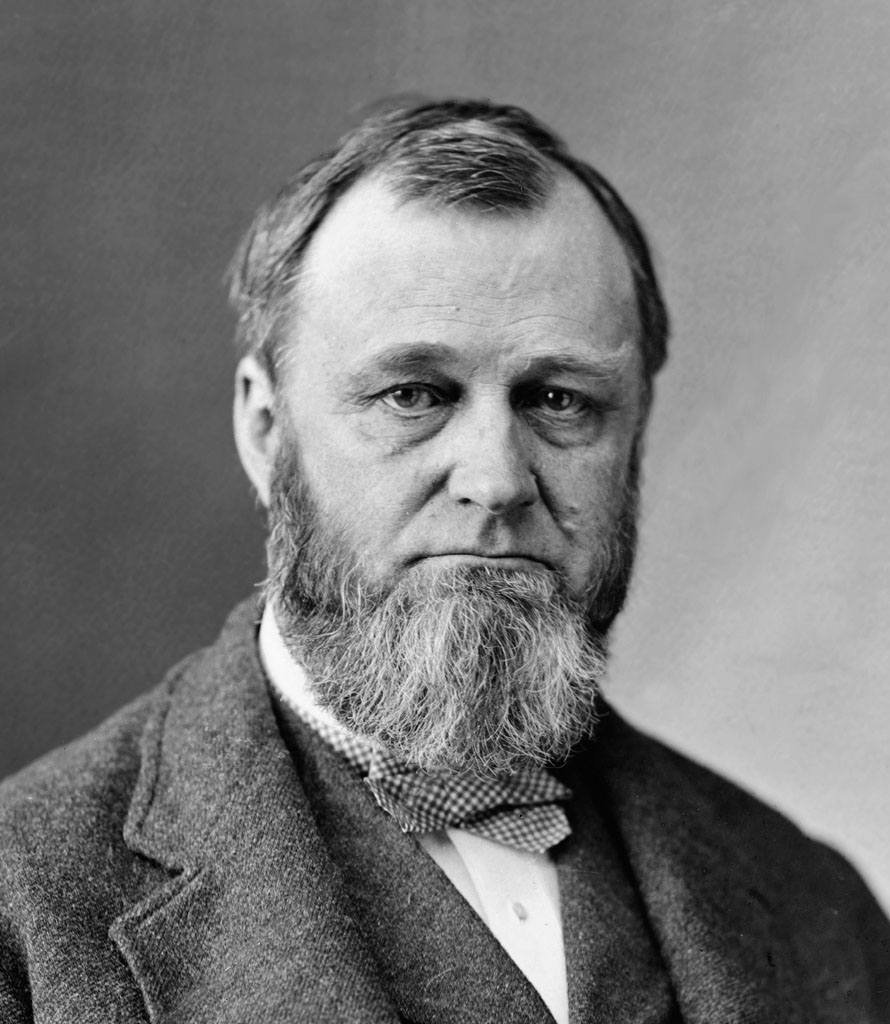
Spencer Fullerton Baird

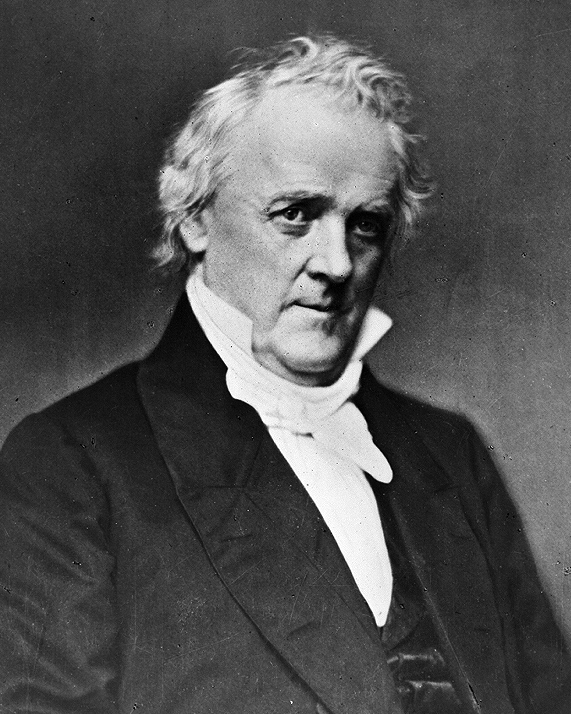
James Buchanan

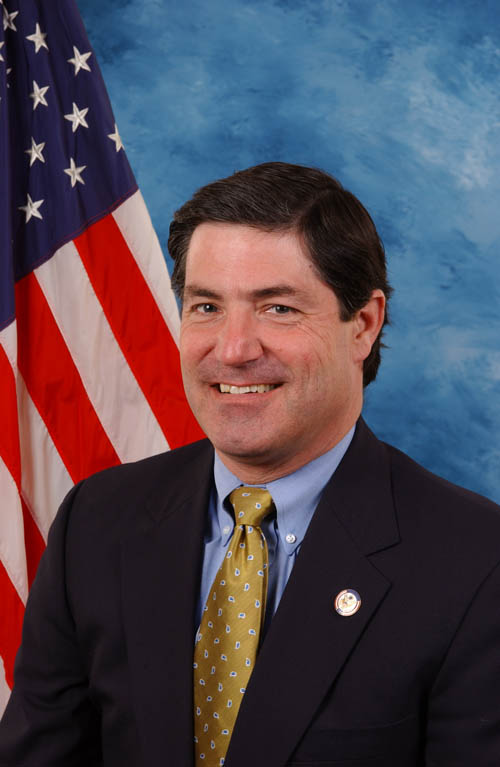
Jim Gerlach

Name	Class year	Notability	Ref(s)
Spencer Fullerton Baird	1840	U.S. secretary of the Smithsonian Institution	
Charles J. Baker	1841	Ex-officio mayor of Baltimore	
Mark A. Barnett	1985	Judge of the United States Court of International Trade	
Daniel Moore Bates	1839	Secretary of state of Delaware and US attorney for the district of Delaware	
Richard L. T. Beale	DNG	U.S. representative	
Joseph M. Belford	1871	U.S. representative	
John O. Bennett	DNG	Former state senator of New Jersey	
William H. Bright Jr.	1984	Associate justice of the Connecticut Supreme Court	
James Buchanan	1809	Fifteenth president of the United States	
William W. Caldwell	1948	Judge of the United States District Court for the Middle District of Pennsylvania	
Philip L. Cannon	1870 (DNG)	Lieutenant governor of Delaware (1901–1905)	
William Creighton Jr.	1795	United States representative from Ohio; judge of the United States District Court for the District of Ohio	
John Creswell	1848	United States senator, U.S. representative; U.S. Postmaster General, first member of Congress to propose a constitutional amendment banning slavery	
Harmar Denny	1813	U.S. representative	
John D. C. Duncan Jr.		Maryland state delegate and state senator	
Ninian Edwards	1792	Third governor of Illinois, United States senator from Illinois	
Powhatan Ellis	1810	United States senator from Mississippi; judge of the United States District Court for the District of Mississippi	
Richard H. Ellis	1941	Former commander in chief of the Strategic Air Command	
Clement Finley	1815	10th Surgeon General of the United States Army	
George P. Fisher	1838	United States representative from Delaware; judge of the United States District Court for the District of Columbia	
George Gekas	1952	U.S. representative	
Jim Gerlach	1977	U.S. representative	
John Bannister Gibson	1800	Pennsylvania supreme court justice and chief justice	
Kermit Gosnell	1963	Former abortion doctor convicted of murder	
Donald E. Graves	1953	U.S. State Department Kremlinologist	
James C. Greenwood	1973	U.S. representative	
Robert Cooper Grier	1812	Associate justice of the Supreme Court of the United States 1846–1870	
Thomas B. Hayward	—	Member of the Maryland House of Delegates	
Peter Ihrie, Jr.	1815	U.S. representative	
John J. Jacob	1849	Fourth governor of West Virginia	
John E. Jones III	1977	Former judge of the United States District Court for the Middle District of Pennsylvania and 30th president of Dickinson College	
James A. Kenney, III	1959	Former judge of the Maryland Court of Special Appeals	
Horatio Collins King	1858	Judge advocate general for the New York National Guard, lawyer, and Civil War soldier, received the Medal of Honor	
Charles B. Lore	1852	U.S. representative, attorney general of Delaware, chief justice of the Delaware Supreme Court	
Edward Lucas	1809	U.S. representative	
Barry W. Lynn	1970	Executive director of Americans United for Separation of Church and State	
James William Marshall	1848	U.S. Postmaster General	
Lewis Linn McArthur	DNG	Oregon Supreme Court associate justice and newspaper publisher	
Robert McClelland	1829	U.S. representative, governor of Michigan, U.S. secretary of the interior	
Louis E. McComas	1866	United States senator from Maryland; United States representative from Maryland; judge of the United States Court of Appeals for the District of Columbia Circuit	
David Oh	1982	First Asian-American elected to the Philadelphia City Council	
Charles O'Neill	1840	U.S. representative	
J. Smith Orrick		Maryland state delegate	
Sylvia H. Rambo	1958	Judge of the United States District Court for the Middle District of Pennsylvania; chief judge, 1992–1999	
Stephen R. Reed	DNG	Mayor of Harrisburg, Pennsylvania, 1982–2010	
Jeffrey L. Schmehl	1977	Judge of the United States District Court for the Eastern District of Pennsylvania	
Bill Shuster	1983	U.S. representative	
Abraham Herr Smith	1840	U.S. representative for Pennsylvania's 9th congressional district 1873–1885	
George W. Smith	1949	U.S. Marine major general	
Zatae Leola Longsdorff Straw	1887	First woman to graduate from Dickinson, physician, member of the New Hampshire House of Representatives, president of the New Hampshire Department of the American Legion Auxiliary, first woman to serve as president of the American Medical Society	
Richard Barclay Surrick	1960	Judge of the United States District Court for the Eastern District of Pennsylvania	
Roger B. Taney	1795	Fifth chief justice of the United States	
Philip Francis Thomas	1830	Governor of Maryland, U.S. secretary of the treasury	
Lemuel Todd	1839	U.S. representative from Pennsylvania	
Emanuel Mac Troutman	1934	Judge of the United States District Court for the Eastern District of Pennsylvania	
Jonathan Hoge Walker	1787	Judge of the United States District Court for the Western District of Pennsylvania	
Isaac Wayne	1792	U.S. congressman, Pennsylvania state representative, Pennsylvania state senator	
Ross Wilkins	1816	Judge of the United States District Court for the Eastern District of Michigan	
William Wilkins	1802	U.S. representative, U.S. senator, secretary of war, and judge of the United States District Court for the Western District of Pennsylvania	
Lindsey Williams	2005	Pennsylvania state senator	
Stanley Zeigler	1971	Maine state representative	

== Religion ==
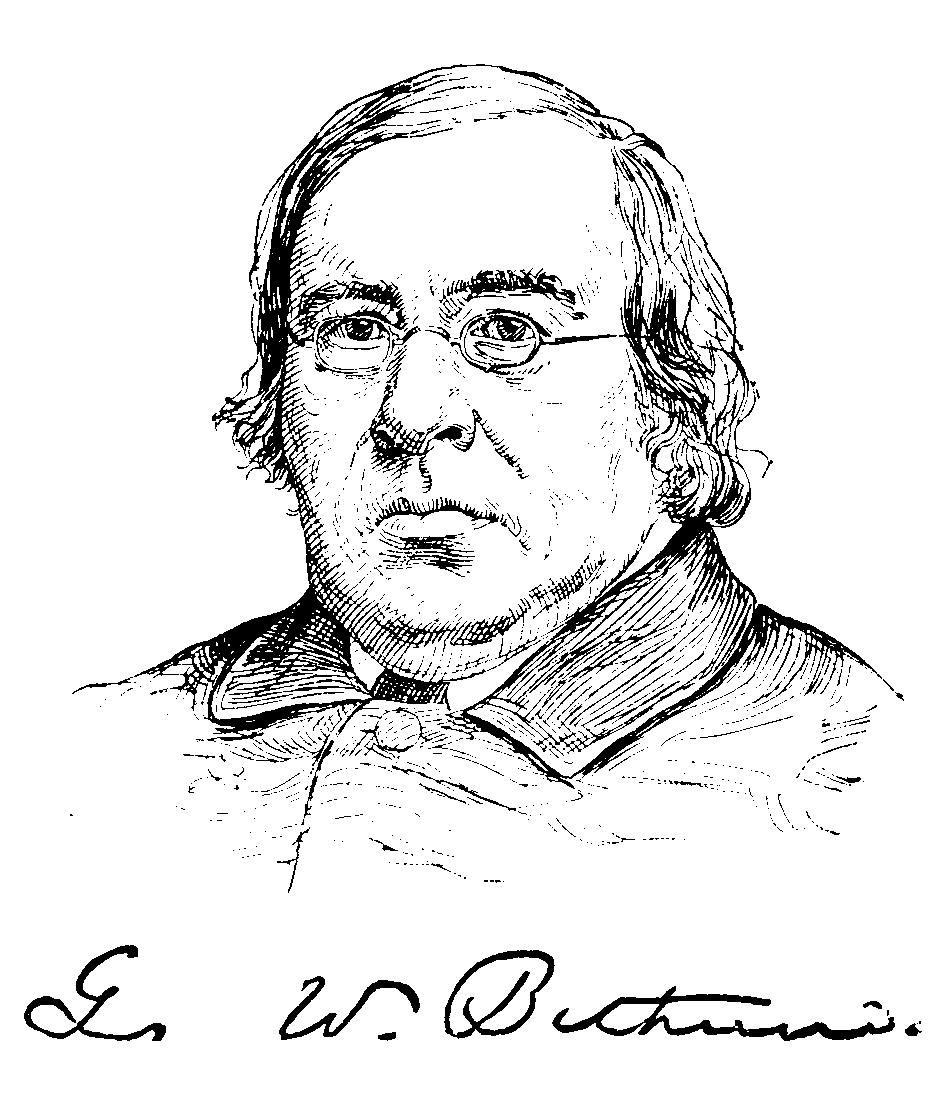
George Washington Bethune

Name	Class year	Notability	Ref(s)
George Washington Bethune	1822	Dutch Reformed minister and author	
Joseph Clemens	1894	U.S. Army chaplain, missionary and plant collector	
Moncure Conway	1849	Minister, author, abolitionist	
George R. Crooks	1840	Minister; editor of The Methodist; professor at Drew Theological Seminary	
George David Cummins	1841	Founder of Reformed Episcopal Church	
William Perry Eveland	1892	Bishop of the Methodist Episcopal Church	
Frederick Brown Harris	1909	Twice chaplain of the United States Senate	
John Swanel Inskip	1835 (DNG)	Minister, evangelist, president of the National Holiness Association	
John Wesley Lord	1927	Bishop of the Methodist Church, vice president of the National Council of Churches	
Robert Samuel Maclay	1845	Missionary who made pioneer contributions to the Methodist Episcopal missions in China, Japan and Korea	

== Sports ==
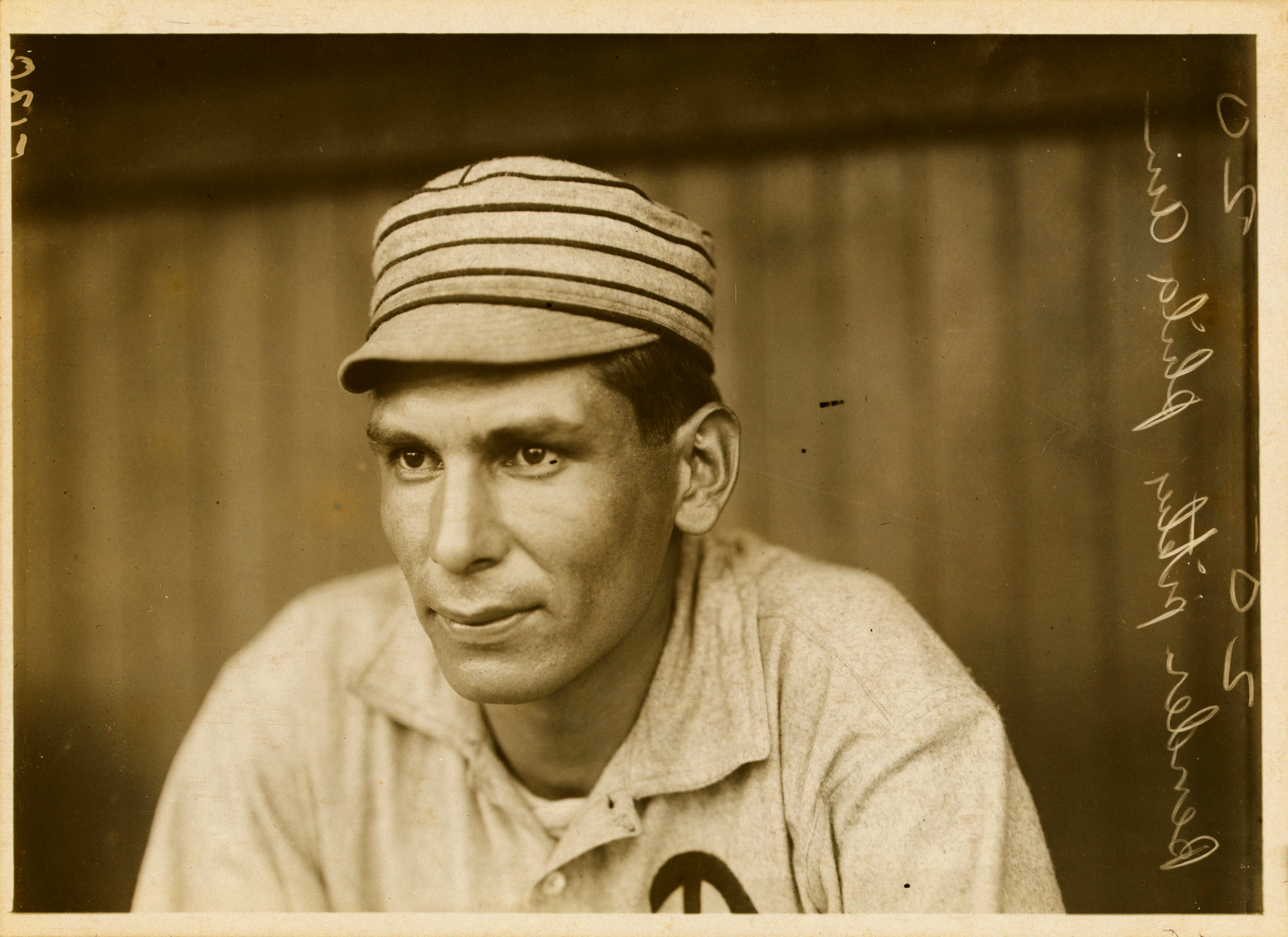
Chief Bender

Name	Class year	Notability	Ref(s)
Bull Behman	1923	NFL player with the Frankford Yellow Jackets and AFL player with the Philadelphia Quakers	
Chief Bender	1902	Hall of Fame baseball pitcher	
Bob Books	1926	NFL player with the Frankford Yellow Jackets	
John Carroll		Head basketball coach of the Boston Celtics and the University of Duquesne	
Bob Chesney	2000	Head football coach of the UCLA Bruins	
Steve Hoffman	1980	NFL coach with the Atlanta Falcons and Dallas Cowboys	
Joe Katchik	1954	AFL player with the New York Titans	
Frank Mount Pleasant	1910	US Olympic track & field athlete, 1904 Summer Olympics and 1908 Summer Olympics, first Native American to graduate from Dickinson	
Hikaru Nakamura	DNG	Chess player, Grandmaster, streamer	
Len Supulski	1943	NFL player with the Philadelphia Eagles	
