= Linda Dalrymple Henderson =

American art historian (born 1948)

- Born: Linda Dalrymple Henderson; 1948 (age 77–78); United States
- Occupations: Professor; Art historian Curator
- Awards: Guggenheim Fellow (1988); Robert W. Hamilton Book Award (1999)

Academic background
- Education: Dickinson College; Yale University
- Thesis: The Artist, The Fourth Dimension, and Non-Euclidean Geometry, 1900-1930: A Romance of Many Dimensions (1975)
- Doctoral advisor: Robert L. Herbert

Academic work
- Discipline: Modern art
- Institutions: University of Texas at Austin
- Doctoral students: Christina Cogdell

Linda Dalrymple Henderson (born 1948) is an American art historian, educator, and curator. Henderson is currently the David Bruton, Jr. Centennial Professor in Art History Emeritus at the University of Texas at Austin. Her research focuses on modern art, specifically twentieth-century American and European art.

== Career ==
Henderson entered Dickinson College planning to study mathematics, but graduated in 1969 with a Bachelor of Arts in Art History. She then continued on to Yale University to receive a Master of Arts in 1972 and a Doctor of Philosophy in 1975, both in Art History. Henderson wrote a doctoral dissertation focused on the fourth dimension in art, which was written under the supervision of Robert L. Herbert.

Beginning in her final years at Yale, Henderson held the position of Curator of Modern Art at the Museum of Fine Arts, Houston, from 1974 to 1977. A year later, she joined the faculty of the University of Texas at Austin, where she would remain for the rest of her career. In 2021, Henderson retired from the school as the David Bruton, Jr. Centennial Professor in Art History Emeritus.

In 1988, Henderson was awarded a Guggenheim Fellowship. In 1999, the University of Texas gave her their Robert W. Hamilton Book Award for her text on the artist Marcel Duchamp.

In 2008, Henderson curated an exhibition titled "Reimagining Space: The Park Place Gallery Group in 1960s," which focused on the Park Place Gallery, and was shown at the University of Texas at Austin's Blanton Museum of Art.

== Books ==
=== Author ===
- The Fourth Dimension and Non-Euclidean Geometry in Modern Art (Princeton University Press, 1983; enlarged ed., MIT Press, 2014)
- Duchamp in Context: Science and Technology in the Large Glass and Related Works (Princeton University Press, 1998)
- Reimagining Space: The Park Place Gallery Group in 1960s New York (exhibit catalog, Jack S. Blanton Museum of Art, 2008)

=== Editor ===
- From Energy to Information: Representation in Science and Technology, Art, and Literature (with Bruce Clarke, Stanford University Press, 2002)

== See also ==
- List of Dickinson College alumni
- List of Guggenheim Fellowships awarded in 1988
- List of University of Texas at Austin faculty
- List of Yale University people
