= Laura Volkerding =

American photographer

- Born: 1939; Louisville, KY
- Died: 1996 (aged 56–57)

Laura Volkerding (1939–1996) was an American photographer.

== Education ==
Volkerding received a BFA degree from the University of Louisville in 1961 and an MA degree in graphic design from the Institute of Design in Chicago in 1964.

== Career ==
=== Early career ===
Volkerding began her career as a printmaker. She also experimented with drawing and textiles. In 1972, much of her early work was destroyed in a fire..

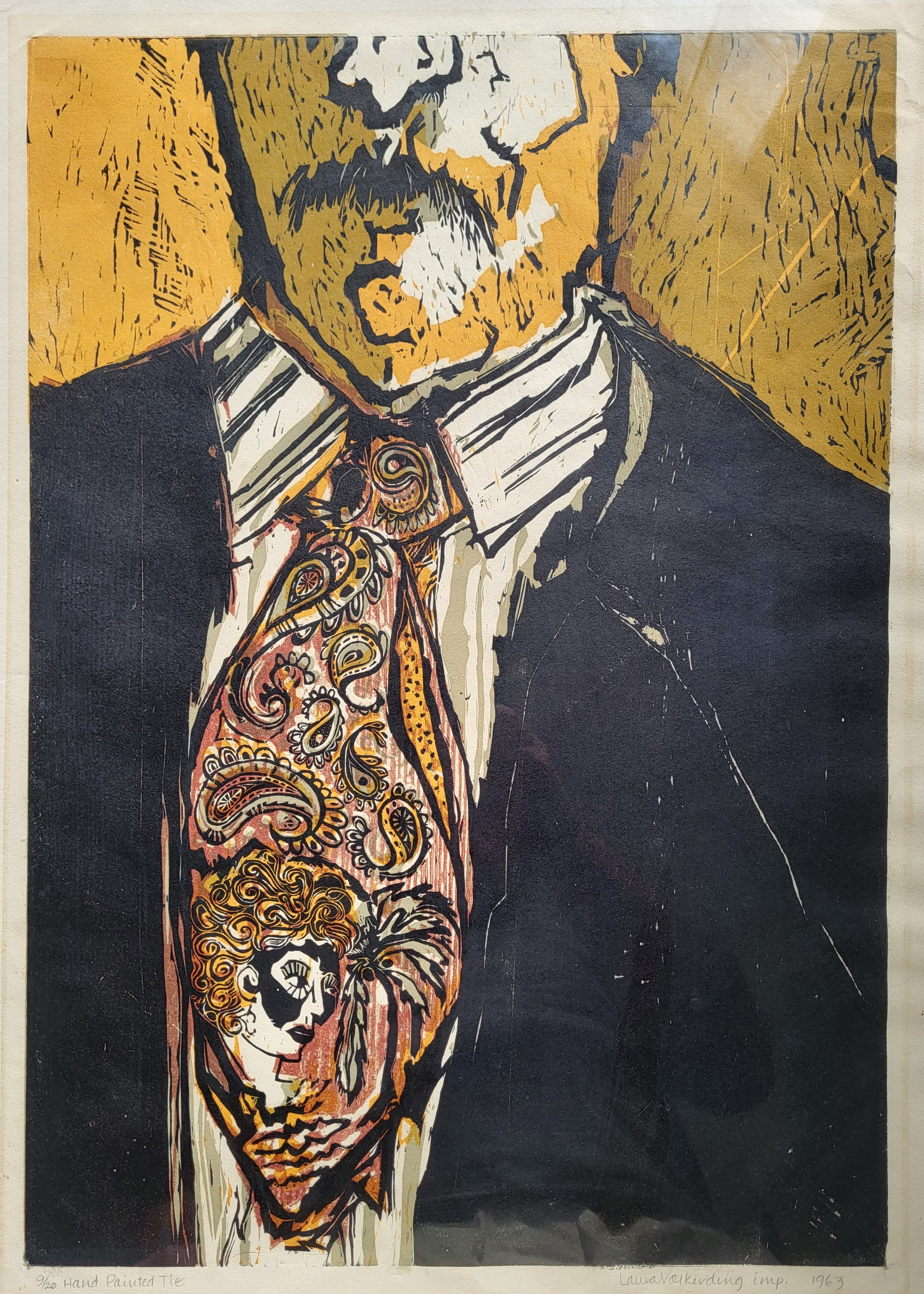
Hand Painted Tie, Intaglio Print, 1963

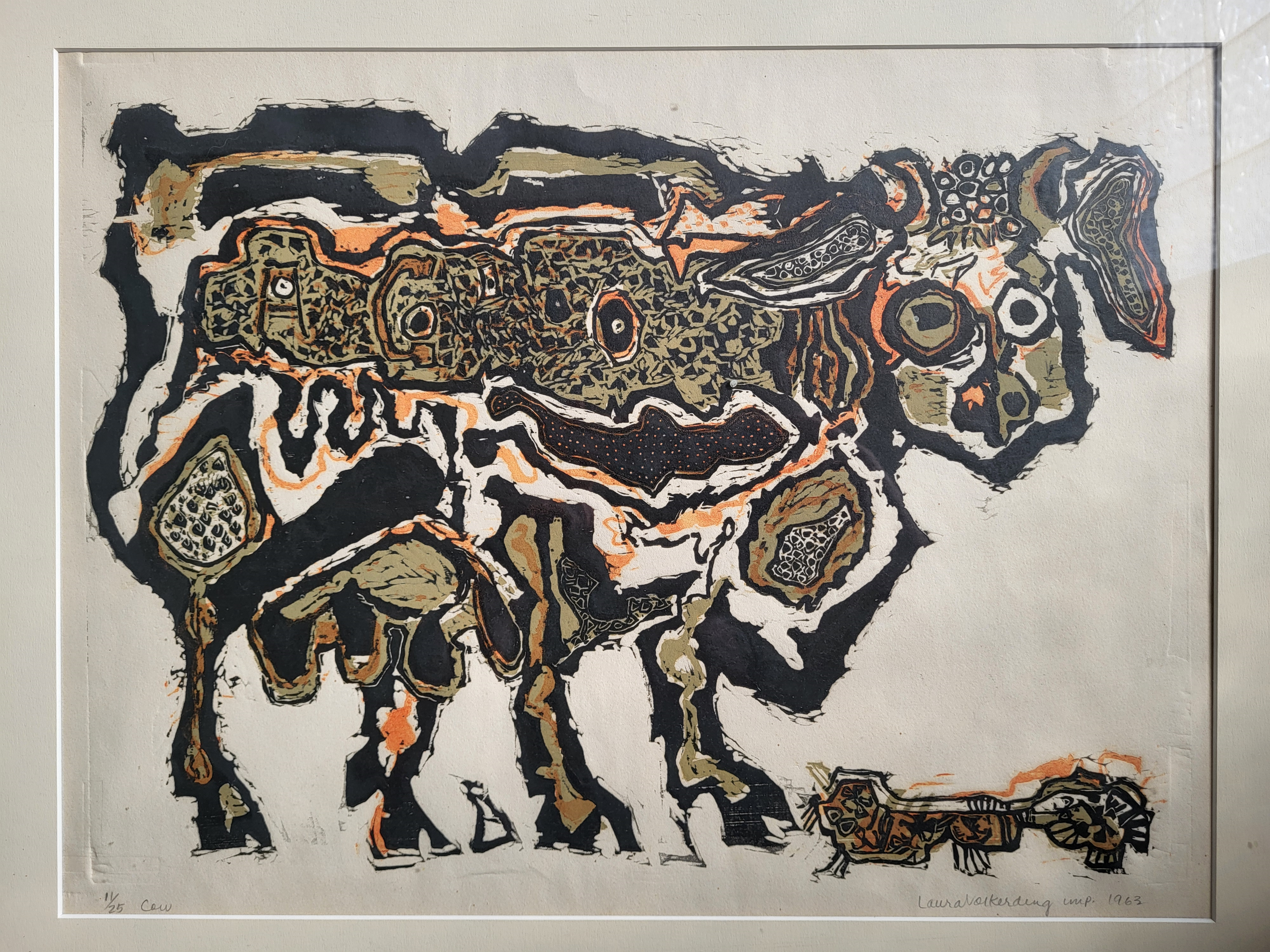
Cow, Intaglio Print, 1963

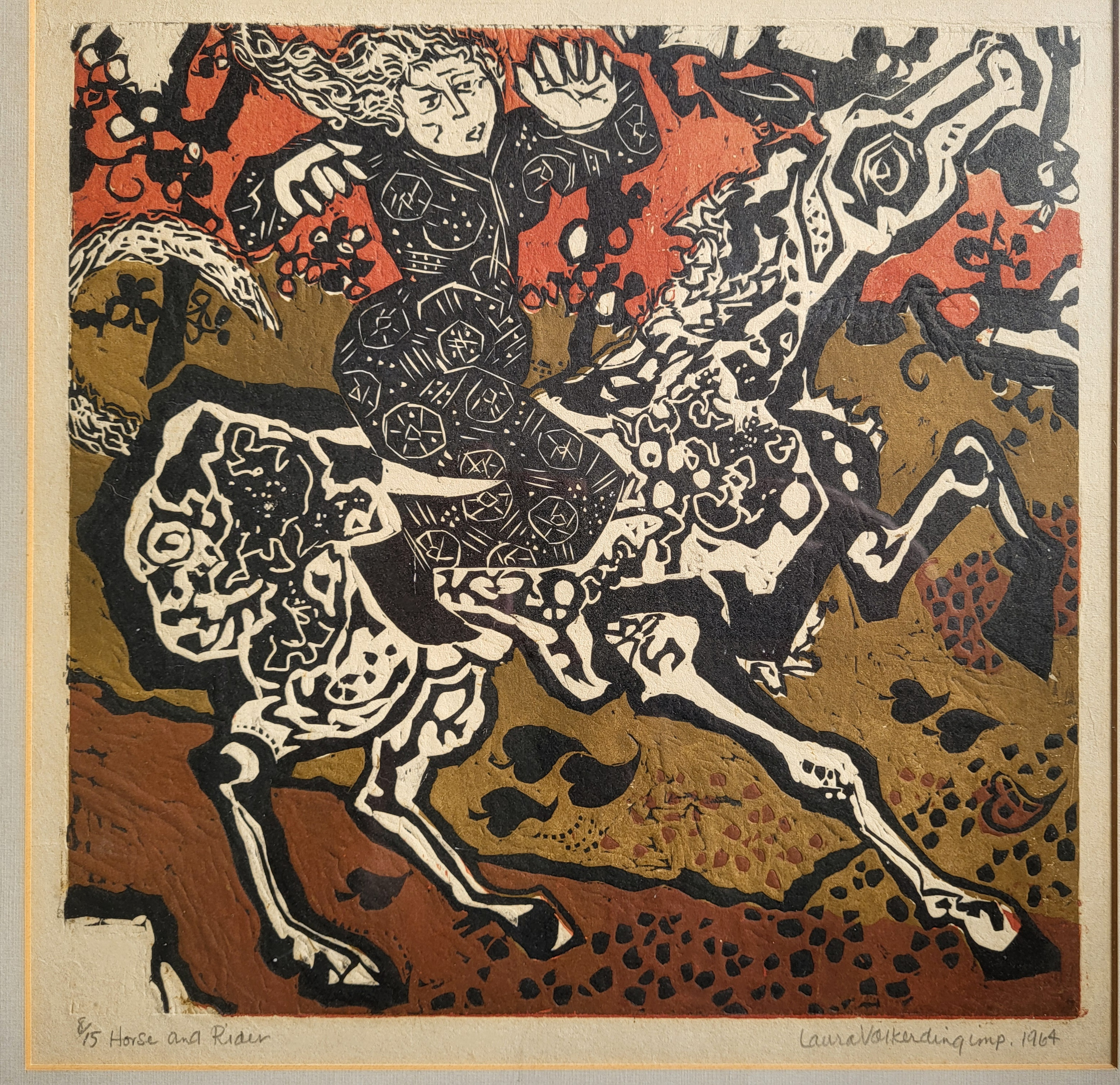
Horse and Rider, Intaglio Print, 1963

=== Photography ===
Her photographic career began in the 1960s, working first in 35mm format and then transitioning to larger formats. In the late 1970s he took medium format black and white photographs of inhabited landscapes, such as campgrounds, as well as panoramic photographs that ranged from diptychs to eight-part images. She is known for her photographs of the Compagnons du Devoir, master a group of French master artisans known for restoring historical monuments.

=== Teaching Career ===
Volkerding also taught at Rosary College and at the University of Chicago. Her last teaching position was at Stanford University in Palo Alto, California. She died as a result of a malignant brain tumor in 1996.

== Collections ==
Her work is included in the collections of the Smithsonian American Art Museum, the Metropolitan Museum of Art, the Art Institute of Chicago, the Cantor Arts Center at Stanford University, the Museum of Contemporary Photography, the Center for Creative Photography and the Museum of Modern Art, New York.
