= E. Bradford Burns =

American historian

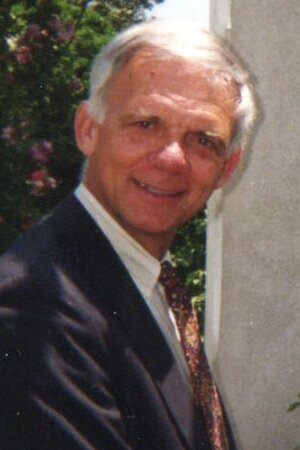
E Bradford Burns (cropped)

Edward Bradford Burns (1933-1995) was an American historian and university professor who specialized in Latin America, particularly Brazil and Nicaragua.

== Life ==
Born in Muscatine, Iowa, the son of Edward Sylvester and Wanda Adaline (Schwandke) Burns, he served in the US Naval Reserve from 1956 to 1959. He completed a BA at the University of Iowa in 1954, an MA from at Tulane in 1955 and a PhD from Columbia University in 1964. He lectured at UCLA and Columbia. At UCLA, he was the first Dean of the Honors Division in the College of Letters and Science.

Burns became briefly famous for his criticism of Ronald Reagan's stance on Nicaragua. It initially went unnoticed, such as when Burns wrote an article published in the NACLA Report on the Americas in 1983 about a North American Congress on Latin America visit to Nicaragua entitled "Reagan Hype Shuns Reality." Then, President Reagan publicly criticized an editorial Burns published on the US's Nicaragua policy, which led to what the professor described as "15 minutes of fame," including an interview on "Nightline." The US President accused Burns of spreading "disinformation" about the presence of officers from Somoza's National Guard among the Contras. Burns wrote an article about this experience, entitled "Me and the Prez," which was published in the LA Weekly of March 28, 1985.

Burns's first book, The Unwritten Alliance: Rio-Branco and Brazilian-American Relations, won the Bolton Prize. The Brazilian government awarded him the Order of Rio Branco in 1966. A corresponding member of the Instituto Histórico e Geográfico Brasileiro [Brazilian Historic and Geographic Institute], his numerous works also include A History of Brazil, Patriarch and Folk, and a bibliographical essay that was the first in English to highlight the contributions of the Afro-Brazilian intellectual Manuel Querino.

In A History of Brazil, Burns denounced the repressive methods of the military dictatorship that ruled Brazil from 1964 to 1985: "Extensive documentation details, between 1964 and 1979, more than 283 types of torture inflicted on 'dissidents,' at 242 clandestine torture centers, by 444 individual torturers. Victims still remain uncounted and unidentified, but many who lived through the military terror have since publicly described their ordeal."

A Professor Emeritus at UCLA, he died of liver cancer on December 19, 1995, and was survived by his mother, his sister, Karen Burns Kenny, and his life partner, David Aguayo.

== Selected works ==
- A History of Brazil (New York, NY: Columbia University Press, 1971)
- At War in Nicaragua: The Reagan Doctrine and the Politics of Nostalgia (New York, NY: Perennial Library/Harper & Row, 1987)
- "Bibliographical Essay: Manuel Querino's Interpretation of the African Contribution to Brazil" (The Journal of Negro History. 59 (1): 78–86, 1979)
- Latin America: A Concise Interpretive History (Lebanon, Indiana: Prentice Hall, 1994)
- Patriarch and Folk: The Emergence of Nicaragua, 1798-1858 (Cambridge, MA: Harvard University Press. 1991)
- The Poverty of Progress: Latin America in the Nineteenth Century (Berkeley, CA: University of California Press, 1980)
- The Unwritten Alliance: Rio-Branco and Brazilian-American Relations (New York: Columbia University Press, 1966)
