= Jordan Smith (poet) =

American poet and professor of English

- Born: Jordan F. Smith; September 11, 1954 (age 72); Fairport, New York, U.S.
- Education: Empire State College; Johns Hopkins University; University of Iowa (MFA)
- Occupations: Poet, professor

Jordan F. Smith (born September 11, 1954) is an American poet and professor at Union College in Schenectady, New York.

== Biography ==
Jordan Smith was born in Fairport, New York. He earned his bachelor's degree at Empire State College, his master's degree at Johns Hopkins University, and his master's of fine arts degree at the University of Iowa where he was a student of Marvin Bell. He was awarded a National Endowment for the Arts fellowship in 1984, Guggenheim Fellowship in 1988, and an Ingram Merrill Foundation fellowship Smith is the author of eight collections of poetry including An Apology for Loving the Old Hymns (1982), The Names of Things Are Leaving (2006), and Clare's Empire (2014). He is a contributor to AGNI, American Short Fiction, Antaeus (magazine), New England Review, Yale Review, Antioch Review, and New Hibernia Review. Smith is the Edward E. Hale Jr. Professor of English at Union College where he teaches creative writing and poetry.

== Bibliography ==
=== Poetry collections ===
- An Apology for Loving the Old Hymns, Princeton University Press, 1982.
- Lucky Seven, Wesleyan University Press, 1988.
- The Household of Continuance, Copper Beech, 1992.
- For Appearances, University of Tampa Press, 2002.
- The Names of Things Are Leaving, University of Tampa Press, 2006.
- The Light in the Film, University of Tampa Press, 2011.
- Clare's Empire, Hydroelectric, 2014.
- Little Black Train, 3 Mile Harbor.

=== Chapbooks ===
- Three Grange Halls, Swan Scythe, 2002.
- Greatest Hits, Pudding House, 2003.
- The Flute is Zero, Right Hand Pointing, 2006.
