= Glenn Goldberg =

American painter (born 1953)

- Born: 1953 (age 72–73); Bronx, New York, U.S.
- Education: Queens College (B.A., M.F.A.)
- Known for: Painting, works on paper
- Movement: Contemporary art, abstraction
- Website: Official website

Glenn Goldberg (born 1953) is an American painter based in New York City. Goldberg was born in 1953 in the Bronx, New York. He earned a B.A. and M.F.A. in art from Queens College, City University of New York. Goldberg teaches at Queens College.

== Awards and honors ==
- 1984: Edward Albee Foundation Residency
- 1988: Guggenheim Fellowship

== Collections ==
Goldberg's work is the collections of the Metropolitan Museum of Art, the Brooklyn Museum and the Nelson-Atkins Museum of Art.
