= Miguel Navarro Cañizares =

Spanish painter

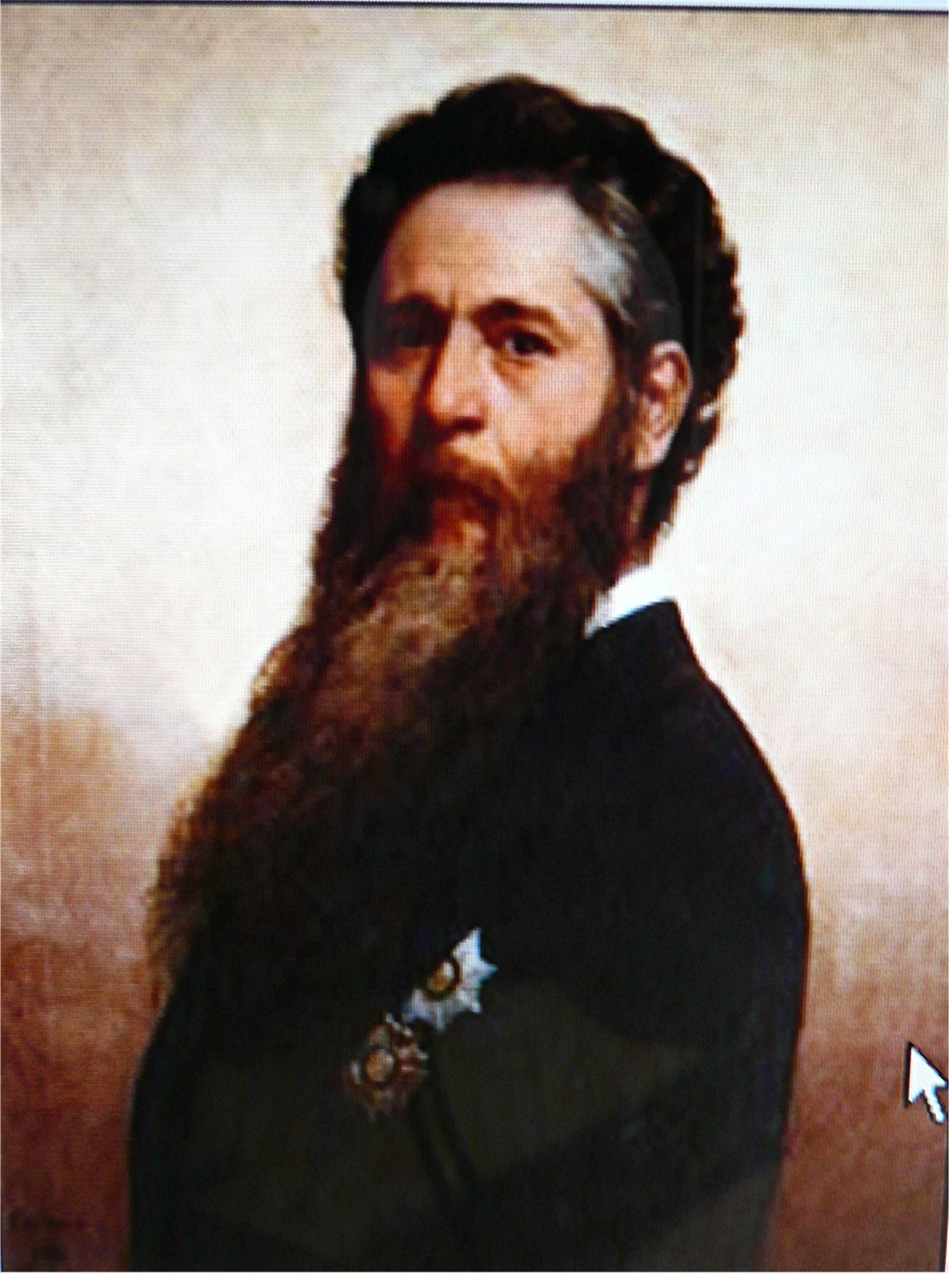
- Miguel Navarro Cañizares, Self-portrait, 1886
- Born: c. 1835; Valencia, Spain
- Died: 23 October 1913; Rio de Janeiro
- Education: Academy of Fine Arts, Valencia; San Fernando Academy, Madrid
- Movement: Orientalist

Miguel Navarro Cañizares (c. 1835 – 23 October 1913) was a Spanish painter and art teacher who worked in Venezuela and Brazil.

== Biography ==
He was born to a basket maker in Valencia and attended the Academy of Fine Arts. Later, he moved to Madrid, where he took classes at the San Fernando Academy and found a position in the workshop of Federico de Madrazo. In 1861, he entered a competition to fill a teaching vacancy at the "Escuela superior de Pintura, Escultura y Grabado", but was not successful.

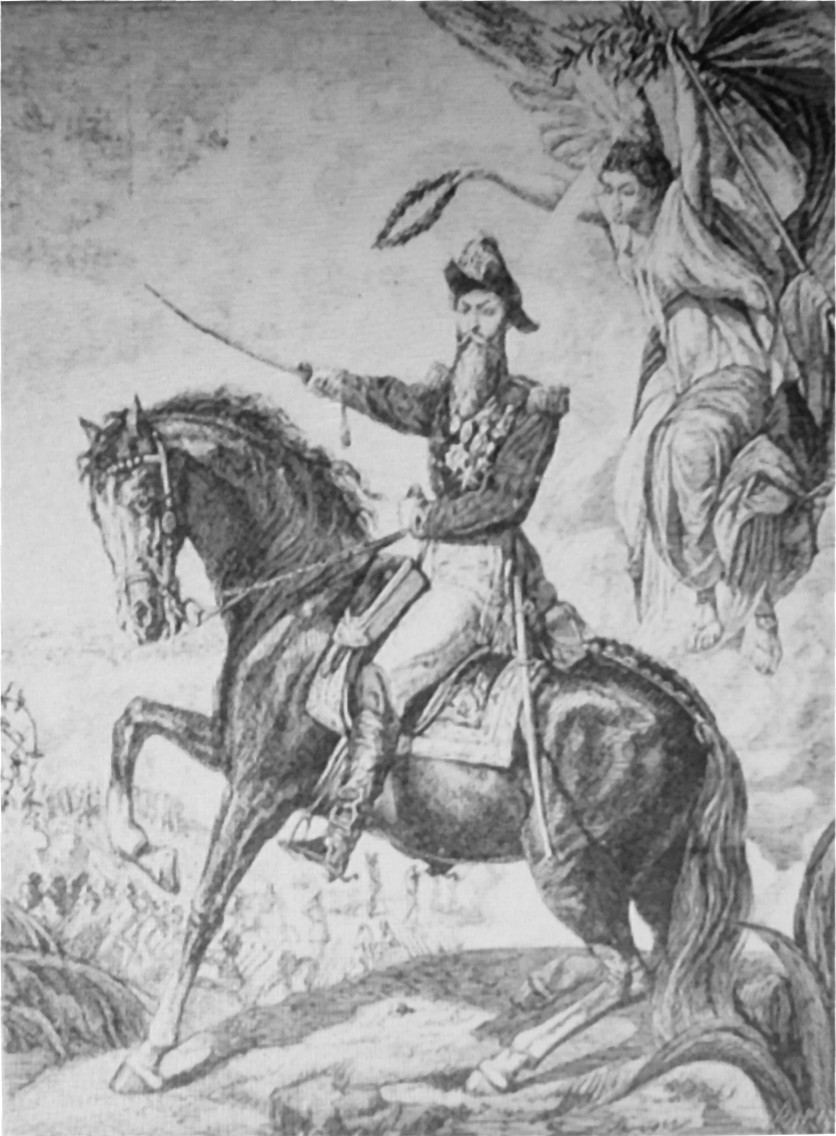
Lithograph copy of the "Battle of Apure" (1873)

For several years, he participated in the National Exhibition of Fine Arts, where his painting of Saint Catherine being transported by angels won a gold medal. His canvas depicting Agustina de Aragón was distributed as a lithograph and used to illustrate a novel. In 1864, he won a grant to study in Rome for his version of the Raising of Jairus' daughter.

Later, in 1871, the Archbishop of Caracas, Silvestre Guevara y Lira, who was attending the First Vatican Council, saw some of Navarro's paintings and invited him to execute murals in the Caracas Cathedral; a project that would never be realized.

Navarro arrived in Venezuela in 1872, shortly after President Antonio Guzmán Blanco had consolidated his rule at the Battle of San Fernando de Apure. The editor of La Opinión Nacional, a pro-government daily, suggested that the newly arrived (and politically neutral) Navarro would be the perfect choice to immortalize the event. The huge painting hung in the Senate chambers at the Palacio Federal Legislativo until 1889, when it disappeared; probably destroyed by opponents of the former President who vandalized statues and portraits of him throughout the country.

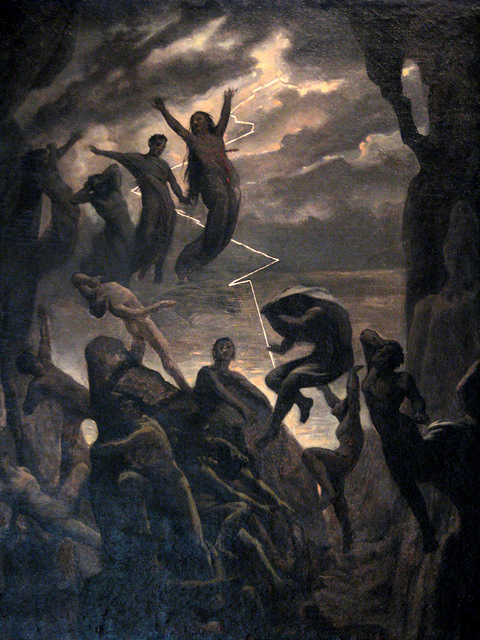
Regret (1887)

=== His career in Brazil ===
In 1876, Archbishop Guevara was removed from office and went into exile. Bereft of patronage (and possibly no longer welcome), Navarro resigned his teaching position at the Academy of Fine Arts and departed for Rio de Janeiro with his wife and children. However, an epidemic of yellow fever there made him stop in Salvador. Soon, he found a position teaching at the "Escola de Artes e Ofícios da Bahia", but was dismissed a year later due to serious disagreements with the school's Director, José Antonio da Cunha Couto (1832-1894). As a result, Navarro and some friends decided to create a separate art academy. With the support of the Baron de Lucena and the state government, the school opened just before Christmas that same year.

Although the school was successful, Navarro could not maintain a sufficient income from the limited local demand for art so, after five years, he relocated to Rio de Janeiro, where he worked primarily as a portrait painter. His patrons there included the Royal family. He remained there until his death. A street in the Pituba district of Salvador is named after him.
