= Marilú Mallet =

Chilean film essayist (born 1944)

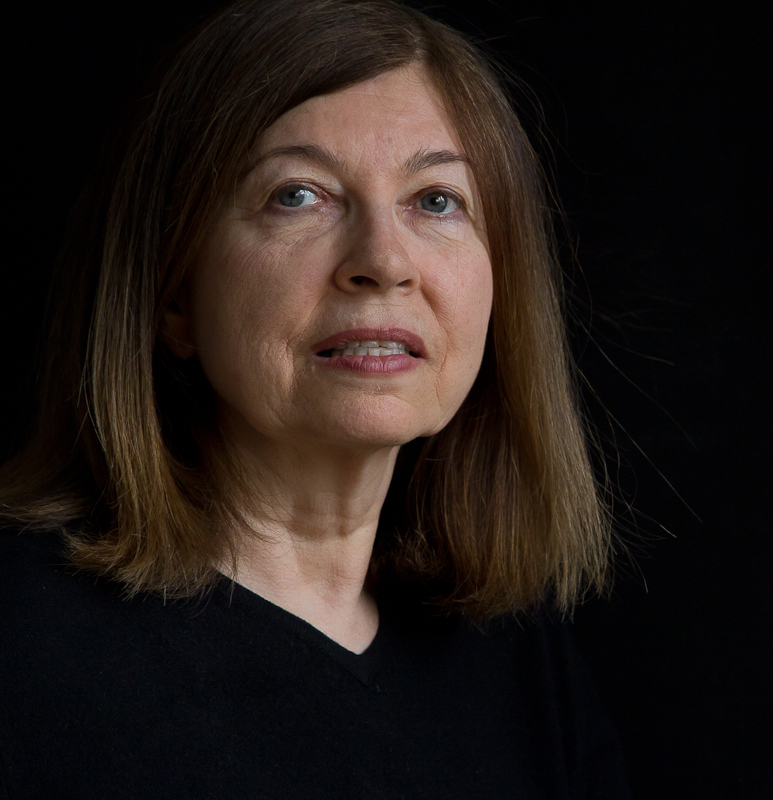
- Marilú Mallet en 2014
- Born: 2 December 1944
- Alma mater: University of Chile; Université de Montréal
- Parent(s): Armando Mallet; María Luisa Señoret
- Awards: Guggenheim Fellowship (1988)

Marilú Mallet (born 1944) is a Chilean-Canadian film essayist who was exiled to Canada in the 1970s. Like Angelina Vásquez in Finland and Valeria Sarmiento in France, she is notable as one of the first Chilean women film directors, producing much of her work in exile.

== Filmography ==
- Il n'y a pas d'oubli (1975)
- Journal inachevé (1982)
- Mémoires d'une enfant des Andes (1985)
- Doble retrato (2000)
- La cueca sola (2003)

== Bibliography ==
- Elizabeth Ramírez and Catalina Donoso (eds.) Nomadías. El cine de Marilú Mallet, Valeria Sarmiento y Angelina Vásquez (Ediciones Metales Pesados, 2016) ISBN 9568415882, ISBN 9789568415884
