= James P. White (writer) =

Executive director of the Christopher Isherwood Foundation

James Patrick White (born 1940 in Wichita Falls, Texas) is the former executive director of the Christopher Isherwood Foundation and has published five books of fiction as well as stories, poems, and articles. He has edited a number of literary collections. White has received Guggenheim and other fellowships and has taught at UCLA, the University of Southern California, and the University of South Alabama. He was the founding president of the Gulf Coast Association of Creative Writing Teachers and the Texas Association of Creative Writing Teachers.

White was founding president of the Gulf Coast Association of Creative Writing Teachers, the Texas Association of Creative Teachers, and was one of the founders of the American Literary Translators Association and founding editor of the Translation Review.

== Life ==
White was born in Wichita Falls, Texas, and lived in Arlington, Texas. He was educated at the University of Texas at Austin, Vanderbilt University and Brown University. He taught Creative Writing and directed the graduate program at the University of Southern California and The University of South Alabama. He also taught at UCLA and at the University of Texas at Dallas and at The University of Texas, Permian Basin.

== Awards ==
- Guggenheim Fellowship
- Alabama Literary Award

== Select bibliography ==
=== Books ===
- Dreams of A Mexican: 27 Years Illegal
- Observations Without Daddy (TCWP) (2013)
- The Persian Oven (Methuen)
- California Exit (Methuen)
- Birdsong (Methuen) First edition by Copper Beech Press, c1977.
- The 9th Car (Putnam's)
- I am Everyone I Meet (TCWP)
- Talking About Ideas with Your Children
- Clara's Call
- Chris and Me. A memoir About a Friendschip [with Christopher Isherwood}.

=== Edited books ===
- Where Joy Resides, A Christopher Isherwood Reader (Farrar Straus)
- Black Alabama (Texas Center for Writers Press)

=== Film ===
- Chris and Don, 2008, Zeitgeist distributors (Producer and Executive Producer)
