= Jorge Tacla Sacaán =

Chilean visual artist

- Born: 1958 (age 67–68); Santiago de Chile, Chile
- Known for: Painter, installation art
- Website: www.jorgetacla.com

Jorge Tacla is a Chilean-born visual artist. He studied at the Escuela de Bellas Artes, Universidad de Chile in Santiago and moved to New York City in 1981.

Well known for his paintings and drawings, he also works with other media such as photography, video, performance and installation. Tacla works between New York and Santiago, Chile.

In 2019 the Smithsonian's Archives of American Art incorporated Tacla's papers into their archive. These papers include some of his drawings, correspondence, photographs, notebooks, and clippings.

== Biography ==
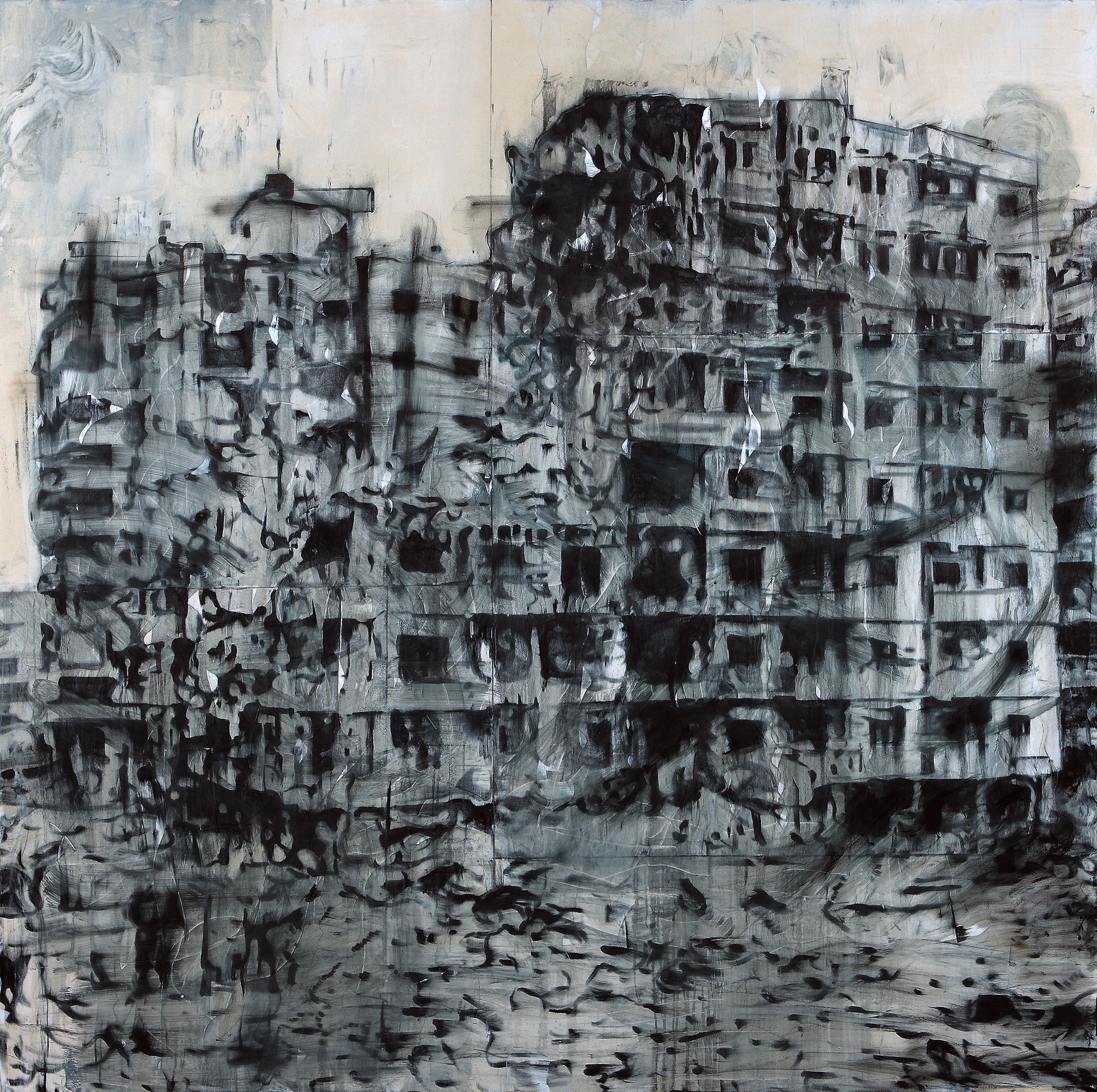
Identidad Oculta 40, 2013, Oil and cold wax on canvas, 100 x 100 in 250 x 250 cm

Tacla was born in 1958 in Santiago, Chile. Tacla received music studies in piano and percussion during his childhood. Later, he studied painting with Rodolfo Opazo and Gonzalo Díaz at Universidad de Chile between 1976 and 1979.

In 1981 he moved to New York. Besides his artistic work, Tacla is also the co-founder and artistic director of a production company, was co-founder and adjunct artistic director of the Santiago International Film Festival (2006–2013) and was director of the film department at CORPARTES (2005–2013).

== Exhibitions ==
Tacla's work has been exhibited at Sharjah Art Foundation, Sharjah; Coral Gables Museum, Miami; Converge 45 2023 Biennial, Portland; MoMa PS1, NY; Seibu Artforum, Tokyo; Museum of Contemporary Hispanic Art, NY; National Museum of Contemporary Art, Seoul; High Museum of Art, Atlanta; Dublin Contemporary 2011, Dublin; 798 Biennale, Beijing; The Bronx Museum, NY; Milwaukee Art Museum, MI; Museo Nacional de Bellas Artes, Santiago; Museo Nacional de Bellas Artes, Buenos Aires; Sharjah Biennale 10, Sharjah; 55 Venice Biennale, Venice; Museo de la Memoria y los Derechos Humanos, Santiago; Art Museum of the Americas, Washington DC.; California Center for the Arts, CA; MALBA, Buenos Aires; IV Bienal de Cuenca, Cuenca, Ecuador.

In 2012, his work was paired with Li Taihuan's at the Bruce Museum's exhibition "Tales of Two Cities: New York & Beijing", where each addressed the theme of urban decay.

== Selected public commissions ==
- 2010 Museo de la Memoria, "Al Mismo Tiempo, en el Mismo Lugar," Santiago, Chile
- 2004 Edificio el Regidor, "San Santiago," Santiago, Chile
- 1990 Bronx Housing Court, "Memories of the Bronx," Percent for Art Commission, Bronx, New York
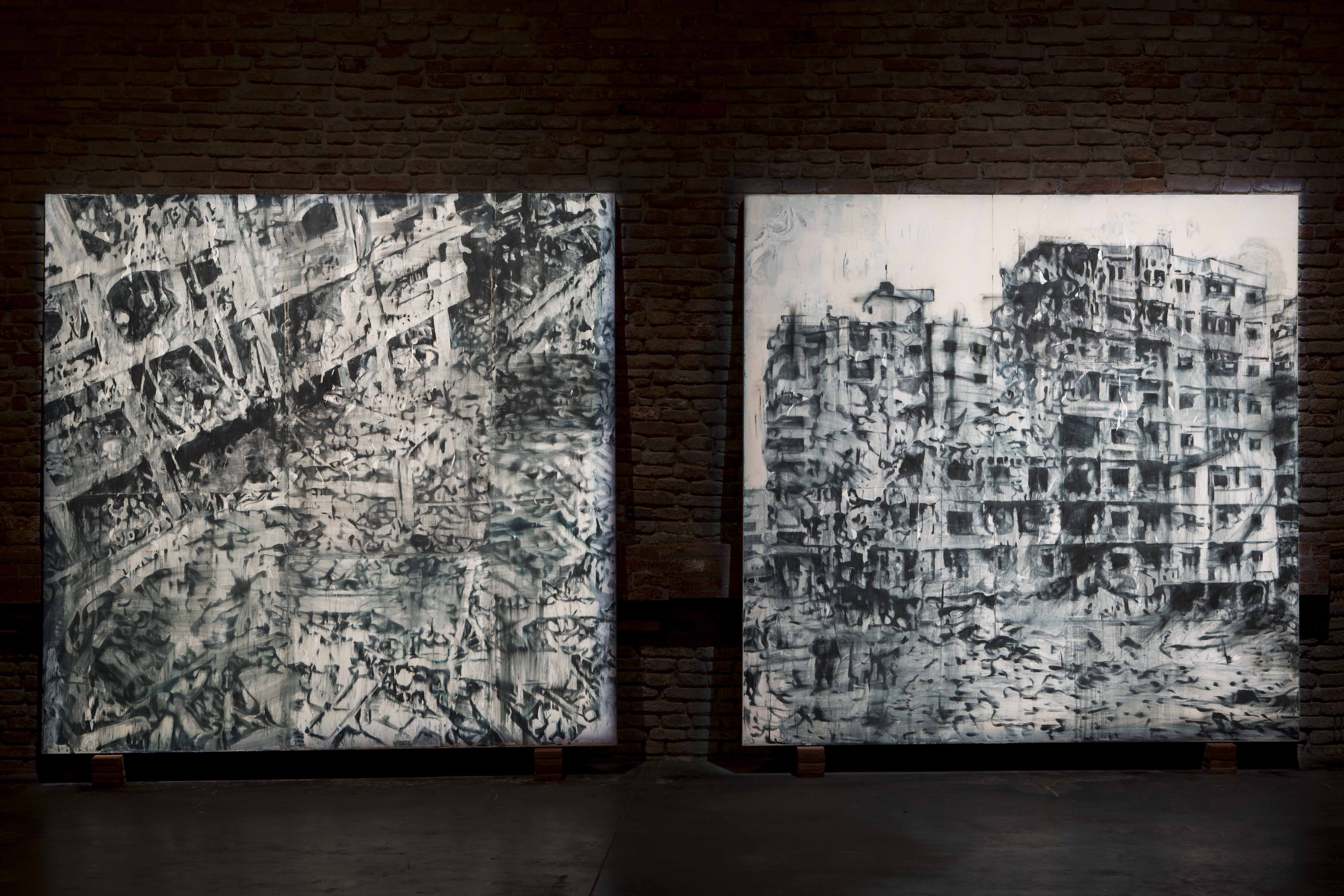
  55 Venice Biennale, Emergency Pavilion, 2013

== Awards ==
- 2013 Rockefeller Foundation Bellagio Center in Bellagio, Italy
- 1992 Eco Art Award, Brazil
- 1991 New York Foundation for the Arts, USA
- 1987 New York Foundation for the Arts, USA
- 1988 John Simon Guggenheim Memorial Foundation Fellowship, USA
- 1986 AT&T Foundation, USA
- 1981–82 Grant "Corporación Amigos del Arte" Santiago, Chile

== General references ==
- San Martin, Florencia (2021). The Jorge Tacla Archives. Santiago: Ediciones de Arrabal.
- Yau, John; Pietropaolo, Francesca; Zamudio, Raúl; Vine, Richard; Cameron, Dan; Kuspit, Donald; Viveros-Fauné, Christian; San Martín, Florencia (2017). Jorge Tacla: Señal de Abandono. Santiago: Metales Pesados. ISBN 9569843012
- Eltit, Diamela; Viveros-Fauné, Christian (2017). J orge Tacla: Todo lo sólido se desvanece. Santiago: CORPARTES. ISBN 956-9123-07-9
- Tacla, Jorge (2014). Identidades ocultas = Hidden identities. Santiago: Museo de la Memoria y los Derechos Humanos. ISBN 978-956-9144-17-2. OCLC 925504764.
- Tacla, Jorge (2008). Jorge Tacla : Pinturas/Paintings (in Spanish). Donald Burton Kuspit, Raúl. Zamudio. [Santiago, Chile]: Quebecor. ISBN 978-956-319-523-1. OCLC 904543106.
- Przybilla, Carrie (1991). Art at the Edge: Jorge Tacla. High Museum of Art. ISBN 978-0-939802-71-5.
- Rubey, Dan (1992). Jorge Tacla: Memory of Place. Exh. cat. New York: Lehman College Art Gallery.
- Kuspit, Donald; Przybilla, Carrie; Ruzicka, Joseph (1997). Jorge Tacla: Drawings. Exh. cat. Milwaukee: Milwaukee Art Museum ISBN 0965863700
