= Jonathan Beecher =

American historian

Jonathan French Beecher (born 1937) is a historian who has taught at the University of California, Santa Cruz since the early 1970s. He specializes in French history and European intellectual history, including Russian. He received his B.A. and his Ph.D. from Harvard University and also was a student at the Ecole Normale Supérieure in Paris for two years.

He authored biographies on the utopian socialist Charles Fourier and his successor and proponent Victor Prosper Considerant.

== References and sources ==
Sources

- Lagarde, François (2003). French in Texas. Austin, Texas: University of Texas Press. pp. 321. ISBN 0-292-70528-X.
