= List of California State University, Fullerton people =

The following is a list of notable people associated with California State University, Fullerton.

== Students ==
Name	Known for	Relationship to Fullerton
Omid Abtahi	actor	B.A. in communications-advertising, 2002
Khalil Ahmad	athletics; basketball player in the Israeli Basketball Premier League	
Josh Akognon	athletics; basketball player	
Damon Allen	athletics; football player	
Nicholas Arciniaga	athletics; long-distance runner	graduated 2006
Tanner Bibee	athletics; baseball player (Cleveland Guardians)	
James Blaylock	author	M.A. in English, 1974
Bruce Bowen	athletics; basketball player	B.A. in communications, 2006
Bobby Brown	athletics; basketball player	majored in communications
Gerald Brown	athletics; basketball player	
Christine Marie Cabanos	actor	
Rubén Carbajal	actor (Hamilton)	B.F.A. in theatre arts, 2015
David Castañeda	actor (The Umbrella Academy)	B.A. in communications-radio/TV/film, 2015
Charles Castronovo	musician; tenor opera singer	studied music, 1993–1995
Cedric Ceballos	athletics; basketball player	
Matt Chapman	athletics; baseball player (San Francisco Giants)	graduated 2015
Phillip Chen	politician; California State Assembly	
Marc Cherry	screenwriter and producer; creator of Desperate Housewives	B.A. in theatre arts, 1995
Roy Choi	chef	B.A. in philosophy
Sherry Cola	actress and comedian	
Mark Collins	athletics; football player	
Chad Cordero	athletics; baseball player	
Lou Correa	politician; United States House of Representatives	B.A. in economics, 1980
Shane Costa	athletics; baseball player	did not graduate
Kevin Costner	actor and filmmaker	B.A. in business, 1978
Valorie Curry	actress	B.A. in theatre arts, 2008
Mara Davi	actress (A Chorus Line, The Drowsy Chaperone)	
J. D. Davis	athletics: third baseman for the San Francisco Giants	
Khris Davis	athletics; baseball player	
Richard K. Davis	business; former chairman of U.S. Bancorp	B.A. in economics, 1983
Joey DiGiamarino	athletics; soccer player	
T.J. Dillashaw	athletics; mixed martial artist	
Stewart Donaldson	author, psychologist, evaluation research scientist	M.A. in experimental psychology, 1987
Brian Dunseth	athletics; soccer player	
Tracy Caldwell Dyson	NASA astronaut	B.S. in chemistry, 1993
Berlin Edmond	YouTuber	B.A. in English, 2017
Linda Emond	actress	B.A. in theatre arts, 1982
Rizwan Farook	criminal; 2015 San Bernardino attack	
Danielle Fishel	actress (Boy Meets World)	B.A. in psychology, 2012
Courtney Force	athletics; drag racer	B.A. in communications
Joe Franchino	athletics; soccer player	
Dustin Garneau	athletics; baseball player	
Grant Geissman	musician	did not graduate
Elizabeth George	author	
Todd Gerhart	athletics; football player	1981–1984
Jeremy Giambi	athletics; baseball player	
Rod Gilfry	musician; baritone opera singer	B.A. in music education
Mary Gray-Reeves	Episcopal bishop	B.A. in history, 1987
Mike Harkey	athletics; baseball player	
Dan Henderson	athletics; Olympic wrestler and mixed martial artist; former Pride/UFC champion	
Robin Holmes-Sullivan	academia; psychologist, president of Lewis & Clark College	B.A. in psychology, 1986; M.A. in psychology, 1988
Ashley Force Hood	athletics; drag racer	B.A. in communications, 2003
K. W. Jeter	author	B.A. in sociology, 1973
Reed Johnson	athletics; baseball player	
Ross Johnson	politician	
Kato Kaelin	actor (witness in the O. J. Simpson murder case)	
Tony Kanal	musician; bassist of No Doubt	
Gabe Kapler	athletics; baseball player, and manager (San Francisco Giants)	did not graduate
Bobby Kemp	athletics; football player	
Kozue and Dan Kitchens (a.k.a. Kozyndan)	artist and illustrator team	B.F.A. in illustration, 2002
Mark Kostabi	artist	B.A. in drawing and painting
Mark Kotsay	athletics; baseball player	
Kim Krizan	screenwriter (Before Sunset)	
Mike Lamb	athletics; baseball player	
Adam Lambert	musician; lead singer for Queen + Adam Lambert	did not graduate
Giovanni Lanaro	athletics; Olympian track and field; pole vaulter; 2004 Athens, 2008 Beijing	graduated in 2004
Matthew Libatique	cinematographer	
Bentley Little	author	
Rene Liu	musician and actress	B.A. in music
Matthew Lopez	athletics; mixed martial artist	
Michael Lorenzen	athletics; baseball player (Los Angeles Angels)	
Elita Loresca	television meteorologist (KNBC)	B.A. in broadcast journalism
Danella Lucioni	model	B.A. in communications-radio/TV/film, 2007
Carl Macek	screenwriter and producer (Robotech)	
Steve Mariucci	athletics; football coach	
Antonio Martínez	athletics; soccer player	
Joe A. Martinez	UFC, MMA, boxing ring announcer	B.A. in broadcast journalism, 1999
James D. McCaffrey	software researcher and writer	B.A. in mathematics
José Mota	athletics; baseball player, broadcaster	
Patrick Nagel	artist and illustrator	
Phil Nevin	athletics; baseball player	
Chris Norby	politician; California State Assembly	M.A. in history, 1989
Jack O'Connell	politician; California state superintendent of Public Instruction	B.A. in history
Yuji Okumoto	actor	B.A. in theater arts
Duncan Oughton	athletics; soccer player	did not graduate
Jessica Penne	athletics; mixed martial artist	B.A. in communications
Mike Penner	sportswriter	
Walter Perez	actor	B.S. in criminal justice
Vinnie Pestano	athletics; baseball player	
Ann Phong	artist	M.F.A. in painting, 1995
Brett Pill	athletics; baseball player	
Allen Pitts	athletics; football player	
Frank Pooler	composer	
Marie Pooler	composer	
Cynthia J. Popp	television director and producer	B.A. in communications-radio/TV/film, 1984
Monique Powell	musician; lead singer of Save Ferris	
Tim Powers	author	
Mike Pringle	athletics; football player	
Bao Quach	athletics; wrestler; mixed martial artist	B.S. in kinesiology
Sharon Quirk-Silva	politician; California State Assembly	
Tom Ranier	musician	B.A. in music composition, 1972
Tony Reagins	athletics; general manager, Los Angeles Angels of Anaheim	B.A. in marketing, 1991
Anthony Rendon	politician; speaker of the California State Assembly	B.A. and M.A. in political science, 1992 and 1994
Jessica Rey	actress and fashion designer	B.A. in business, 2000
Mitrice Richardson	crime victim	B.A. in psychology in 2008
Jeremy Riddle	musician; Bethel Music	B.A. in political science
Greg Robinson	athletics; football coach	
Ricky Romero	athletics; baseball player	
Terry Rossio	screenwriter	B.A. in communications, 1984
Mike Rouse	athletics; baseball player	
Aaron Rowand	athletics; baseball player	
Edward R. Royce	politician; United States House of Representatives	B.A. in accounting and finance, 1977
Michele Ruiz	journalist	
Kirk Saarloos	athletics; baseball player	did not graduate
Vida Samadzai	model; 2003 Miss Afghanistan	
Josh Saunders	athletics; soccer player	
Judson Scott	actor	
D. J. Seeley	athletics; basketball player	
Michael Shermer	author and founder, The Skeptics Society	M.A. in psychology, 1978
Eddie Soto	athletics; soccer player	
Pape Sow	athletics; basketball player	
Shay Spitz	athletics; soccer player	
Gwen Stefani	musician; lead singer of No Doubt	did not graduate
Marc Stein	sportswriter	B.A. in communications/journalism, 1991
Nadya Suleman	media; mother of Suleman octuplets	B.S. in child development
Kurt Suzuki	athletics; baseball player	
Jesse Taylor	athletics; mixed martial artist	
Josh Robert Thompson	actor and comedian (Geoff Peterson from The Late Late Show with Craig Ferguson)	
Brianne Tju	actress	
Darin Toohey	professor; atmospheric and oceanic sciences	B.S. in chemistry, B.A. in physics
Jenny Topping	athletics; softball player	
Justin Turner	athletics; baseball player	
Kirsten Vangsness	actress (Criminal Minds)	B.A. in theatre arts, 1996
Kwame Vaughn	athletics; basketball player (Israeli Basketball National League)	
Deborah Voigt	musician; soprano opera singer	
Tim Wallach	athletics; baseball player	
Brent Whitfield	athletics; soccer player	
Jason Windsor	athletics; baseball player	
Leon Wood	athletics; basketball player, NBA referee	
Linda Woolverton	screenwriter (Beauty and the Beast)	M.A. in theatre arts, 1979

- Jackson Rowe (kinesiology 2020), Israeli Basketball Premier League player

== Faculty ==
Name	Known for	Relationship to CSU Fullerton
Joel K Abraham	ecologist	associate professor
Alfie Agnew	composer, songwriter, musician	professor of Mathematics
Jeremy Beck	composer	associate professor of Music (1999–2002)
Michael H. Birnbaum	mathematical psychologist	professor of Psychology and director, Decision Research Center
Edward Castronova	research on the economies of synthetic worlds	associate professor of Telecommunications
John R. Clymer	systems engineering expert	professor of Electrical Engineering, emeritus
Christina Cogdell	art historian	assistant professor of Liberal Studies (2001–2004)
Daniel R. Crary	bluegrass guitarist	professor of Speech Communication, emeritus
William Cunliffe	jazz pianist and composer	associate professor of Music
Lawrence B. de Graaf	historian	professor of History
Eduardo Delgado	pianist	professor of Music
Edwin Duerr	director	professor of Theater, emeritus
Svetlana Efremova	actress, head of acting program	professor of Theatre
Robert Engels	writer, producer and director	assistant professor of Radio-TV-Film
Judi Garman	women's softball coach	coach (1980–1999)
Ananda W.P. Guruge	Buddhism expert	adjunct professor of Religious Studies
Richard Hellesen	author and playwright	professor of Theatre Arts
Gregory Ivy	artist	professor of Art (1965–1971)
Fred M. Johnson	physicist	professor of physics
Fred Katz	cellist and composer	professor of Ethnic Music
David Keirsey	author and psychologist	professor emeritus of Psychology
Mary M. Lepper	political scientist and public administration scholar	professor of Political Science
Paul Martin Lester	author and photojournalist	professor of Communications
Willis E. McNelly	science-fiction scholar	professor of English, Emeritus
Billie Moore	first US Olympic women's basketball coach (1976)	women's basketball coach and athletic director (1969–77)
Kye Palmer	trumpeter	instructor in Music
Anthony Rendon	politician; speaker of the California State Assembly	professor of Political Science and Criminal Justice
Håkan O. Rosengren	clarinetist	professor of Music
David M. Sandner	fantasy and science-fiction writer	associate professor of English, Comparative Literature and Linguistics
Nancy L. Segal	psychologist, twin researcher	professor of Psychology, and Director, Twin Studies Center
Jule Selbo	screenwriter	professor of Screenwriting
Muzammil Siddiqi	Islamic studies	adjunct professor of Comparative Religion
Nancy Snow	author, speaker	professor of Communications, emeritus
Raphael Sonenshein	author and race relations	professor of Political Science
Bogdan Suceava	mathematician, fiction writer	professor of Mathematics
Lara Teeter	actor and theatre director	associate professor in Theatre and Dance
Emory Tolbert	historian	professor of History, 1984–1991
Otto von Sadovszky	linguistic anthropologist	professor of Anthropology, emeritus

== University presidents ==
Name	Years served
Dr. William B. Langsdorf	1957–1971
Dr. L. Donald Shields	1971–1980
Dr. Miles D. McCarthy	1981
Dr. Jewel Plummer Cobb	1981–1989
Dr. Milton A. Gordon	1990–2012
Dr. Willie J. Hagan (interim)	January 9, 2012–June 10, 2012
Dr. Mildred García	2012–2017
Dr. Fram Virjee	2017–2023
Dr. Sylvia Alva	2023–2024
Dr. Ronald S. Rochon	2024–present

== See also ==
- List of people from California
