= Darnell Hunt =

American sociologist and academic administrator (born 1962)

- Born: 1962 (age 63–64); Washington, D.C., U.S.
- Education: University of Southern California (BA); Georgetown University (MBA); University of California, Los Angeles (MA, PhD)
- Scientific career
- Fields: Sociology
- Institutions: University of California, Los Angeles
- Thesis: Fires on the Screen: Raced Ways of Seeing and Resistance (1994)

Darnell Montez Hunt (born 1962) is an American sociologist and academic administrator. He is a professor of sociology and African American studies at the University of California, Los Angeles and the former director of the Ralph J. Bunche Center for African American Studies. Hunt previously served as interim chancellor of UCLA from August to December 2024.

== Education ==
Hunt received a Bachelor of Arts with a major in journalism (public relations) from the University of Southern California in 1984 and a Master of Business Administration from Georgetown University in 1988. He received a Master of Arts in 1991 and a Doctor of Philosophy in 1994 in sociology from the University of California, Los Angeles.

== Career ==
He later became a full professor of Sociology and African American Studies. He was the chair of the Sociology department, and the director of the Ralph J. Bunche Center for African American Studies, where he was succeeded by history professor Kelly Lytle Hernandez. Since July 2017, Hunt has served as the dean of Social Sciences.

== Works ==
Hunt is the author of two books, and the editor of two more books. He has also published an annual report on the lack of diversity in the film industry since 2014. The 2017 report, which was commissioned by the Color of Change, a non-profit civil rights advocacy organization, showed that very few television writers were black. To increase their share, Hunt suggested television producers use the Rooney Rule during their interviewing process.

His first book, Screening the Los Angeles "Riots:" Race, Seeing and Resistance, looks at the way white, black and Hispanic television viewers understood the 1992 Los Angeles riots. In a review for Contemporary Sociology, professor S. Craig Watkins of the University of Texas at Austin called it "a highly original, insightful, and essential piece of research." However, in a review for the Revue française de sociologie, Julien Damon regretted that Hunt did not look at the way Koreans were impacted by the riots; he added that other axes of subjectivity than race like "age, sex, profession and income levels" would have made the analysis more comprehensive. His second book, O.J. Simpson Facts and Fictions: News Rituals in the Construction of Reality, is about the O. J. Simpson murder case.

Hunt subsequently edited two books. His third book, Channeling Blackness: Studies on Television and Race in America, was about the way blacks are portrayed on television. His fourth book, Black Los Angeles: American Dreams and Racial Realities, co-edited with Ana-Christina Ramón, the assistant director of the Ralph J. Bunche Center for African American Studies, is a collection of seventeen articles about South Los Angeles and Leimert Park. The Journal of American History published a mixed review by Lawrence B. de Graaf, a History professor at California State University, Fullerton. For de Graaf, "This book should be in any collection on recent African American life and on Los Angeles, but next to more comprehensive historical works." In particular, he criticized the lack of attention paid to blacks who live just outside Los Angeles, or to the black middle class. Reviewing it for The Journal of African American History, John H. Barnhill praised the book, writing "Scholarly excellence characterizes many of the articles." He concluded, "the volume provides a great deal of direction for those seeking to understand the background to and current state of the African American urban experience in the 21st century."

== Published works ==
- Hunt, Darnell M. (1997). Screening the Los Angeles "Riots:" Race, Seeing and Resistance. Cambridge, U.K.: Cambridge University Press. ISBN 9780521578141. OCLC 4769452437.
- Hunt, Darnell M. (1999). O.J. Simpson Facts and Fictions: News Rituals in the Construction of Reality. Cambridge, U.K.: Cambridge University Press. ISBN 9780521624688. OCLC 797427087.
- Hunt, Darnell M., ed. (2005). Channeling Blackness: Studies on Television and Race in America. New York: Oxford University Press. ISBN 9780195167634. OCLC 637394443.
- Hunt, Darnell M.; Ramón, Ana-Christina, eds. (2010). Black Los Angeles: American Dreams and Racial Realities. New York City: NYU Press. ISBN 9780814737347. OCLC 477268823.
