= William B. Langsdorf =

American university president (1909–2002)

- Born: August 23, 1909; Denver, Colorado
- Died: November 18, 2002 (aged 93)
- Education: Occidental College (B.A. & M.A.); University of California, Berkeley (Ph.D.)
- Known for: California State University, Fullerton (founding president)

William B. Langsdorf (October 23, 1909 – November 18, 2002) was the founding president of California State University, Fullerton (then known as Orange County State College).

== Background ==
William B. Langsdorf (1909-2002) was born in Denver, CO but grew up in Pasadena, CA. He completed his B.A. and M.A. degrees at Occidental College and his Ph.D. in history at the University of California, Berkeley. He taught history at Occidental for several years before becoming an administrator at Pasadena City College. He served as assistant principal at Pasadena City College from 1939 to 1950 and then as principal (president) from 1950 to 1959. At the time Langsdorf accepted the appointment as the first president of Orange County State College (January 19, 1959), the institution existed in name only. It had no campus, faculty, administration, or staff.

== Establishing Orange County State College ==
=== 1959-1965 ===
Langsdorf faced a number of challenges when he accepted the appointment as the first president of Orange County State College (later to become California State University, Fullerton). These included finding temporary quarters to house the administrative offices of the new college, as well as finding people to fill the administrative positions. Temporary quarters also had to be found to house the soon to be hired faculty, and the first classes to be offered by the college. A 228-acre tract of land in the northeast corner of the city of Fullerton had been identified for the permanent campus; however, title to various portions of the land was held by several different owners. It would take close to two years before the state could acquire all of this land for the campus.

Langsdorf was able to obtain the use of one floor of an old building owned by the local community college, Fullerton College, that had been moved to the campus of Fullerton High School to house the administrative offices. He also was able to obtain an agreement to use space at the recently opened Sunny Hills High School campus in north-west Fullerton to house faculty and classes until temporary buildings could be constructed at the permanent campus site.

Langsdorf quickly recruited an administrative staff that included Executive Dean Dr. Stuart McComb who had been Superintendent of the Pico Rivera School District, Dean of Instruction Dr. Gerhard Ehmann who had been president of Glendale Community College, Finance Officer Jack Lyons from the San Francisco State College Foundation, Dean of Students Dr. Earnest A. Becker from Pasadena City College, and Librarian Dr. Earnest Toy, Jr. from Riverside City College.

At the time the state colleges in California were under the nominal control of the California state department of education and the Superintendent of Public Instruction. However, in practice, the individual state colleges enjoyed a considerable degree of autonomy. This gave Langsdorf the opportunity to select the academic direction of the new college. Most of the existing state colleges had been established as teacher-training institutions, though by 1959 segments of the faculties at many of these colleges were pressing to widen their academic roles. By 1959 Orange County was changing rapidly. Housing tracts and new industry, including a number of high-technology industries, were springing up throughout the county as agricultural land was sold off to developers. Langsdorf recognized that the new college would need to offer more than teacher education if it was to serve the needs of its service area.

Teacher education would be a significant part of the mission of Orange County State College, but only a part of its mission. The founding faculty members hired by Langsdorf to head the divisions of the new college represented a broad range of academic disciplines. They included Seth Fessenden (Speech), E.C. Newsom, Miles D. McCarthy (Science), Lawrence B. de Graaf (History), Lester Beals, Barbara Hartsig (Education), and William Alamshah (Philosophy) along with Librarian Toy. The liberal arts thus became a key component in the education of all students in the new college regardless of their individual degree interests.

With the initial administrators and faculty members in place along with a five-person clerical staff, Orange County State College opened its doors to 452 students at Sunny Hills High School on September 21, 1959, nine months after Langsdorf became president. At the same time planning began for the growth of the student body and the development of the permanent campus. Langsdorf organized all of his administrators and faculty members into a Faculty Council to advise him on these issues. He delegated to the Faculty Council significant responsibility for the development of academic policy for the new college, as well as seeking their advice regarding the physical development of the new campus. Though a few other California state colleges had academic senates at this time, this level of collegial governance was unique among the state colleges.

When the California State College System was established following the development of the Master Plan for Higher Education in California in 1961, both the requirement that all students complete a core general education program firmly based in the liberal arts and the principle of collegial governance in the development of academic policies that were pioneered by Langsdorf at Fullerton became system-wide cornerstones.

Construction began on 12 temporary buildings on the permanent campus site in March 1960. These were ready for occupancy by the Fall 1960 semester. At the time state funds for permanent buildings were driven by formulas based on FTES (full-time equivalent students). State planners projected that enrollment at the Fullerton campus eventually would reach approximately 35,000 FTES, so Langsdorf and his staff were faced with the challenge of creating facilities on the 238-acre site that would be able to accommodate that level of enrollment. Their solution was to delay completion of the first permanent building for four years, so that the new college's enrollment could grow. In addition, though the building was intended to eventually house the mathematics and science programs, it was designed in such a way that it initially could house almost all the academic programs of the college. The resulting structure, the Letters and Science Building (later renamed McCarthy Hall), which opened in the Fall of 1963 was a six-story building with a full basement with a total of about 300,000 sq. ft. of floor space. The next two permanent buildings built were the Music-Speech-Drama Building, which was completed in December 1964, and the Physical Education Building opened in September 1965. Langsdorf and his staff selected these for construction before other buildings on the campus master plan, because the state formulas were more generous for buildings that housed these activities.

=== 1966-1970 ===
The period from 1959-65 was marked by a high level of cooperation between Langsdorf and his administrators and faculty members, relatively strong support from state agencies, budgets that were sufficient to fund the new construction and additional faculty positions needed to keep up with a rapidly growing campus. The number of students had grown from 466 at the opening of classes in 1959 to 4,971 during the 1964–65 academic year. The corresponding FTES had grown from 180 to 3149 during the same period.

The second half of Langsdorf tenure as president presented much more severe challenges. The faculty was becoming more numerous and more diverse. The "old guard" faculty members viewed the college as primarily a teaching institution, while the "new turks" wanted more attention paid to research and scholarship in retention, tenure, and promotion decisions. This led to some contentious Faculty Council elections. State college faculty also were becoming concerned about compensation and working conditions, and the issue of collective bargaining was raised on many campuses including Fullerton.

In addition, state budget problems began to affect funding for the state colleges. These problems were felt most severely on campuses like Fullerton that were experiencing rapid growth in enrollment. The Fullerton campus was adding about 1000 FTES each year from 1966 through 1970. As a result, Langsdorf and his administrators were under pressure to keep the campus building plan on schedule, and to continue to add new members to the faculty. This pressure increased when Ronald Reagan took over as governor in 1967. Reagan proposed reducing the budget for the state colleges and for cutting faculty salaries to cope with the state budget problems. Nevertheless, Langsdorf and his staff were able to complete a number of building projects. The campus library was opened in 1966, the campus Commons opened in 1967, the Humanities and Social Science Building was completed in 1969, and the art building was completed in 1969. In addition construction was begun on the Engineering complex and on a building to house campus administrative offices and the School of Business Administration and Economics.

Parking also was a major problem on the largely commuter campus. There were fewer than 4,000 parking spaces to accommodate the 1967 enrollment of 10,750 students. This problem was relieved substantially when the system Board of Trustees began issuing revenue bonds to fund parking facilities on the campuses. Parking fees for students, staff, and faculty were used to pay off these bonds.

National events also were becoming much more turbulent with issues related to the counterculture, civil rights, the draft, and the Vietnam War coming to the forefront at this time. Unrest related to these issues affected many college and university campuses across the country during the second half of the decade. However, the Fullerton campus did not feel the full force of this trend until nearly the end of the decade.

Nevertheless, Langsdorf and his administration had to cope with these issues. The student population on the campus was overwhelmingly white at this time. In 1967 there were only five black students enrolled, and the numbers of Native American, Asian-American, and Hispanic students also were very small. Following the assassination of Martin Luther King Jr. in April 1968, the campus established a program to recruit and support more minority students. Langsdorf obtained funds to hire a director for this "New Education Horizons" program, which in 1969 became part of a state-funded equal opportunity program (EOP).

The first major incident that attracted significant public attention - and a State Senate investigation - was a student production of Michael McClure's allegedly pornographic play, The Beard, which was staged on campus during the fall semester of 1967. State Senators James E. Whetmore (R. Fulleron) and John G. Schmitz (R. Tustin) criticized Langsdorf for approving tenure for Professor Edwin Duerr, who allowed students in one of his classes to stage the play. Later Republicans in the State Senate attempted to force the firing of Duerr and to withhold funding from the state college system, but their bills failed in the Assembly. This incident forced Langsdorf to defend academic freedom in the college.

In the late sixties chapters of Students for a Democratic Society (SDS) and the Student Mobilization Committee to End the War in Vietnam (SMC) were formed on the campus. However, the Fullerton campus did not experience any major disturbances until the spring semester of 1970. At the invitation of the campus, Governor Ronald Reagan gave his first speech on a public college campus at Fullerton on February 9, 1970. This appearance drew a substantial number of protestors to the campus, and Reagan's speech was interrupted several times by hecklers. Arrest warrants for disturbing the peace were issued for two of the hecklers, Bruce Church and Dave MacKowiak, who coincidentally were leaders of SDS and SMC. This led to a sit-in by several hundred students in the Letters and Science Building on February 25, 1970, who demanded that the campus drop its disciplinary proceedings against the two arrested students. Police cleared the students from building and relative calm returned to the campus until March 3, 1970, when a major disturbance took place in the campus quad when protestors interrupted campus disciplinary hearings for Church and MacKowiak. Approximately 90 police officers responded to a request for assistance from acting president L. Donald Shields. At the time, Langsdorf was with his wife who was undergoing surgery at UCLA hospital. Police arrested 19 students and cleared the Quad. Eventually the number of students arrested either for heckling Reagan or for participating in the March 3rd confrontation with police totaled 37.

Students held daily meetings on the Quad and posted banners around the campus following the March 3rd confrontation. However, there were no major incidents or disruption of campus activities until late April when students began selling a book of pictures of the earlier confrontation on campus. The inside of the dust jacket for the book showed a graphic picture of several people protesting in the nude. This led to further arrests., and to the occupation of the Performing Arts Building by a group that included both anti-war activists and members of the counter-culture. The occupation was tolerated by the administration for a week. Then the administration ordered the removal of this group of protesters. It was found that this group included many individuals who were under the influence of drugs, and that significant damage to door locks and musical instruments had taken place. This was the last major campus disruption. At the time L. Donald Shields was acting president. Langsdorf was under doctor's orders to rest because the strain of campus events was affecting his health.

Shortly thereafter Langsdorf resigned as campus president, and became Vice Chancellor for Adademic Affairs at the California State College Chancellor's Office in Long Beach.

== Later years ==
Langsdorf served as president of Cal State Fullerton from 1959 to 1970 when he transferred to the Cal State System's Chancellor's Office in Long Beach and became Vice Chancellor for Academic Affairs. Langsdorf's tenure at Fullerton marked a period of enormous growth for the institution. During Langsdorf's tenure as president the enrollment grew from a few hundred students to more than 15,000 students, and from less than 200 FTES to more than 10,000 FTES. This also was a period of extensive construction that transformed the college from a small collection of temporary buildings on 238 acres (0.96 km^{2}) of orange groves to a campus with several permanent facilities including the Letters and Science Building (now McCarthy Hall), a performing arts building, a visual arts center, a library, a humanities building, and a large physical education and athletics complex that included a gymnasium, swimming pool, tennis courts, and athletic fields.

In 1974 the Administration-Business Administration Building was renamed Langsdorf Hall in President Langsdorf's honor.

Langsdorf died at the age of 93 in 2002.

Academic offices
Preceded by N/A	President of California State University, Fullerton; 1959-1970	Succeeded by L. Donald Shields
