= Kurt Suzuki =

American baseball manager & player (born 1983)

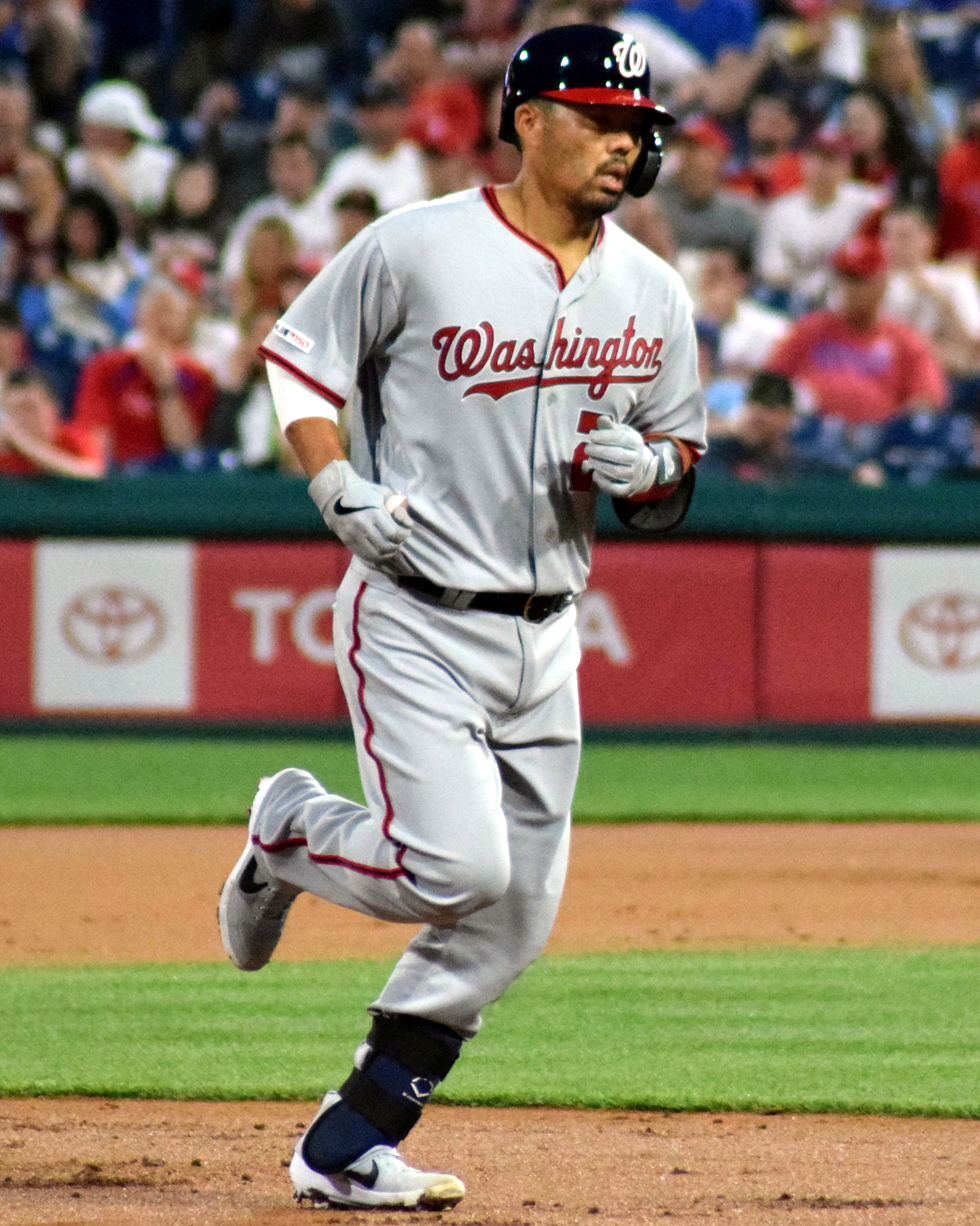
- Suzuki with the Washington Nationals in 2019
- Catcher / Manager
- Born: October 4, 1983 (age 43); Wailuku, Hawaii, U.S.
- Batted: Right Threw: Right

MLB debut
- June 12, 2007, for the Oakland Athletics

Last MLB appearance
- October 4, 2022, for the Los Angeles Angels

MLB statistics
- Batting average: .255
- Home runs: 143
- Runs batted in: 730
- Managerial record: 62–100
- Winning %: .383
- 3.shtml Stats at Baseball Reference
- Managerial record at Baseball Reference

Teams
- As player: Oakland Athletics (2007–2012); Washington Nationals (2012–2013); Oakland Athletics (2013); Minnesota Twins (2014–2016); Atlanta Braves (2017–2018); Washington Nationals (2019–2020); Los Angeles Angels (2021–2022); As manager: Los Angeles Angels (2026)

Career highlights and awards
- All-Star (2014); World Series champion (2019)

Kurtis Kiyoshi Suzuki (Japanese: 鈴木 清, romanized: Suzuki Kiyoshi, born October 4, 1983) is an American Baseball Special Assistant For Los Angeles Angels and former catcher. He played in MLB for the Oakland Athletics, Washington Nationals, Minnesota Twins, Atlanta Braves, and Los Angeles Angels. He was the manager of the Angels in 2026.

Before playing professionally, Suzuki attended Cal State Fullerton, and in 2004, won the College World Series and the Johnny Bench and Brooks Wallace awards. That year, the Athletics selected him in the second round of the MLB draft, and Suzuki made his MLB debut in 2007. He was named an MLB All-Star in 2014 as a member of the Twins while hitting a career-best .288. In 2019, Suzuki caught for the Nationals as they won the World Series.

== Early life ==
Suzuki was born to Warren and Kathleen Suzuki in Wailuku, Hawaii, and attended Henry Perrine Baldwin High School from which he graduated in 2001. Suzuki was mentored as a youth by Hawaiian MLB scout Walter Isamu Komatsubara. He managed a .328 batting average as a senior at Baldwin.

== College career ==
Suzuki attended California State University, Fullerton, where he played college baseball for the Cal State Fullerton Titans baseball team. CSUF appeared in the 2003 College World Series and captured the 2004 College World Series championship, thanks to Suzuki's two-out RBI single in the bottom of the seventh inning, giving the Titans a 3–2 win over the Texas Longhorns.

That year, he won the Johnny Bench Award as the country's top collegiate catcher. He was also selected All-American by two publications, Baseball America and Collegiate Baseball. He was also the recipient of the first-ever Brooks Wallace Award.

== Professional career ==
=== Draft and minor leagues ===
The Athletics drafted Suzuki in the second round of the 2004 Major League Baseball draft and assigned him to the Single-A Short Season Vancouver Canadians, where he batted .297 and committed just one error in 46 games.

His first full season of professional baseball came in 2005, with Single-A team the Stockton Ports. Playing in 114 games, Suzuki put up a .277 average, 12 home runs, 65 RBIs and a .440 slugging percentage.

Moving up to the Double-A Midland RockHounds in 2006, Suzuki batted .285 with a .392 OBP. He began the 2007 season with the Triple-A Sacramento River Cats.

=== Oakland Athletics ===
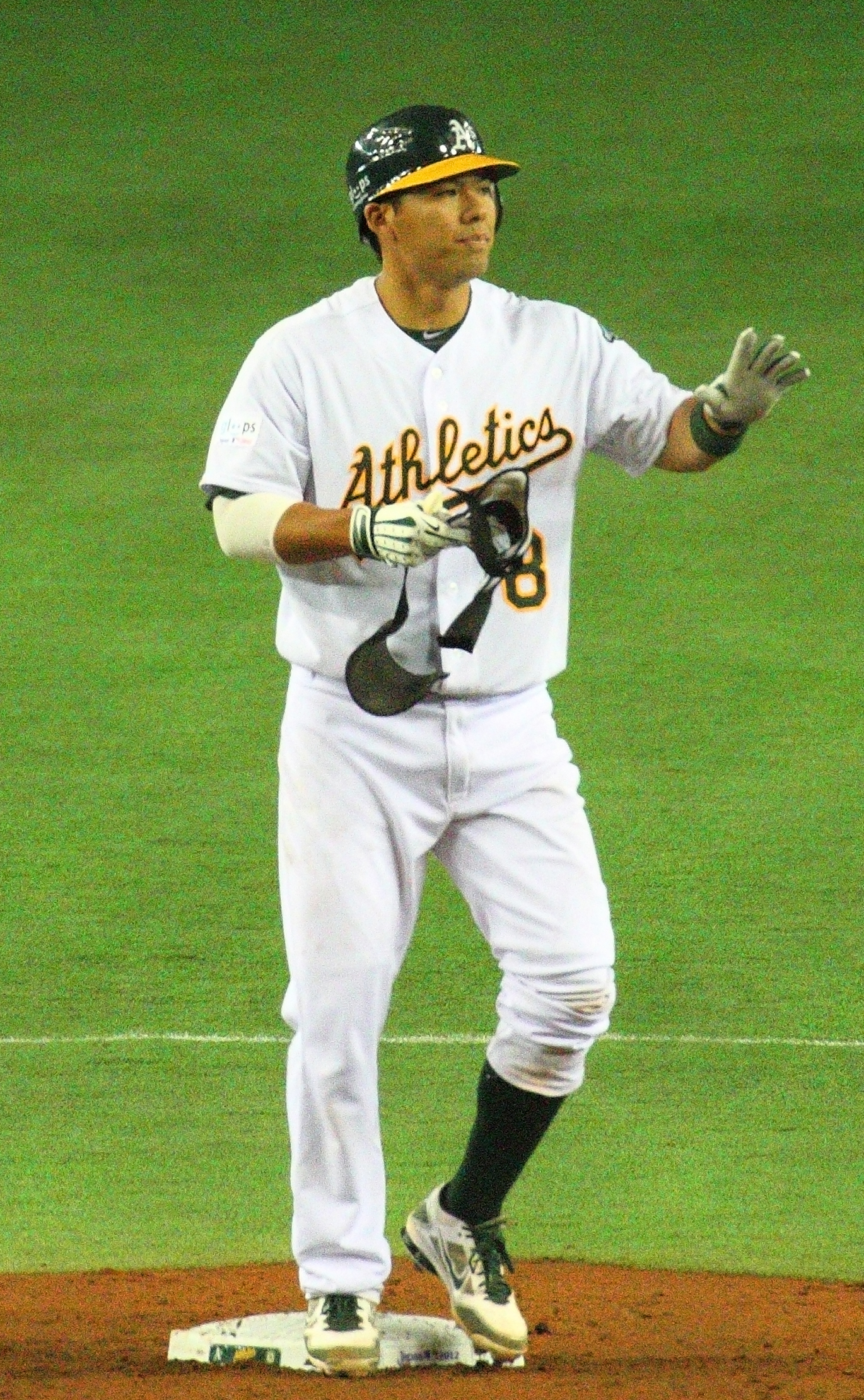
Suzuki with the Oakland Athletics in 2012

Suzuki joined the major league club on June 9, 2007, after rarely used catcher Adam Melhuse was traded to the Texas Rangers, and made his debut three days later as a pinch hitter in a game against the Houston Astros.

On September 10, 2007, Suzuki hit his first grand slam in the second inning against the Seattle Mariners.

For the 2008 season, Suzuki was the starting catcher while Rob Bowen served as backup. In the first 20 regular season games, Suzuki started 18. He ended the season with a .279 batting average in 148 games.

During the 2009 season, Suzuki had a career-high 15 home runs and 88 RBIs, and batted .274 in 147 games. Suzuki led the A's in RBIs, and became only the second catcher in the franchise's history to do so. He also led the team in hits (156), doubles (37) and total bases (240), and was second in home runs and runs scored behind teammate Jack Cust.

On July 23, 2010, Suzuki signed a four-year extension with the Oakland Athletics, estimated to be worth $16.25 million. At the end of the 2010 season, Suzuki ended with a .242 average with 13 home runs and 71 RBIs. The following season, he hit .237 with 14 home runs and 44 RBIs.

=== Washington Nationals ===
On August 3, 2012, Suzuki was traded to the Washington Nationals for minor league catcher David Freitas.

During the 2013 season, Suzuki platooned with Wilson Ramos. On May 12, 2013, Suzuki was ejected for the first time in his MLB career, after arguing with umpire John Tumpane on a strike-three call which was in fact off the plate.

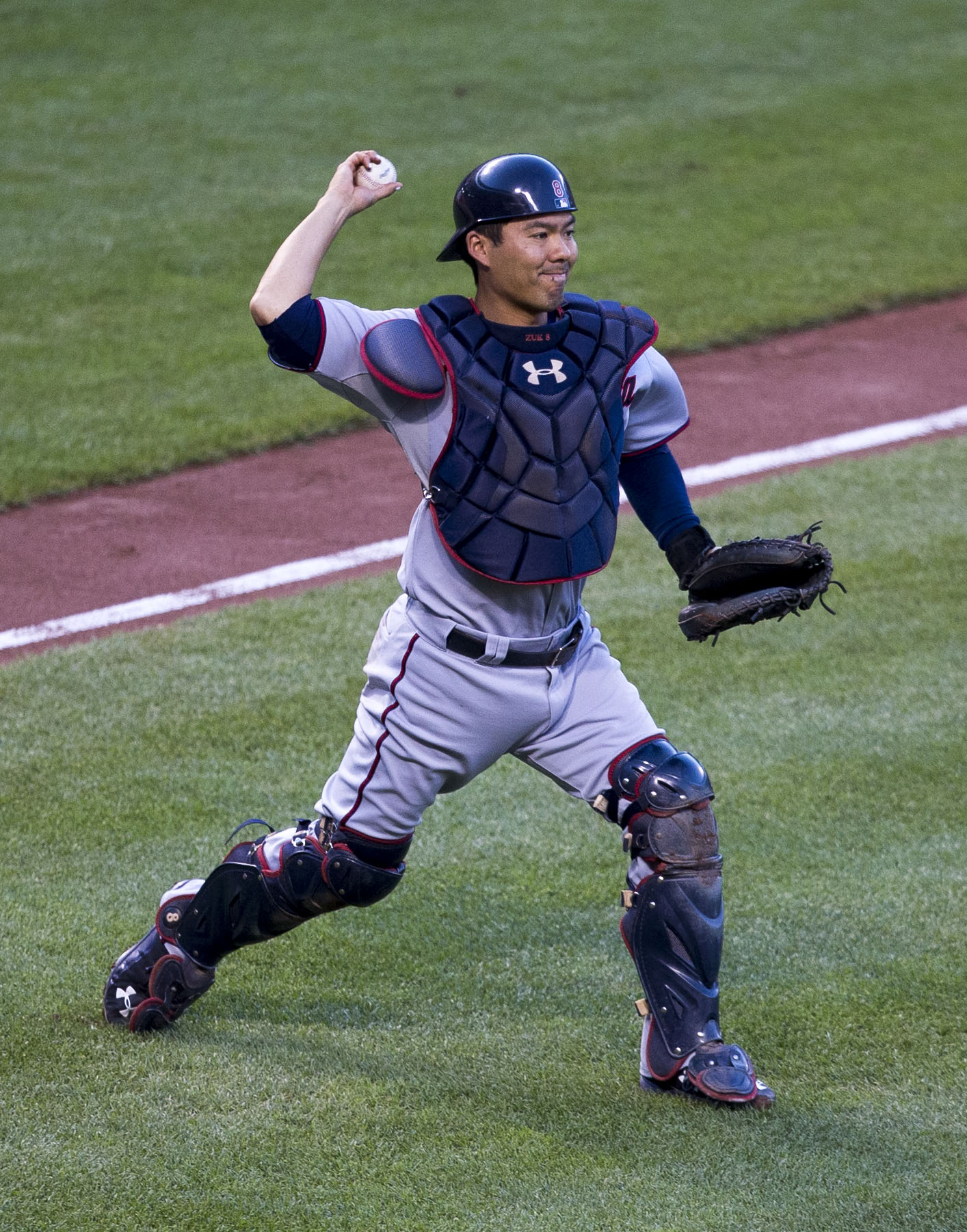
Suzuki with the Twins in 2015

=== Return to Oakland ===
On August 22, 2013, Suzuki was traded back to the Oakland Athletics for minor leaguer Dakota Bacus. He played in 15 games for Oakland in 2013.

=== Minnesota Twins ===
A free agent after the 2013 season, Suzuki signed with the Minnesota Twins on December 23, 2013.

Suzuki was named to the 2014 Major League Baseball All-Star Game, finishing up the game with his Twins battery-mate, Glen Perkins. He agreed to a two-year contract extension with the team on July 31, 2014. In his first season with Minnesota, he hit a career-high .288 with 3 home runs and 61 RBIs. The following season he hit .240 with 5 home runs and 50 RBIs. In 2016, he hit .258 with 8 home runs but had his season shortened due to injury.

=== Atlanta Braves ===
On January 30, 2017, Suzuki signed a one-year contract for $1.5 million with the Atlanta Braves. He set a career high in home runs that season, hitting 19 in 276 at-bats while platooning with Tyler Flowers. On September 23, 2017, Suzuki and the Braves agreed to a one-year extension worth $3.5 million. In 2018 he batted .271/.332/.444 with 12 home runs and 50 RBIs in 347 at bats.

=== Washington Nationals (second stint) ===
On November 20, 2018, the Washington Nationals announced that they had signed Suzuki to a two-year contract worth $10 million. In 2019 he batted .264/.324/.486 with 17 home runs and 63 RBIs in 280 at bats.

On October 23, 2019, Suzuki became the first Hawaii-born player to hit a home run in the World Series, doing so off of Justin Verlander in Game 2. A hip flexor strain scratched him from the remaining games of the series but the Nationals won in seven games, notching their first championship and earning Suzuki his first World Series ring.

In 2020, Suzuki allowed 28 stolen bases, tied for the NL lead.

=== Los Angeles Angels ===
On January 15, 2021, Suzuki signed a one-year, $1.5 million contract with the Los Angeles Angels. On April 20, Suzuki became the 16th catcher to record 10,000 career putouts at the position.

On March 16, 2022, Suzuki signed a one-year, $1.75 million contract to return to the Angels. On September 20, Suzuki announced his plans to retire at season's end. His final appearance came on October 4, his 39th birthday, and was against his original MLB team, the Oakland Athletics.

== Coaching career ==
On March 5, 2023, Suzuki was hired by the Los Angeles Angels to serve as a special assistant to the general manager. On October 21, 2025, Suzuki was named field manager for the Angels. In his first year, the Angels recorded their first 100-loss season in franchise history.

On October 21, 2026, the Angels declined Suzuki’s option for next year, and offered him a position as a special assistant. On November 10 he accepted the position to serve as a special assistant.

== Managerial record ==
Team	Year	Regular season					Postseason			
Team	Year	Games	Won	Lost	Win %	Finish	Won	Lost	Win %	Result
LAA	2026	162	62	100	.383	5th in AL West	–	–	–	
Total		162	62	100	.383		0	0	–	

== Personal life ==
Suzuki is a fourth-generation Japanese American. He was raised in Maui and graduated from Baldwin High School.

He married his wife Renee Marie Suzuki (née Vignery) in January 2007. They met at CSUF, where she was a fellow Titan who played volleyball. They have three children, a daughter born in April 2011 and sons born in November 2013 and July 2016. Suzuki took a brief paternity leave after his daughter's birth in 2011.

== Philanthropy ==
In 2012, Suzuki and his wife Renee founded the Kurt Suzuki Family Foundation, a charitable nonprofit dedicated to supporting scientific research into chronic illnesses and kidney diseases. He and his wife (along with Orlando and Katie Cabrera) have also helped former Titan catcher Jon Wilhite, who was severely injured in the car crash that killed Nick Adenhart.

== See also ==
- List of California State University, Fullerton people
- List of Japanese Americans
- List of Major League Baseball career games played as a catcher leaders
- List of Major League Baseball career putouts as a catcher leaders
- List of managers of Asian heritage in sports leagues in the United States and Canada
