= Joel K Abraham =

American ecologist and professor

Joel Kwamena Abraham is an American ecologist and professor at California State University Fullerton. His work focuses on how plant traits and competition shape invasion success by non-native plant species in California.

== Career and research ==
Joel K. Abraham completed his undergraduate degree in Biology at Howard University in 2000 and his PhD in Integrative Biology at University of California Berkeley. He conducted his PhD work with Wayne Sousa and Carla D'Antonio, producing a dissertation titled "On the Importance of Plant Phenology and Resource Use in the Invasion of California Coastal Grasslands". His dissertation notably contains a recipe for one of his study species (fennel). Abraham is currently a professor at California State University Fullerton. In addition to the topics of plant traits and invasion, Abraham's research also spans urban agriculture and biology education, and he served as the science consultant on the children's book "The Answer is Armadillos".

== Awards and accomplishments ==
In 2022, Abraham won the Carol Barnes Excellence in Teaching Award from CSUF, where he had been teaching since 2011.
