= El Dorado Ranch =

- Interactive map of the El Dorado Ranch area

General information
- Architectural style: Spanish Colonial Revival; Neo-Eclectic
- Location: 225 West Union Ave; Fullerton, California
- Coordinates: 33°52′43″N 117°55′39″W
- Completed: Built 1919; Remodeled 1953

El Dorado Ranch, previously known as the Chapman House, is the official residence of the President of California State University, Fullerton, located in Fullerton, California.

== History ==
The current home was first built in 1919, originally a two-story house in a Spanish Colonial Revival style. The estate was purchased in 1931 by Stanley Chapman, son of Charles Chapman, the first Mayor of Fullerton and an important entrepreneur in the development of the Valencia orange industry in Orange County.

In the 1950s, the house was extensively remodeled and enlarged, including the addition of the one-story wings that flank the original two-story Spanish structure.

The Chapman family donated the 4.5-acre property to California State University, Fullerton in 1989, with the stipulation that it be used as a residence for the university president.

The estate underwent major renovations in 2012.
