= Fred M. Johnson =

American physicist

- Education: City College of New York; Columbia University
- Occupation: Physicist

Fred M. Johnson is an American physicist. He was a professor in the department of physics at California State University, Fullerton.

In 1980, Johnson was named a fellow of the American Physical Society.
