= The Daily Titan =

Student newspaper at California State University, Fullerton

Daily Titan
- "The student voice of Cal State Fullerton"
- Type: Student newspaper
- Format: Broadsheet
- School: California State University, Fullerton
- Founded: 1960; 66 years ago
- Language: English
- Circulation: 4,500
- OCLC number: 15193278
- Website: dailytitan.com

The Daily Titan is the student newspaper published at California State University, Fullerton in Fullerton, California.

Under California law, Daily Titan is editorially independent from the university and the College of Communications. Daily Titan publishes a print edition Monday through Thursday during the fall and spring semesters, with weekly editions for the first two weeks of each semester and during finals week.

== History ==
From its founding in 1960 to spring 1968, the Daily Titan was known as the Titan Times, then briefly The Titan in fall 1968 and spring 1969. Throughout the 1960s, it published one to three times per week with occasional summer editions.

Daily Titan was given its current name and began publishing four editions each week in fall 1969. Roughly 60 reporters, editors and advertising sales executives, chosen each semester, form the staff. The news and advertising faculty advisers do not exercise editorial control.

In July 2025, the Fullerton City Council banned all non-governmental publications, including the Daily Titan, from distribution on city property.
