= Edwin Duerr =

Edwin Duerr (February 21, 1904 – August 13, 1985) was a theater and radio director. He was director of the Little Theater at University of California, Berkeley when he discovered Gregory Peck. He wrote the books The Length and Depth of Acting and Radio and Television Acting: Criticism, Theory and Practice. According to author Sean Egan in the James Kirkwood biography Ponies & Rainbows, Duerr co-wrote a play with Kirkwood called The Marriage Habit which failed to get staged.

Duerr served on the faculty of California State University, Fullerton as a Professor of Theater from September 1964 until June 1974, when he was granted emeritus status. While at Fullerton he became the subject of an investigation by a committee of the California State Senate because he had allowed one of his classes to stage a performance of the allegedly pornographic play The Beard, by Michael McClure. State Senators James E. Whetmore (R. Fulleron) and John G. Schmitz (R. Tustin) called for the firing of Duerr and also criticized the campus president, William B. Langsdorf for granting Duerr tenure. In May 1968 Duerr directed the first United States production in its entirety of the 1958 play by Max Frisch, The Firebugs.
