= L. Donald Shields =

American academic (born 1936)

8th President of Southern Methodist University
- In office 1980–1986
- Preceded by: James Zumberge
- Succeeded by: A. Kenneth Pye

2nd President of California State University, Fullerton
- In office 1971–1980
- Preceded by: William B. Langsdorf
- Succeeded by: Jewel Plummer Cobb

Personal details
- Born: September 18, 1936 (age 89) San Diego, California
- Education: University of California, Riverside (BA); University of California, Los Angeles (PhD)

Loran Donald Shields (born September 18, 1936) is an American academic. He was the president of California State University, Fullerton from 1971 to 1980, and of Southern Methodist University from 1980 to 1986.

== Early life and education ==
Loran Donald Shields was born on September 18, 1936, in San Diego, California. He received a B.A. in chemistry from the University of California, Riverside, and a PhD from the University of California at Los Angeles in 1964.

== Career ==
From 1963 to 1967, he taught in the chemistry department at California State University, Fullerton, at which time he became vice-president for administration. At the time of his appointment to the presidency of California State University, Fullerton in 1971, he was the youngest president of a public college or university in the United States.

He served as the president of California State University, Fullerton from 1971 to 1980, until he took on the presidency of Southern Methodist University. He resigned in 1986 because of health issues, at the time of the Southern Methodist University football scandal.

In 1974, President Gerald Ford appointed him to the National Science Board. He served on the National Science Board from 1974 to 1980. In 1989, he became the executive director of the California Council on Science and Technology, and remained in that position until 1995. He also served on the board of the Research Corporation for Science Advancement from 1983 to 1986, and on the National Commission for Cooperative Education.

Academic offices
Preceded by William B. Langsdorf	President of California State University, Fullerton; 1971–1980	Succeeded by Miles D. McCarthy
