= A. Kenneth Pye =

American academic (1931–1994)

9th President of Southern Methodist University
- In office 1987–1994
- Preceded by: L. Donald Shields
- Succeeded by: R. Gerald Turner

Personal details
- Born: August 21, 1931 New York City, New York, US
- Died: July 11, 1994 (aged 62) Lake City, Colorado, US
- Education: University of Buffalo (BA); Georgetown University (JD, LLM)

August Kenneth Pye (August 21, 1931 – July 11, 1994) was an American legal scholar who served as dean of the Duke University School of Law from 1968 to 1970 and again from 1973 to 1976, and as president of Southern Methodist University from 1987 to 1994.

== Early life and education ==
August Kenneth Pye was born in New York City in 1931. He graduated from the University at Buffalo with a B.A., and later received J.D. and LL.M. degrees from Georgetown University. While a student at Buffalo, he became a member of the Alpha Sigma Phi fraternity.

== Career ==
=== Duke University ===
He served as dean of Duke Law School from 1968 to 1970 and from 1973 to 1976.

=== Southern Methodist University ===
In 1987, Pye accepted an offer to become president of Southern Methodist University. The university was in disarray in the wake of a football scandal and struggled with a budget deficit, uneven quality in its colleges, and a national reputation for mediocre academics. Pye put together a taskforce which developed a proposal it called Toward the 21st Century: Excellence and Responsibility, that would, among other things, require all SMU students to have a liberal arts major or minor.

Pye proved capable of standing up to the school's powerful alumni and boosters. He was active on the NCAA Presidents Commission. In 1994 he resigned, citing health issues. Pye died of cancer later in 1994 in Lake City, Colorado. D Magazine wrote that his death "left a gaping hole" at the university.

Academic offices
Preceded by F. Hodge O'Neal	Dean of the Duke University School of Law; 1968–1970	Succeeded by Joseph Tyree Sneed III
Preceded by Joseph Tyree Sneed III	Dean of the Duke University School of Law; 1973–1976	Succeeded by Walter Dellinger
Preceded by L. Donald Shields	President of Southern Methodist University; 1987–1994	Succeeded by R. Gerald Turner
