= Ann Phong =

Vietnamese American painter (born 1957)

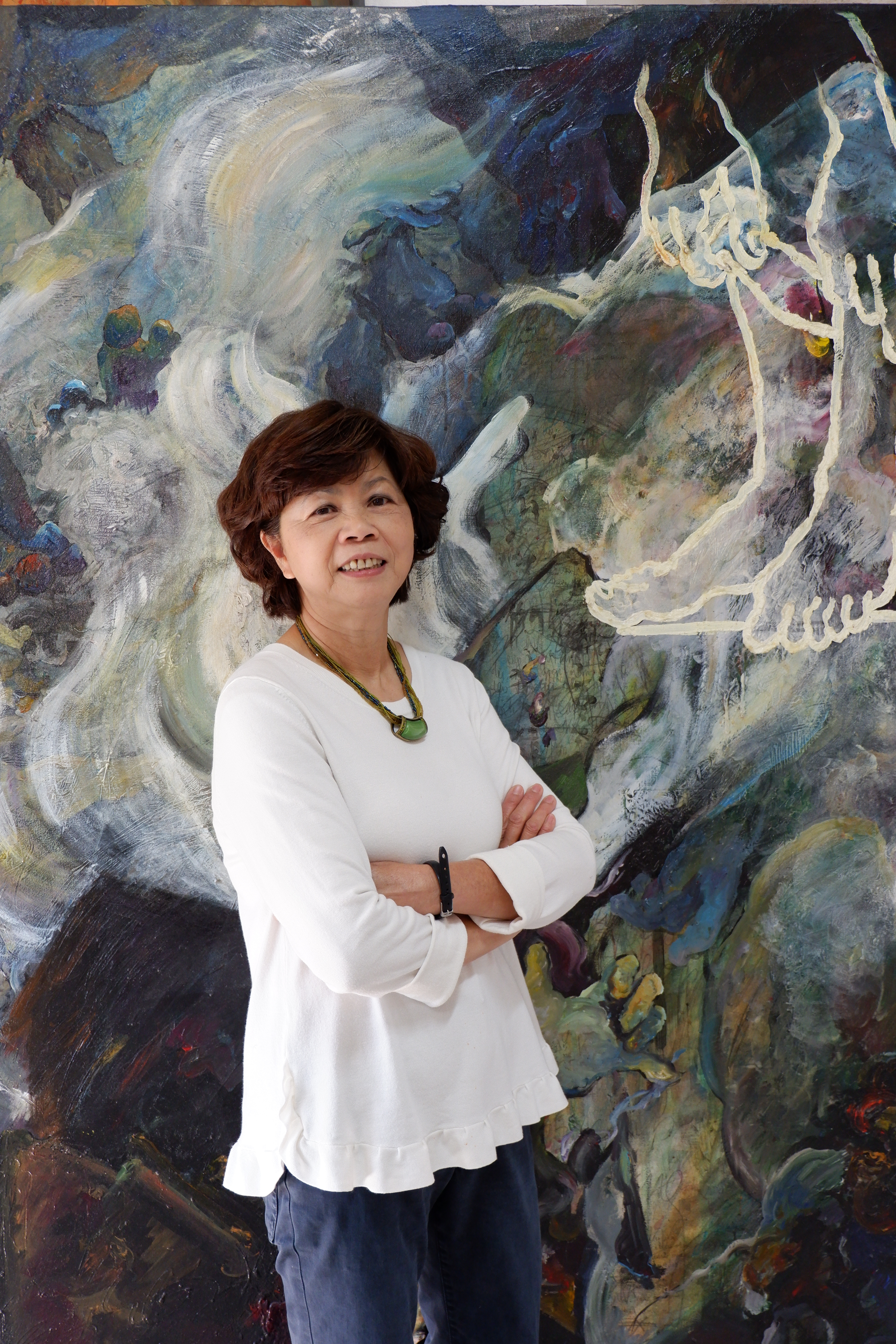
Ann Phong stands in front of her painting, Jump

Ann Phong (born 1957 in Saigon, Vietnam) is a Vietnamese American painter known for her paintings depicting her experience as a Vietnamese-American Woman and environmental issues.

== Personal life ==
Phong first developed her artistic abilities in Saigon, Vietnam. She applied to the only art school in Saigon after she finished high school, but was rejected twice. Soon thereafter, she decided to get her teaching credentials. She taught junior high and high school students. While doing so, she emphasized the importance of imagination and would sometimes tell her students Western fairytale stories they were prevented from hearing because of the Fall of Saigon.

She fled Vietnam in 1981 via boat. She was 22 years old. After three days at sea, Phong ended up in Malaysian and Filipino refugee camps for over a year before she was sponsored to go to Connecticut. She lived in Connecticut for a short period of time until she decided to move to Southern California in 1982.

Phong was working as a dental assistant with plans to become a dentist when she got into a car accident that inspired her to instead follow her passion for the arts. She went to Cal Poly Pomona for her undergraduate degree in fine arts and then Cal State Fullerton for her masters of fine arts in painting. Phong was intrigued by the many influential art history figures that she learned about in school but she was determined to have her own unique style.

Her early work and thesis focused primarily on her experiences as an immigrant, but Phong has recently begun exploring the theme of environmental issues in her artwork. She has said that part of the thought process behind these works was dispelling her Thalassophobia and revealing the beauty of the violence and calamity of the ocean.

She is now a professor who teaches art at Cal Poly Pomona, and was previously the Board President of the VAALA (Vietnamese American Arts and Letters Association) between 2009 and 2018.

In 2018, Phong received an individual artist grant from Santa Ana City.

== Artwork ==
Phong creates artwork in her own home with acrylic paints and found objects that she finds at relatives houses and her own. Her artwork has sold up to $1,000. Her technique includes utilizing juxtaposition with heavy impasto layers translating to finer, more transparent layers of paint. Though the subject of her artwork has fluctuated throughout the years, Phong has consistently produced artworks with heavy acrylic impasto texture. She has exhibited her work in Houston, Vancouver, Paris, Thailand, Japan and several cities all over California.

Many of her most recent environmentalist artworks have found objects embedded into the canvas while the acrylic paint is still wet. Phong has said that she tries to emulate the beauty of nature and humans' relationship to its destruction in her work. She also explores the theme of human beings as a part of nature in her work. Her experiences fleeing Vietnam by boat have prompted her to portray the ocean frequently, as is evidenced by her very visible, wave-like brushstrokes. Phong sees much of herself in the ocean, saying:

"The ocean is inside me. So now when I look back to my own painting, I notice that I have the ocean's personality. What I mean is that when I am happy, when I'm quiet, everything looks so calm and transparent like the water. Water can sparkle. It creates happiness for people. But when I am mad or when I am low, my brushstroke will be very violent or dark."

== Feminism ==
Prior to creating the mixed media works for which she is renowned, Phong painted about Vietnamese life, culture, and what it was like escaping. She often uses boats as a symbol of the female body as well as the embodiment of the struggle of Vietnamese immigrants escaping the Fall of Saigon. In her artist statement, she writes:

"In Vietnamese poetry, harbors are metaphors for men and boats are for women. Women are like boats due to their delicacy in shape and elegance in movement on water. “Boat people” was the label American newspapers and magazines gave the immigrants [over] two decades ago when they escaped Vietnamese communism and fled in small boats."

Phong went on to say that unmarried women from her culture are considered to be boats without harbors. Building off of this idea, Phong's early work contains many empty boats without harbors---a symbol of free-spirited women and the perilous journey Vietnamese "boat people" made to escape Vietnam. These boats are contrasted against violent brushstrokes that are meant to represent the ocean make Phong's early work a colorful storybook of pain and resilience.

== Environmentalism ==
Despite the sea having saved her, during her experience in the ocean, Phong recalls times where she saw toxic sludge of varying colors and debris floating on the surface. She brought attention to the issue with her “Fishes in the Water” (2018) where viewers can see a single fish swimming amongst waste. In later works like “Yesterday’s Precious, Today’s Trash” (from 2014 and 2018), she used pieces of trash that belonged to technology stating:

"We chase after technology too much. We are willing to throw the old phone away and buy the new phone. There’s a lot of computer (stuff) and technology in the paintings. They become the window, that link between yesterday and today."

== Notable works ==
Fragile Nature, 2017, mixed media, 20 x 40 in, Muckenthaler Cultural Center

Human Traces On earth #3, 2017, mixed media, 20 x 20 in, Muckenthaler Cultural Center

Yesterday’s Precious, Today’s Trash, 2018, acrylic with found objects, 27x15 in, Muckenthaler Cultural Center

Nature In The Cities #2, 2018, acrylic with found objects, 48 x 38 in, Muckenthaler Cultural Center
