= Emory Tolbert =

Emory J. Tolbert
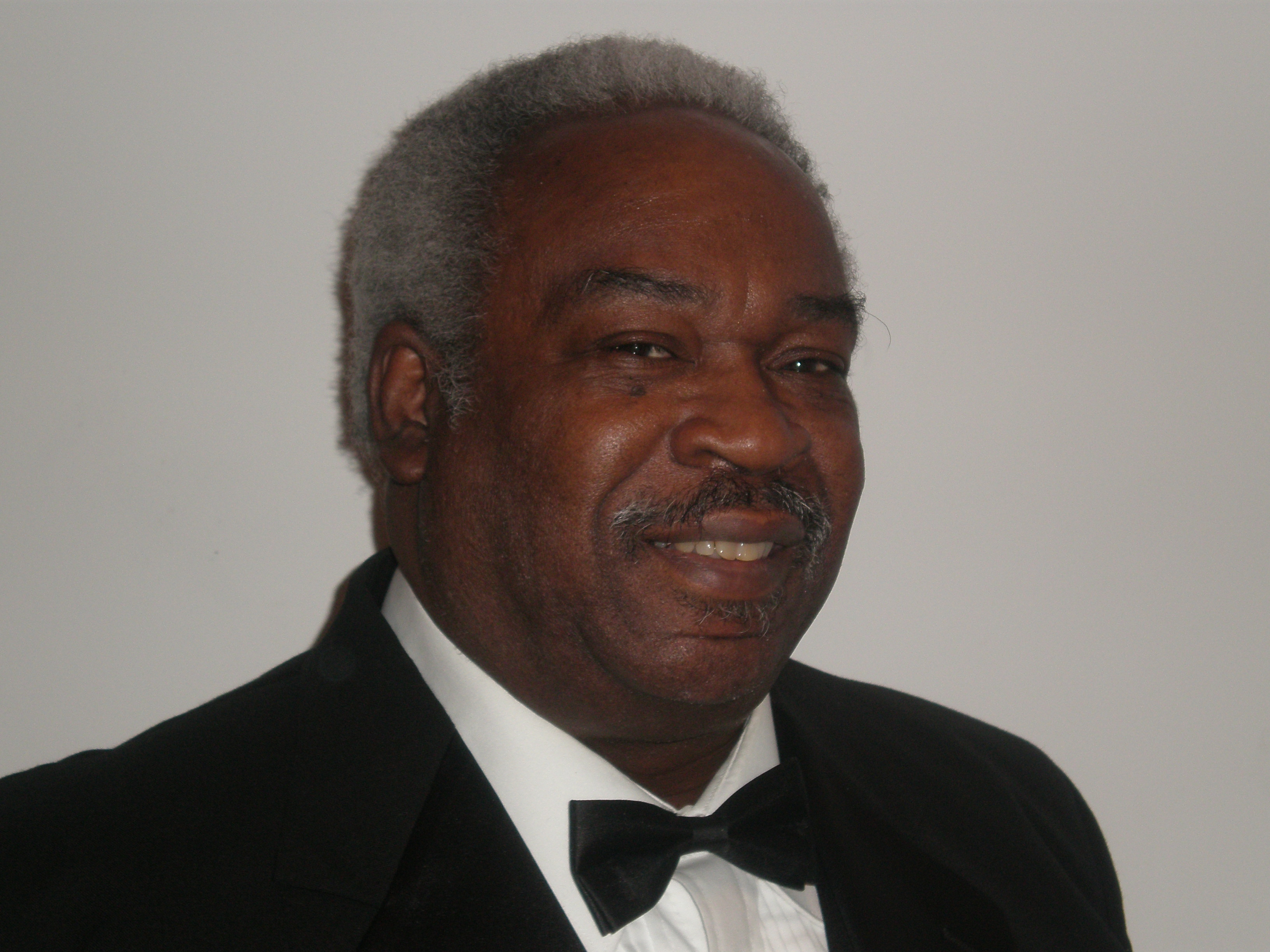
- Born: 26 December 1946; Sanford, Florida, U.S.
- Occupations: Education; activist

Academic background
- Education: Atlantic Union College

Academic work
- Discipline: History
- Institutions: Howard University; California State University, San Bernardino; California State University, Fullerton; University of Southern California; University of California, Los Angeles; University of California, San Diego

Emory J. Tolbert (1946-2022) was an American historian, educator, and activist. His scholarship centers on Marcus Garvey and Garveyism, as well as wider aspects of African American history.

== Early years and education ==
Emory Tolbert was born on December 26, 1946, to John and Johnie Mae Tolbert in Sanford, Florida. When he was three his family moved to Rochester, New York. Tolbert graduated cum laude from Atlantic Union College with a B.A. in History in 1968. In 1975, he earned a PhD in History from UCLA. His dissertation was a groundbreaking study of Marcus Garvey's Universal Negro Improvement Association and African Communities League chapters in Los Angeles.

== Career ==
While pursuing his doctorate, Tolbert was an instructor at UCLA, California State University, San Bernardino, University of Southern California, and University of California at San Diego (UCSD). His formal career as an educator began at Loma Linda University in 1968, where he taught the university's first course in African American History, as well as courses on American history and the American constitution.

From 1973 to 1981, Tolbert was an assistant professor in the department of History at UCSD, teaching the university's first course in African American History, and initiating an MA program in Social and Ethnic History. From 1984 to 1991, he was an associate and full professor at California State University at Fullerton in the department of History and the department of Afro-American and Ethnic Studies. In 1987, he became chair of the Afro-American and Ethnic Studies Department.

In 1991, Tolbert assumed the position of chair of Howard University's History department, holding the post until 1998, then again from 2002 to 2005, and 2009. While at Howard, Tolbert inaugurated a geography program, expanded the public history program, and initiated the historical research for the New York Burial Ground Project.

== Scholarship ==
Tolbert's specialty was Garveyism. His 1980 The UNIA and Black Los Angeles was the first regional study of the Marcus Garvey movement. He has focused particularly on the impact of Garveyism in Los Angeles, and on the West Coast, but has also conducted studies on the UNIA (Universal Negro Improvement Association) chapters nationwide. Tolbert was the senior editor of volumes 1-4 of the Marcus Garvey and Universal Negro Improvement Association Papers, the largest scholarly project of Garvey materials.

Tolbert was known for having one of the largest personal collections of African American memorabilia. He was active in the Sabbath in Africa movement (SIA), which conducts original scholarship on Christianity in Sub-Saharan Africa.

== Personal life ==
Tolbert was married to Frances Jones on August 1, 1976. They have two daughters, Denise (Defoe) and Erin.

Tolbert died on October 4, 2022.

== Selected works ==
- Tolbert, E.J. The UNIA and Black Los Angeles. Los Angeles: UCLA Center for Afro-American Studies, 1980.
- Tolbert, E.J, senior editor. Marcus Garvey and Universal Negro Improvement Association Papers, Volumes 1-4. Los Angeles: University of California Press, 1983-1984.
- Tolbert, E.J. and Carl E. Jackson, eds. Race and Culture in America. Edina, MN: Burgess Press, 1986.
- Tolbert, E.J., ed. A Treasure Chest of Afro-American Culture. Santa Ana: Orange County Board of Education, 1988.
- Tolbert, E.J. Perspectives on the African Diaspora, Volumes 1-2 (first and second editions). New York: Houghton Mifflin, 1998-2001.

== See also ==
- Marcus Garvey
- Universal Negro Improvement Association and African Communities League
- Pan-Africanism
- Black Power
- University of California Los Angeles
- Howard University
- African Christianity
