= Miles D. McCarthy =

Miles D. McCarthy (October 12, 1914 – September 20, 1995) was one of the five founding faculty members of California State University, Fullerton. He served as acting president of the university for nine months during 1981 upon the resignation of the university's second president, L. Donald Shields.

McCarthy received his B.S. degree from West Chester State College (now West Chester University). In 1943 he was awarded a Ph.D. in zoology from the University of Pennsylvania. McCarthy's research in the area of hematological studies of burns and autoimmunity resulted in 35 peer-reviewed publications.

McCarthy was throughout his career at Cal State Fullerton a professor of biology, who also held several administrative posts at the university including Chair of the Biology Department, Dean of the School of Letters, Arts, and Sciences, and Vice President for Academic Affairs. In his role as a founding faculty member, McCarthy was responsible for hiring the new faculty needed to staff a number of academic departments in the sciences. It was McCarthy who hired L. Donald Shields as a faculty member in the Chemistry Department. Shields became the second president of the university in 1971.

McCarthy also established the Health Professions Advising Office at Cal State Fullerton. This office advises students who are seeking careers in medicine, dentistry, veterinary medicine, and the allied health professions. Since its creation, the office has had an 85% success record in placing students who have completed the program in professional schools in the health sciences.

Except for the nine months he spent as Acting President, McCarthy continued to teach two classes each semester while holding his administrative positions.

In 1984 the Letters, Arts, and Sciences Building on the Cal State Fullerton campus, the first permanent building on the campus, was named in Dr. McCarthy's honor.

Academic offices
Preceded by L. Donald Shields	President of California State University Fullerton (acting); 1981	Succeeded by Jewel Plummer Cobb
