= S. Craig Watkins =

S. Craig Watkins is an American professor at the University of Texas at Austin and a media professional involved primarily with interactions between youth culture and the digital age. His research explores connections between race, culture, and education, as well as how certain aspects of media are affecting young adults. He has spoken at many American universities, and has been a guest on National Public Radio as well as a speaker at media conferences across the country.

== Background ==
S. Craig Watkins is a prominent figure in the media world. Watkins focuses primarily on researching youth culture and how young adults are being affected by technology and the digital age. He has explored many aspects of the digital age in his work, including the effects of Hip Hop in African American communities, how gaming is connected with race, culture, and education, and the evolution of social media platforms.

Watkins received his PhD from the University of Michigan, and currently teaches at the University of Texas at Austin as a professor of Radio, Television and Film, as well as African American Studies and Sociology. At the University, he serves as a Faculty Fellow for the Division of Diversity and Community Engagement. Watkins is also a Global Fellow for the IC², a group of individuals from around the world that work collaboratively on creative, academic, and innovative ideas. He is one of 160 members, including 18 faculty members from the University of Texas, Austin, in the Program. Fellows in this program include experts in technology, commercialization, innovative management, chaos theory, entrepreneurship, alliance building, and regional economic activity.

Watkins has been invited to be a Research Fellow at Stanford’s Center for Advanced Study in the Behavioral Sciences. The Center seeks to integrate innovative thinkers in order to advance society’s understanding of social, cultural, historical, psychological, and scientific issues. Fellows at Stanford’s Center for Advanced Study are focusing on preventing future economic and social issues on a global scale.

== Literature and publishing ==
S. Craig Watkins has been exploring the trends and behavior of young individuals use of digital media. Watkins founded “The Young and the Digital” website after a decade of research, observation and interviews with hundreds of young adults. He believes that media includes both technology and a social context. Depending on gender, age and race directs how social media is used and in what platforms.

Watkins' understanding of the digital youth and new social platforms is unique. Watkins most recent book The Young and the Digital: What the Migration to Social Network Sites, Games, and Anytime, Anywhere Media Means for our Future analyzes the relationship between students and social media. In one interview he explains what the “new age of social networking and media” means for future teachers and employers. Students now have access to so much technology through their phones, laptops and wifi that technology platforms have changed the game of learning. Watkins sees the traditional style of teaching and of accessing information as outdated. Lecturing may not be the most effective form of presenting information to students. As Watkins puts it, “They’re active learners, as opposed to passive learners. The one-way flow of content- I don’t know how effective that is anymore”.

In "The Young and the Digital," Watkins compares the automobile and the telephone – and the criticism both developments incurred when they first began to transform society (fostering “far flung relationships” and “inauthentic intimacy”) – to the skepticism felt by older generations toward rampant internet, social media and game usage of contemporary teenage and youth generations. A key point that they miss when considering youth technology culture, he mentions, is that teenagers and young adults are using technology to communicate with people they already know: consuming, sharing and producing media for the friends and classmates they interact with in off-line life already. In this way, youth technology usage is much more about fostering relationships that already exist than creating new ones with strangers (i.e.: through dating profiles, chat rooms, etc.). The modern teenager and young adult has learned to braid off-line and online lives together, socially, academically (with the influx of teachers employing web-based learning tools in their curriculums) and personally.

Watkins' earlier writing focuses on topics that explore race, media and youth culture. His book Hip Hop Matters: Politics, Pop Culture and the Struggle for the Soul of a Movement gave him an almost iconic status within the hip-hop community. Watkins explains that this book reaches further than just hip-hop music. He wanted to examine how the culture of hip-hop has progressed through stages of social change. Specifically he looks at the relationship between African American youth, media platform, economics and politics.

== Community involvement and appearances ==
Watkins is in demand as a speaker and educator. In addition to his primary teaching position at the University of Texas at Austin, he has been a valuable guest lecturer at various universities and conferences nationwide. In February 2010, Watkins gave the opening keynote address at the first annual Digital Media and Learning Conference in La Jolla, California. His speech, titled “How Black and Latino Youth are remaking the Participation Gap”, focused on how minorities, particularly black and Latino youth, are changing how technology is used and how accessible it is. Other high profile conferences he contributed to include the Hechinger Institute on Education and the Media, SXSW Interactive Festival, the 2011 Literary Festival, International Festival on Weblogs and Social Media, and the National Institute on Drug Abuse.

Watkins has also been a guest speaker on the campuses of the University of Wisconsin, Northwestern University, Foothill College, Georgetown Law School, Columbia University, George Mason University, Florida State University, Rice University and Ohio State University. The majority of the speeches and lectures given at these conferences and universities have focused on his research involving technology, media, youth, race, and society. In addition to his public appearances, he has been a guest on National Public Radio, Internet Evolution Radio, and Progressive Radio. In the future, Watkins plans to continue to speak on the national stage on social media in the digital age and how it affects society, and will begin to speak on new research involving education and digital media as it is completed. His writing can be found in his three books, The Young and the Digital, Hip Hop Matters, and Representing, and also on his blogs for the Huffington Post and DML Central.
