= Lawrence B. de Graaf =

American historian

Lawrence Brooks de Graaf
- Born: August 30, 1932 (age 94); Yonkers, New York, U.S.
- Education: Occidental College (BA); UCLA (MA, PhD)
- Occupations: Professor emeritus of History, California State University, Fullerton
- Spouse: Shirley Ferguson (1959-present)
- Children: 1 (daughter)
- Parents: Kathryn née Brooks (mother); Jacob C. de Graaf (father)

Lawrence Brooks de Graaf (born August 30, 1932, in Yonkers, New York) is an American historian. He is a professor emeritus of History at California State University, Fullerton, where he is the namesake of the Lawrence de Graaf Center for Oral and Public History.

De Graaf was the oldest son of Kathryn née Brooks and Jacob C. de Graaf, a salesman whose parents had immigrated from Rotterdam in 1909. He grew up in various places in New York State before moving in 1944 to Glendale, California, where his father had taken a job with Sun Oil. De Graaf received a bachelor's degree in history from Occidental College in Los Angeles in 1954 and both an M.A. and PhD in history from UCLA, the latter in 1962 with the dissertation Negro migration to Los Angeles, 1930 to 1950. In February 1959 he married Shirley Ferguson, with whom he would raise a daughter. In the fall of 1959, he was hired among the first faculty of the new Orange County State College (to be renamed California State University, Fullerton). De Graaf remained at Fullerton his whole career, retiring in 2002.

In 2006, the Los Angeles City Historical Society honored de Graaf with its Miriam Matthews Ethnic History Award for chronicling Southern California's ethnic history. In 2014, he was inducted into the International Youth-on-the-Move International Educators’ Hall of Fame Awards at Chapman University.

== Works ==
- de Graaf, Lawrence B.; Mulroy, Kevin; Taylor, Quintard (2001). Seeking El Dorado: African Americans in California. Seattle, Washington: University of Washington Press. ISBN 9780295980836. OCLC 918345356.
- de Graaf, Lawrence B. (2009). The Fullerton Way: 50 Years of Memories at California State University, Fullerton. Fullerton, California: Center for Oral and Public History/California State University. ISBN 9780930046262. OCLC 319595153.
