= California State University, Fullerton =

Public university in Fullerton, California, US

- Former names: Orange County State College (1957–1962); Orange State College (1962–1964); California State College at Fullerton (1964–1972)
- Motto: Vox Veritas Vita (Latin)
- Motto in English: "Voice, Truth, Life"
- Type: Public research university
- Established: 1957; 69 years ago
- Parent institution: California State University
- Accreditation: WSCUC
- Academic affiliations: CONAHEC; CUMU; USU
- Endowment: $148.7 million (2023-24)
- Budget: $595.3 million (2024-25)
- President: Ronald S. Rochon
- Students: 43,662 (fall 2024)
- Undergraduates: 38,597 (fall 2024)
- Postgraduates: 5,065 (fall 2024)
- Location: Fullerton, California, United States; 33°52′50″N 117°53′07″W
- Campus: 236 acres (96 ha); Large suburb
- Newspaper: The Daily Titan
- Colors: Blue and orange
- Nickname: Titans
- Sporting affiliations: NCAA Division I – Big West; MPSF
- Mascot: Tuffy the Titan
- Website: fullerton.edu

California State University, Fullerton (CSUF or Cal State Fullerton) is a public research university in Fullerton, California, United States. With a total enrollment of more than 41,000, it has the largest student body of the California State University (CSU) system, and its graduate student body of more than 5,000 is one of the largest in the CSU and in all of California. As of fall 2016, the school had 2,083 faculty, of whom 782 were on the tenure track. The university offers 109 degree programs: 55 undergraduate degrees and 54 graduate degrees, including three doctoral programs.

Cal State Fullerton is classified among "Research 2: High Research Spending and Doctorate Production". It is also a Hispanic-Serving Institution (HSI) and is eligible to be designated as an Asian American Native American Pacific Islander Serving Institution (AANAPISI).

CSUF athletic teams compete in Division I of the NCAA and are collectively known as the CSUF Titans. They compete in the Big West Conference.

== History ==
=== Founding ===
In 1957, Orange County State College became the 12th state college in California to be authorized by the state legislature as a degree-granting institution. The following year, a site was designated for the campus to be established in northeast Fullerton. The property was purchased in 1959. The same year, William B. Langsdorf was appointed as founding president of the school.

Classes began with 452 students in September 1959. The name of the school was changed to Orange State College in July 1962. In 1964, its name was changed to California State College at Fullerton. In June 1972, the final name change occurred and the school became California State University, Fullerton.

=== Mascot ===
The choice of the elephant as the university's mascot, dubbed Tuffy the Titan, dates to 1962, when the campus hosted "The First Intercollegiate Elephant Race in Human History." The May 11 event attracted 10,000 spectators, 15 pachyderm entrants, and worldwide news coverage.

=== Campus violence ===
The campus has seen three significant instances of violence with people killed. On July 12, 1976, Edward Charles Allaway, a campus janitor with paranoid schizophrenia, shot nine people, killing seven, in the University Library (now the Pollak Library) on the Cal State Fullerton campus. At the time, it was the worst mass shooting in Orange County history.

On October 13, 1984, Edward Cooperman, a physics professor, was shot and killed by his former student, Minh Van Lam, in McCarthy Hall.

On August 19, 2019, Steven Shek Keung Chan, a retired budget director working as a consultant in the international student affairs office, was found dead from multiple stab wounds in a campus parking lot. Chuyen Vo, a co-worker in the same office, was charged with murder.

=== 2000s: Modern growth ===
The university grew rapidly in the first decade of the 2000s. The Performing Arts Center was built in January 2006, and in the summer of 2008 the newly constructed Steven G. Mihaylo Hall and the new Student Recreation Center opened.

In fall 2008, the Performing Arts Center was renamed the Joseph A.W. Clayes III Performing Arts Center, in honor of a $5 million pledge made to the university by the trustees of the Joseph A.W. Clayes III Charitable Trust. Since 1963, the curriculum has expanded to include many graduate programs, including multiple doctorate degrees, as well as numerous credential and certificate programs.

In 2021, president of the university Framroze Virjee acknowledged the university's location on the lands of the Tongva and Acjachemen and pledged for the university to be more committed toward partnering with Indigenous peoples.

== Campus ==
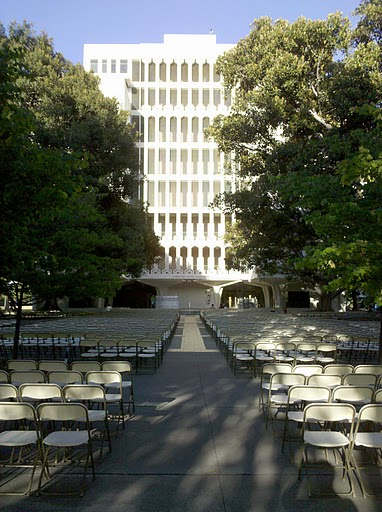
The College of Humanities and Social Sciences, 2010

The campus is on the site of former citrus groves in northeast Fullerton. It is bordered on the east by the Orange Freeway (SR-57), on the west by State College Boulevard, on the north by Yorba Linda Boulevard, and on the south by Nutwood Avenue.

Although established in the late 1950s, much of the initial construction on campus took place in the late 1960s, under the supervision of artist and architect Howard van Heuklyn, who gave the campus a striking, futuristic architecture (buildings like Pollak Library South, Titan Shops, Humanities, McCarthy Hall). This was in response to the numerous Googie buildings in the Fullerton community.

The University Archives & Special Collections in the Pollak Library houses the Philip K. Dick papers and Frank Herbert papers as part of the Willis McNelly Science Fiction collection.

Since 1993, the campus has added the College Park Building, Steven G. Mihaylo Hall, University Hall, the Titan Student Union, the Student Recreation Center, the Nutwood Parking Structure, the State College Parking Structure, Dan Black Hall, Joseph A.W. Clayes III Performing Arts Center West, Phase III Housing, the Grand Central Art Center, and Pollak Library. In order to generate power for the university and become more sustainable, the campus installed solar panels on top of a number of buildings. The panels, which generate up to 7–8 percent of the electrical power used daily, are atop the Eastside Parking Structure, Clayes Performing Arts Center and the Kinesiology and Health Science Building.

In August 2011, the university added a $143 million housing complex, which included five new residence halls, a convenience store and a 565-seat dining hall called the Gastronome.

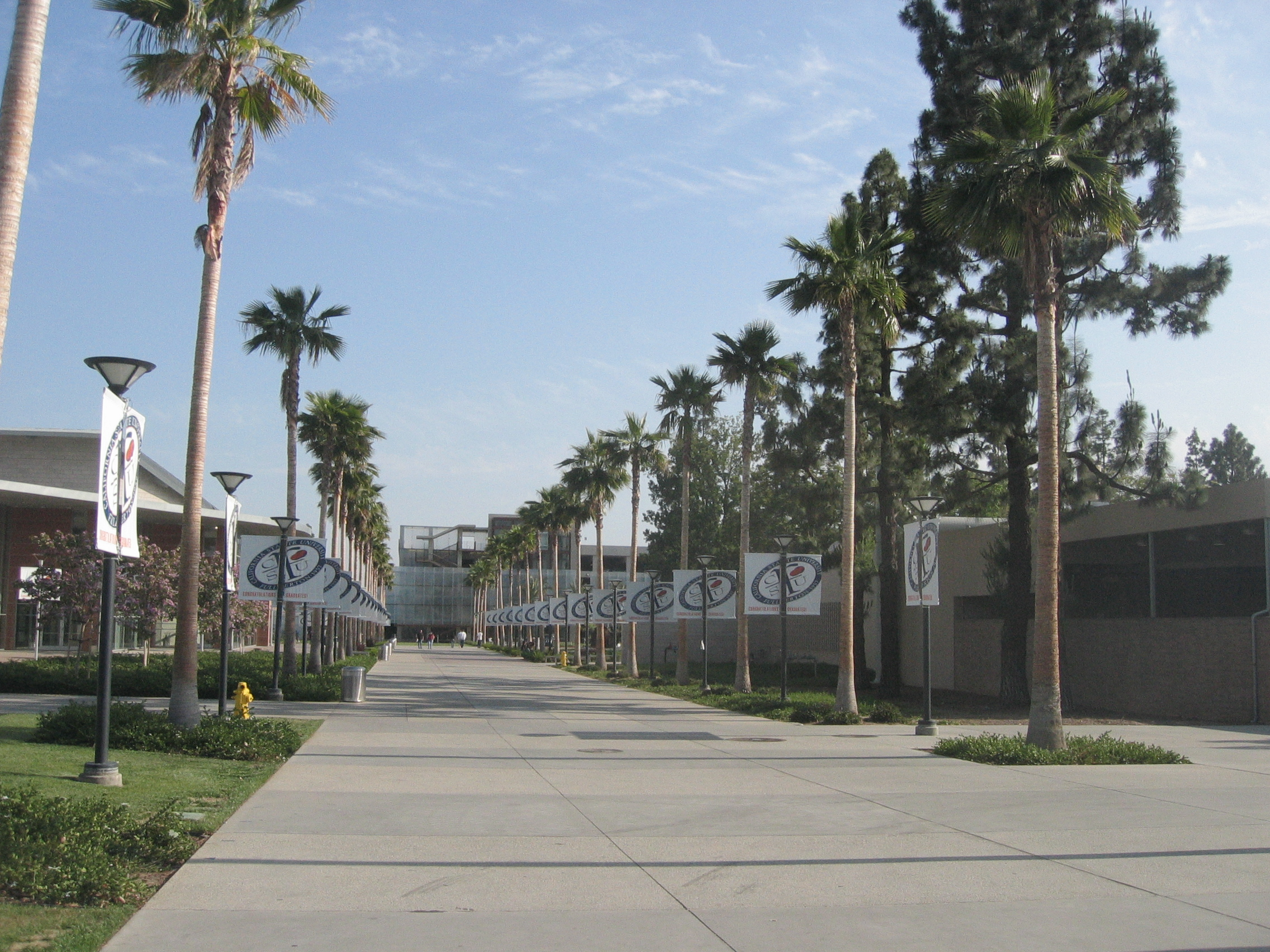
Pathway leading to the parking structure, 2010

El Dorado Ranch serves as the university president's residence.

=== Satellite campus ===
The university opened a satellite campus in Irvine, California in 1989, approximately 20 miles (32 km) south of the original Fullerton location. Amid the COVID-19 pandemic, the satellite campus closed in July 2021.

=== Proposed expansion ===
CSUF announced plans in May 2010 to buy the lot occupied by Hope International University, but this deal fell through.

CSUF also announced plans in September 2010 to expand into the area south of Nutwood Avenue to construct a project called CollegeTown, which would integrate the surrounding residential areas and retail spaces into the campus. After community opposition, the Fullerton planning commission indefinitely postponed any action on the project in February 2016.

=== Desert Studies Center ===
The Desert Studies Center is a field station of the California State University located in Zzyzx, California in the Mojave Desert. The purpose of the center is to provide opportunities to conduct research, receive instruction and experience the Mojave Desert environment. It is officially operated by the California Desert Studies Consortium, a consortium of seven CSU campuses: Fullerton, Cal Poly Pomona, Long Beach, San Bernardino, Northridge, Dominguez Hills and Los Angeles.

== Academics ==
=== Admissions and enrollment ===
Undergraduate admission statistics
	Fall 2025	Fall 2024	Fall 2023	Fall 2022	Fall 2021
First-time Freshmen
Applicants	55,289	53,559	48,591	48,749	45,140
Admits	48,716	48,482	42,149	32,527	26,827
Admit rate	88%	91%	87%	67%	59%
Enrolled	6,787	6,887	7,070	5,280	4,219
Yield rate	14%	14%	17%	16%	16%
Transfers
Applicants	22,217	22,039	21,268	22,644	25,207
Admits	17,127	17,163	16,221	13,819	13,965
Admit rate	77%	78%	76%	61%	55%
Enrolled	5,061	5,003	4,432	4,520	4,188
Yield rate	30%	29%	27%	33%	30%

As of the fall 2013 semester, CSUF is the third most applied to CSU out of all 23 campuses receiving nearly 65,000 applications, including over 40,000 for incoming freshmen and nearly 23,000 transfer applications, the second highest in the CSU.

For the 2024–2025 academic year, the middle 50% of enrolled students scored between 1080 and 1340 on the SAT (with a 50th percentile of 1210), between 540 and 680 on the SAT Evidence-Based Reading and Writing section (50th percentile: 610), and between 540 and 660 on the SAT Math section (50th percentile: 600).

=== Rankings and distinctions ===
Academic rankings

Master's
- Washington Monthly: 60

Regional
- U.S. News & World Report: 136 (National Universities) (tie)

National
- Forbes: 100
- WSJ/College Pulse: 392

2024–2025 USNWR departmental rankings
Nursing–Anesthesia	7
Nursing–Midwifery	32
Part-time MBA	105
Fine Arts	110
Speech–Language Pathology	120
Social Work	120
Public health	137
Public Affairs	144

Top 10 foreign countries in headcount (Fall 2025)
Country	Headcount
India	272
Vietnam	124
South Korea	56
China	55
Japan	37
United Arab Emirates	20
Cambodia	17
Indonesia	17
Germany	16
Myanmar	14

- The 2024 edition of U.S. News & World Report ranked Fullerton tied for 2nd "Performers on Social Mobility", tied 70 in top public schools, tied 31 for best undergraduate teaching, 211 for best value schools, and the undergraduate engineering program tied for 40, tied 8 in computer engineering, tied 8 in civil engineering and tied 9 in electrical/electronic/communications, tied 201 in economics, and tied 154 for Nursing.
- Money magazine ranked Cal State Fullerton 34th in the country out of 739 schools evaluated for its 2020 "Best Colleges for Your Money" edition and 22nd in its list of the 50 best public schools in the U.S.

== Athletics ==
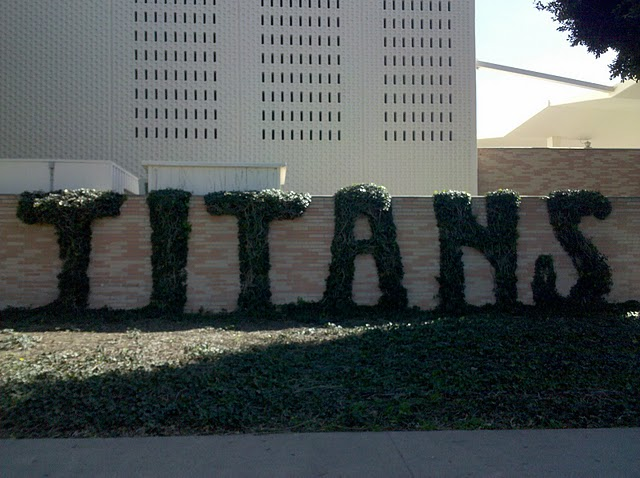
"Titans" on the exterior of Titan Gym, 2010

CSUF participates in the NCAA Division I Big West Conference and MPSF. Cal State Fullerton Athletics boasts 31 national championships covering 11 sports and dating back to its first in 1967. There are 12 team national titles and 19 individual championships. The Titans became an NCAA Div. I program for the 1974–75 academic year and have since produced 11 (6 team and 5 individual) national titles, four of them by the Titans' baseball team. Eighteen of the titles come from men's sports, 12 from women's. 12 team national championships in eight different sports. (1970, women's basketball (CIAW); 1971, 1972, 1974 men's gymnastics; 1971 cross country team; 1973 women's fencing; 1979, women's gymnastics; 1979, 1984, 1995, 2004 baseball; 1986 softball). Their baseball team is a perennial national powerhouse with four national titles and dozens of players playing Major League Baseball. The CSUF Dance Team currently holds the most national titles at the school, with 15 national titles from UDA Division 1 Jazz; 2000, 2001, 2002, 2003, 2004, 2006, 2007, 2008, 2010, 2011, 2012, 2013, 2014, 2015, 2016 and 2017; and one national title from UDAs in Division 1 Hip Hop. The Dance Team also holds multiple titles from United Spirit Association.

CSUF holds the Ben Brown Invitational every track and field season. CSUF currently supports 21 club sports on top of its Division I varsity teams, which are archery, baseball, cycling, equestrian, grappling and jiu jitsu, ice hockey, men's lacrosse, women's lacrosse, nazara Bollywood dance, men's rugby, women's rugby, roller hockey, salsa team, men's soccer, women's soccer, table tennis, tennis, ultimate Frisbee, men's volleyball, women's volleyball, skiing, and wushu.

Because of the proximity to Long Beach State, the schools are considered rivals. The rivalry is especially heated in baseball with the Long Beach State baseball team also having a competitive college baseball program.

== Student life ==
Undergraduate demographics as of fall 2023
Race and ethnicity	Total
Hispanic	52.3%
Asian	21.0%
White	15.2%
Two or more races	3.6%
Foreign national	2.8%
Black	2.5%
Unknown	2.5%
Native Hawaiian/Pacific Islander	0.2%
Native American	0.1%
Economic diversity
Low-income (Note: The percentage of students who received an income-based federal Pell grant intended for low-income students.)	48%
Affluent (Note: The percentage of students who are a part of the American middle class at the bare minimum.)	52%

CSUF was the first college in Orange County to have a Greek system, with its first fraternity founded in 1960. The Daily Titan, the official student newspaper of the university, also started in 1960. Other official student media includes Titan Radio.

On April 23, 2014, Cal State Fullerton opened the Titan Dreamers Resource Center. The center was the first resource center for undocumented students in the CSU system.

== Notable alumni ==
CSUF alumni include an astronaut who, as of June 2024, is participating in her third trip to space; a speaker of the California Assembly; other politicians and Academy Award-winning directors, actors, producers, and cinematographers; award-winning journalists, authors, and screenwriters; nationally recognized teachers; presidents and CEOs of leading corporations; international opera stars, musicians, and Broadway stars; professional athletes and Olympians; doctors, scientists and researchers; and social activists.

Titan alumni number more than 210,000. An active alumni association keeps them connected through numerous networking and social events, and also sponsors nationwide chapters.

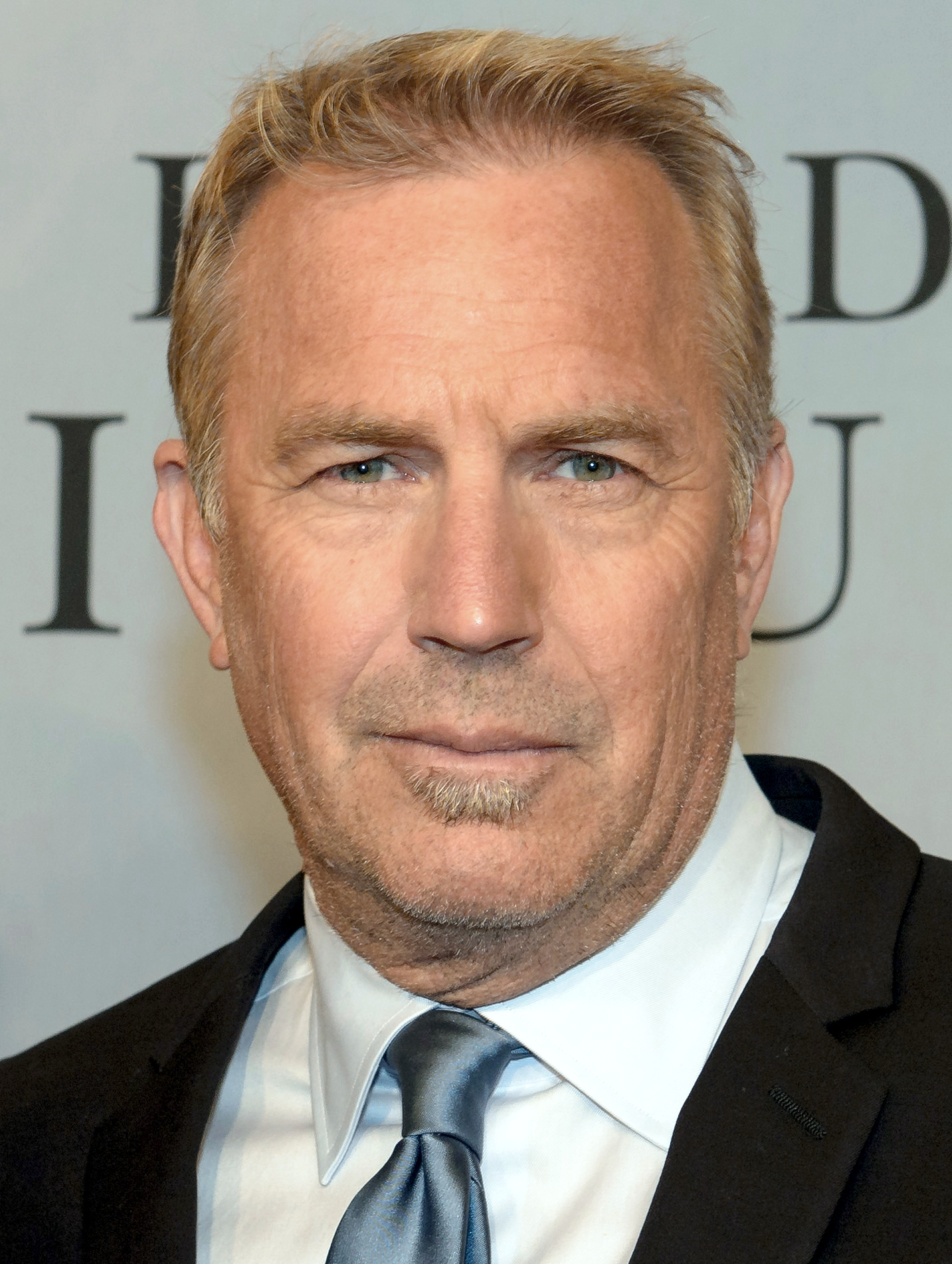
Actor and filmmaker Kevin Costner (BA 1978)

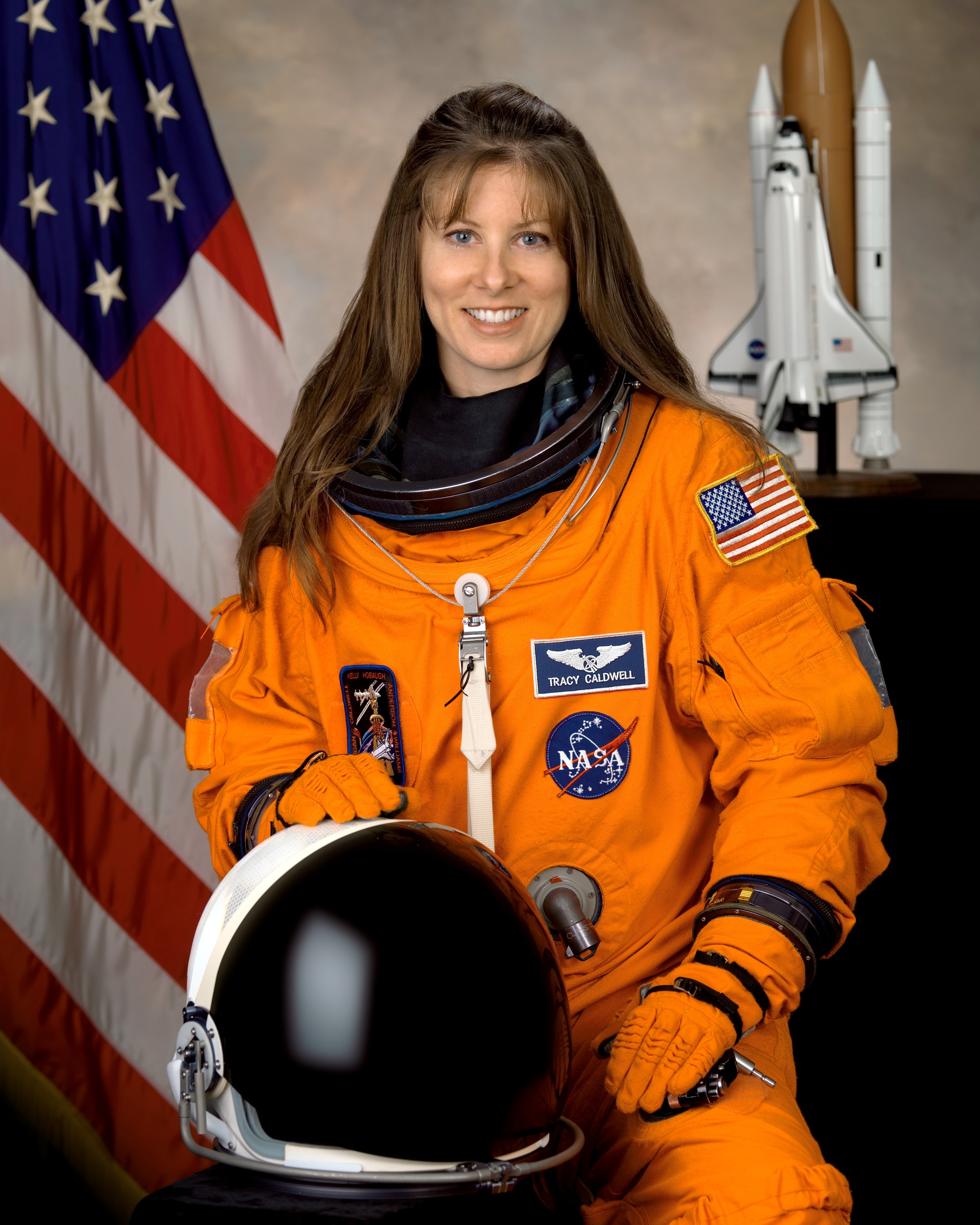
Astronaut Tracy Caldwell Dyson (BS 1993)

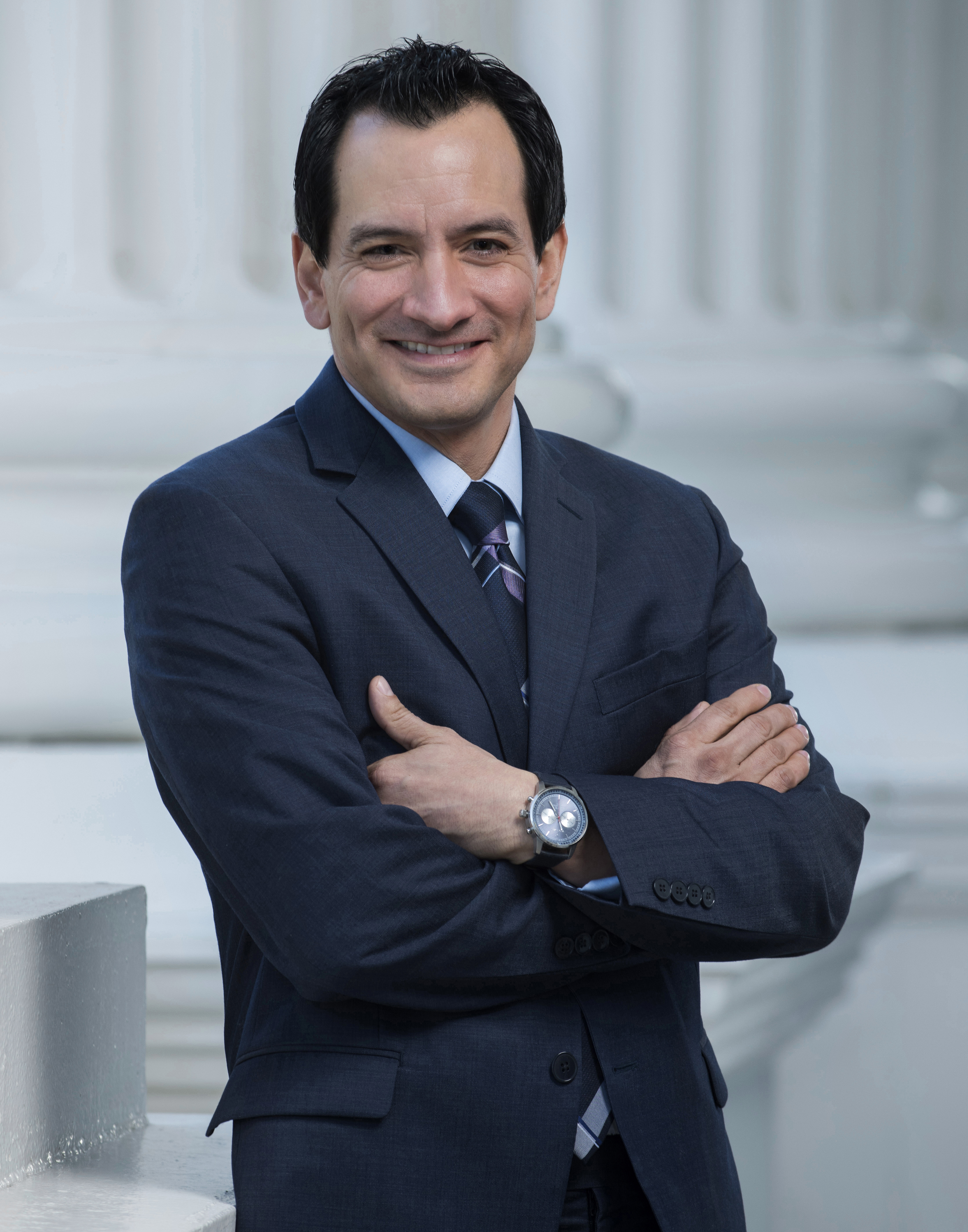
Speaker of the California State Assembly and former professor Anthony Rendon (BA 1992 & MA 1994)

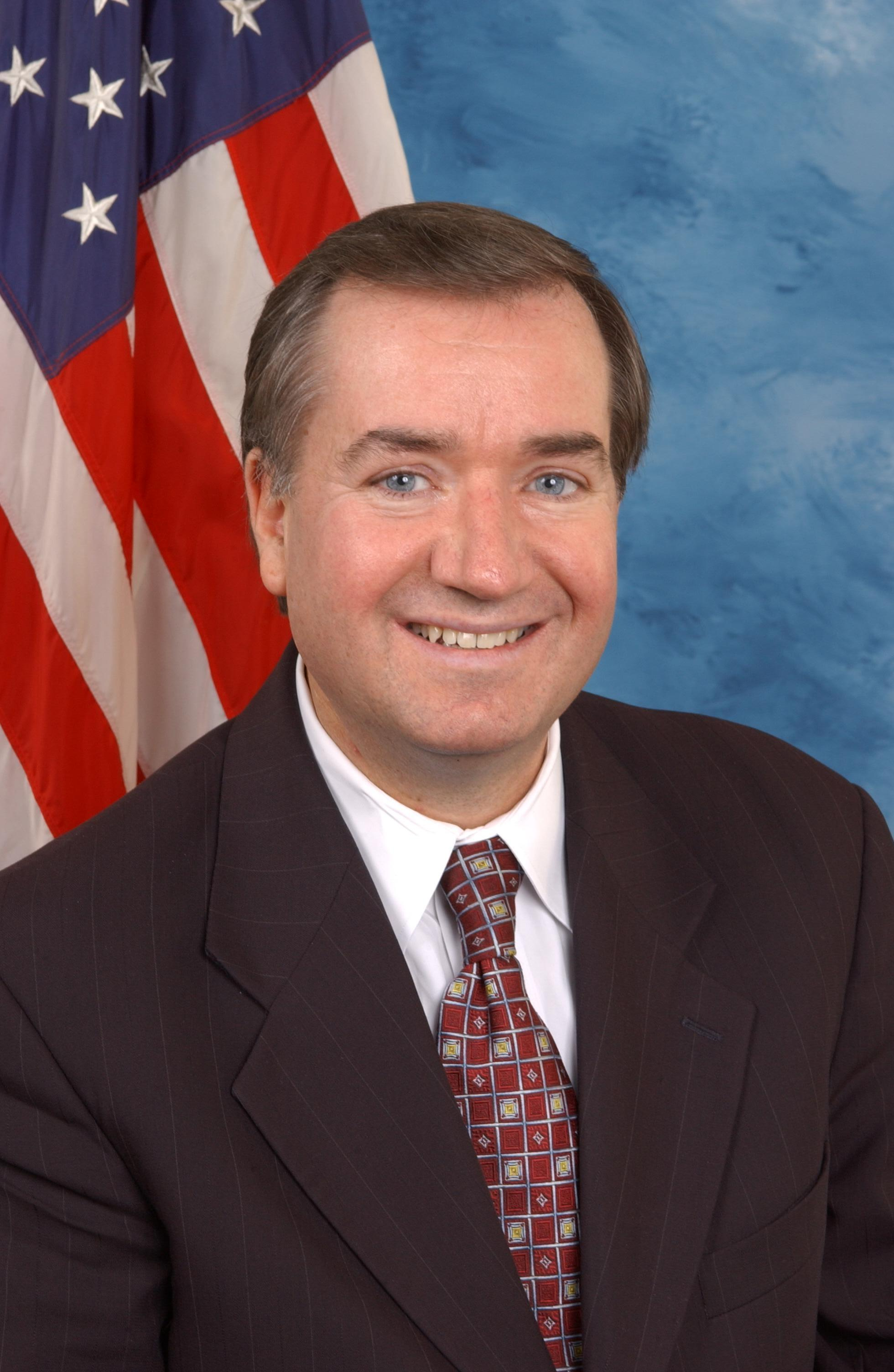
U.S. Representative Ed Royce (BA 1977)

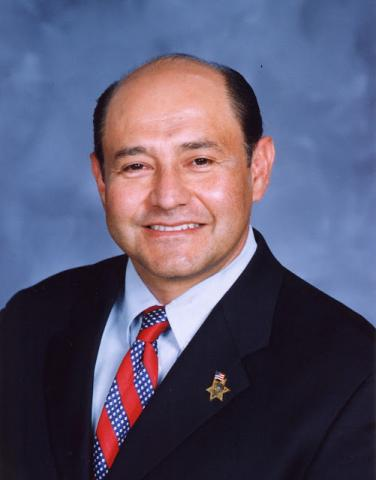
U.S. Representative Lou Correa (BA 1980)

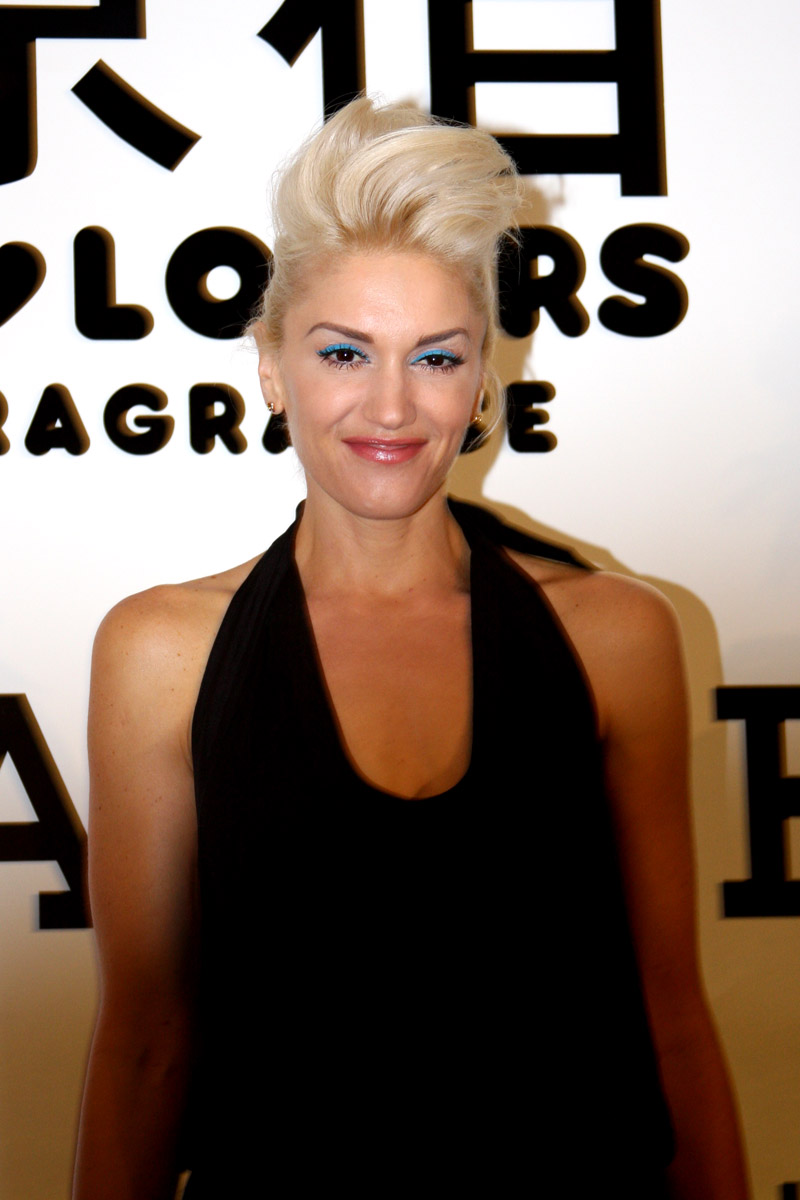
No Doubt lead singer Gwen Stefani

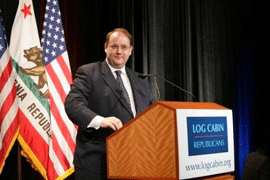
Desperate Housewives creator Marc Cherry (BA 1995)

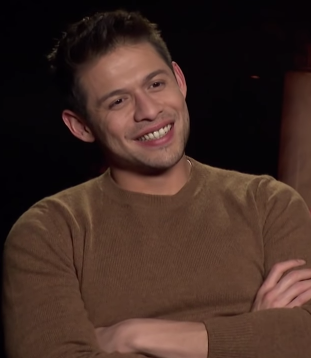
Actor David Castañeda (BA 2015)

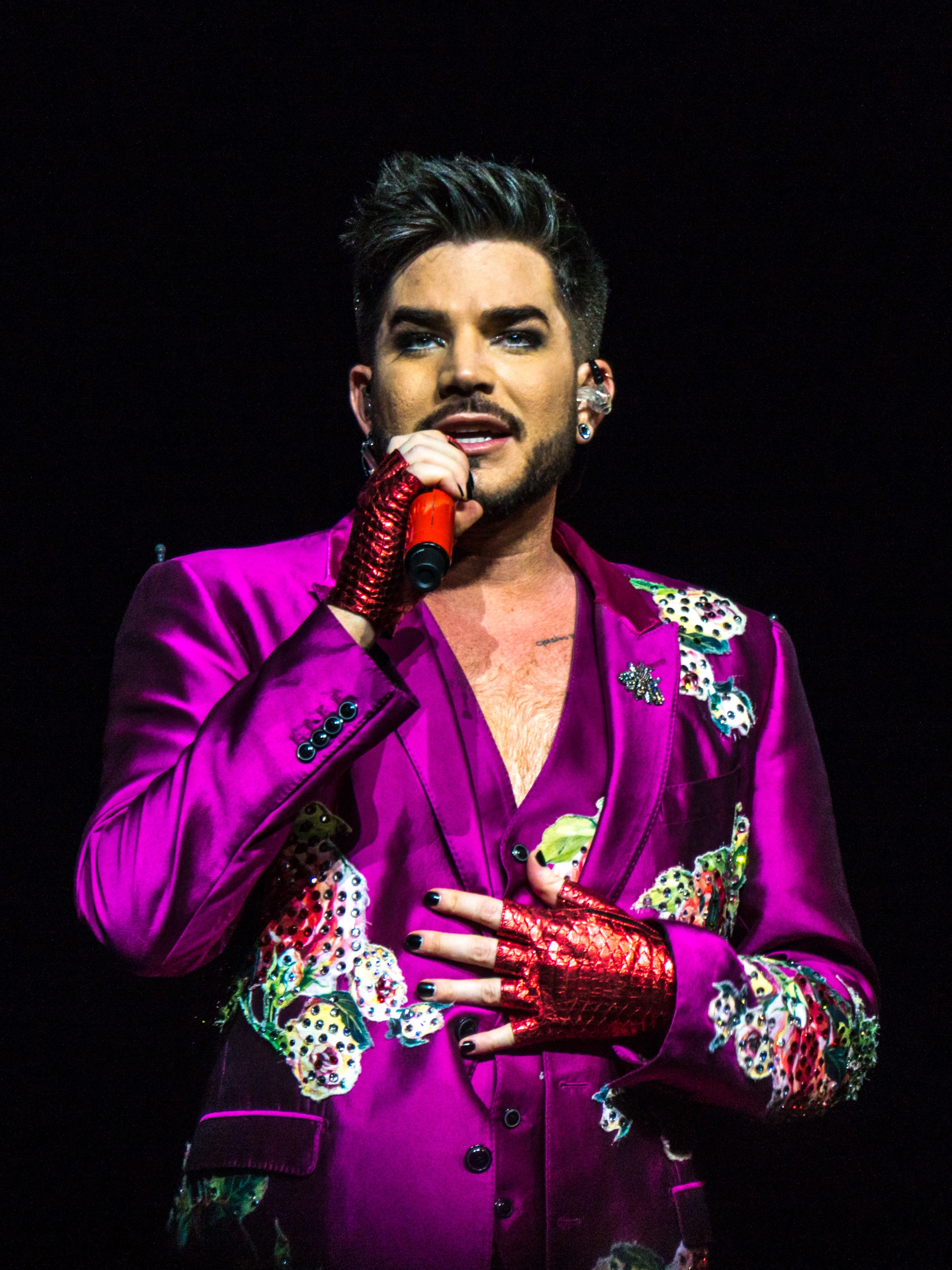
Singer Adam Lambert

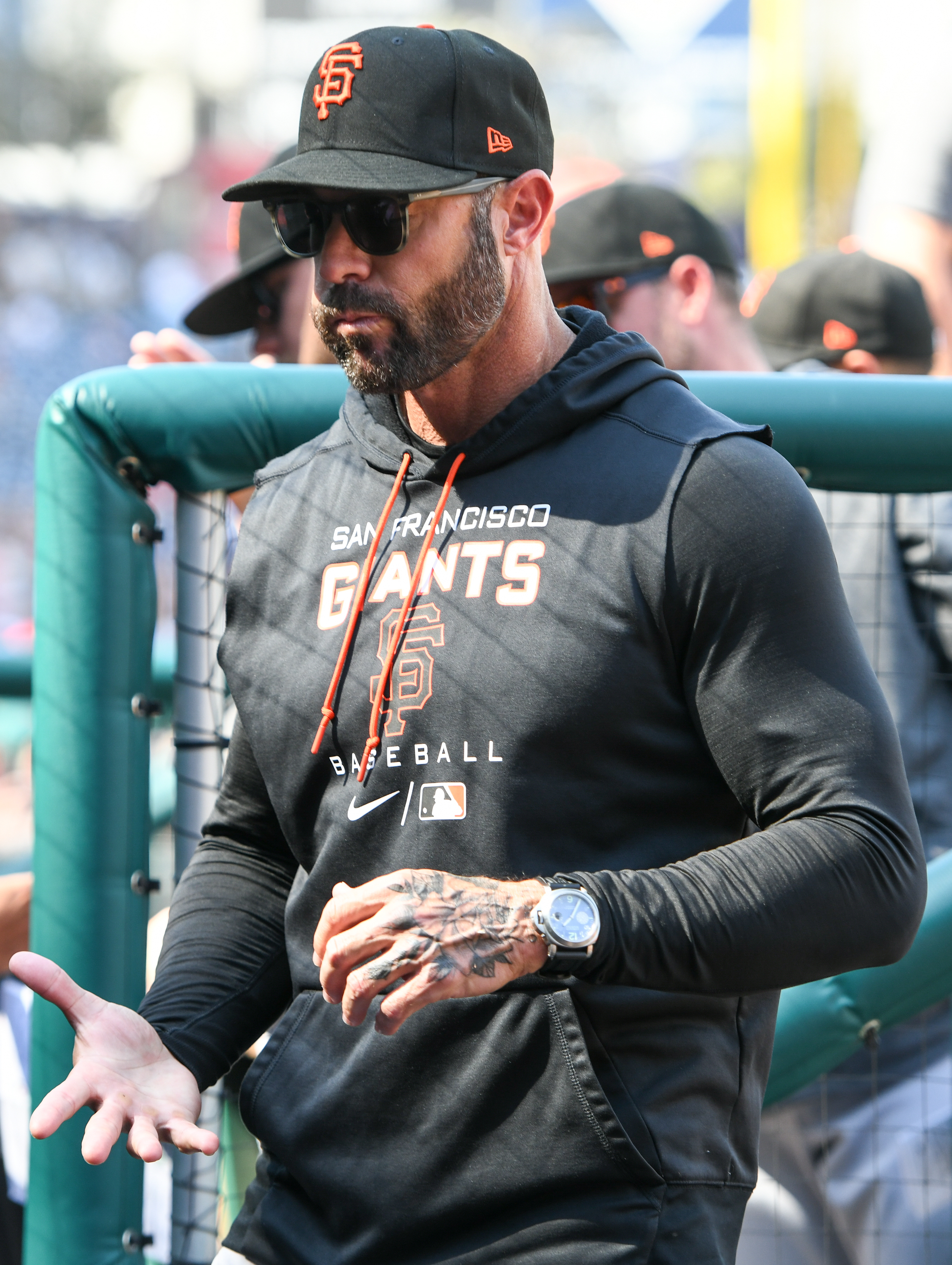
MLB player and manager Gabe Kapler

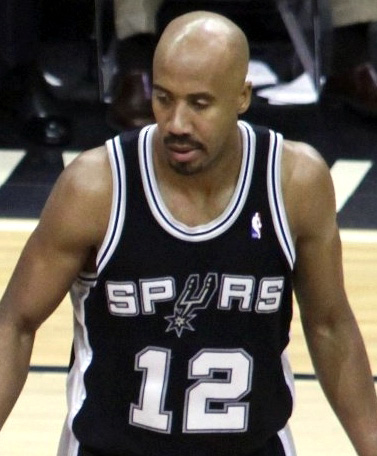
NBA player Bruce Bowen (BA 2006)
