= List of University of Oregon faculty and staff =

This List of University of Oregon faculty and staff includes presidents, staff, and faculty of the University of Oregon.

== Presidents of the University of Oregon ==
The following persons had served as president of the university:

No.	Image	Name	Term start	Term end	Notes	Ref.
1		John Wesley Johnson	1876	1893		
Interim		John Straub	1893	1893		
2		Charles Hiram Chapman	1893	1899		
3		Frank Strong	1899	1902		
4		Prince Lucien Campbell	1902	1925		
5		Arnold Bennett Hall	1926	1932		
6		Clarence Valentine Boyer	1934	1938		
7		Donald M. Erb	1938	1943		
Interim		Orlando John Hollis	1944	1945		
8		Harry K. Newburn	1945	1953		
Interim		Victor Pierpont Morris	1953	1954		
9		O. Meredith Wilson	1954	1960		
Interim		William C. Jones	1960	1961		
10		Arthur S. Flemming	1961	1968		
Interim		Charles Ellicott Johnson	1968	1969		
Interim		N. Ray Hawk	1969	1969		
11		Robert D. Clark	1969	1975		
12		William Beaty Boyd	1975	1980		
13		Paul Olum	1980	1989		
14		Myles Brand	July 1, 1989	June 30, 1994		
15		Dave Frohnmayer	July 1, 1994	June 30, 2009		
16		Richard Lariviere	July 1, 2009	December 2011		
Interim		Robert M. Berdahl	December 9, 2011	July 31, 2012		
17		Michael R. Gottfredson	August 1, 2012	August 6, 2014		
Interim		Scott Coltrane	August 7, 2014	June 30, 2015		
18		Michael H. Schill	July 1, 2015	August 19, 2022		
Interim		Patrick Phillips	August 20, 2022	March 13, 2023		
Interim		Jamie Moffitt	March 14, 2023	June 30, 2023		
19		Karl Scholz	July 1, 2023	present		

== Academic faculty ==
=== Architecture and allied arts ===
Name	Term	Position(s)	Notability	Reference
Keith Eggener		Professor of history of art and architecture	American art and architecture historian	
Arthur Erickson	1954-?	Professor of architecture	Canadian architect	
LaVerne Krause	1966–1986	Professor of Art	Established printmaking program; outstanding contributions as an educator, studio artist, and arts activist; national president of Artists Equity	
Ellis F. Lawrence		Founder and former dean of the School of Architecture and Allied Arts	Architect of Knight Library, Jordan Schnitzer Museum of Art, McArthur Court	
Robert Murase		Former professor of landscape architecture	Landscape architect	

=== Humanities and social sciences ===
Name	Term	Position(s)	Notability	Reference
Henry Alley		Professor emeritus of literature	Author	
A. Aneesh	2022–present	Executive director of the School of Global Studies and Languages at the University of Oregon and a professor of Global Studies and Sociology	Author, sociologist	
Homer Barnett		Professor emeritus of anthropology	Anthropologist	
Judith R. Baskin		Philip H. Knight Professor of Humanities	Religious studies scholar, author	
Robert Berdahl		Former professor of history and dean of the College of Arts and Sciences	President of the Association of American Universities, former president of the University of Texas at Austin, former chancellor of University of California, Berkeley	
Luther Cressman		Founder of the Department of Anthropology, former professor of sociology	Anthropologist	
Edward Diller	1965–1985	Professor of Germanic Languages and Literature	Visiting Fulbright Lecturer to Germany in 1967 and Fulbright grantee	
John Erlandson		Philip H. Knight Professor of Social Sciences	Anthropologist	
Alice Henson Ernst	1924–1950	Professor of English	Playwright, teacher, freelance writer and reporter	
Jon Franklin		Former professor of creative writing	Pulitzer Prize winner (1979 in feature writing, 1985 in explanatory writing)	
Thomas Milton Gatch		Former professor of history and English literature	Former president of University of Washington and Oregon Agricultural College	
Talmy Givón		Professor emeritus of linguistics	Linguist	
Dennis Jenkins†		Co-director of Archaeological Field School	Archaeologist	
Mark Johnson		Philip H. Knight Professor of Liberal Arts and Sciences	Linguist, philosopher	
Barbara Corrado Pope		Professor emerita	Novelist, historian, former director of UO's Clark Honors College, and founding director of Women's and Gender Studies at the university	
Mark Thoma		Professor of Economics	Prominent economics blogger	
Alex Tizon†	?–present	Assistant professor of journalism	Pulitzer Prize winner (1997, Investigative Journalism)	
Steadman Upham		Former vice provost for research, dean of the graduate school, and professor of anthropology	President of the University of Tulsa	
Lois Youngen	1960–1996	Professor emeritus of physical education	Catcher and outfielder in the All-American Girls Professional Baseball League	

=== Law ===
Name	Term	Position(s)	Notability	Reference
Arno H. Denecke		Former professor of law	Former Oregon Supreme Court chief justice	
Dave Frohnmayer		Former dean and professor of law	Former Oregon Supreme Court chief justice	
Wilma Mankiller	2005–2006	Former Wayne Morse Chair of Law and Politics	First female principal chief of the Cherokee Nation	
Wayne Morse		Former dean of the School of Law, former assistant professor of law	Former US senator	
Kenneth J. O'Connell		Former professor of law	Former Oregon Supreme Court chief justice	
Charles Ogletree	2001–2002	Former Wayne Morse Chair of Law and Politics		
David Schuman	1987–1997, 2001	Former associate dean of academic affairs, former professor of law	Current Oregon Court of Appeals judge	
Mary Christina Wood		Philip H. Knight Professor of Law	Director of the University of Oregon School of Law's Environmental and Natural Resources Law Program	

=== Journalism and communication ===
Name	Term	Position(s)	Notability	Reference
Kyu Ho Youm		Professor of journalism	Journalism and communication law scholar	

=== Music and dance ===
Name	Term	Position(s)	Notability	Reference
David Crumb		Assistant professor of composition	Composer	
Robert Kyr		Philip H. Knight Professor of Composition and Theory	Composer	

=== Natural sciences ===
Name	Term	Position(s)	Notability	Reference
James E. Brau		Philip H. Knight Professor of Natural Science; director, Center for High Energy Physics	High energy particle physicist; ATLAS experiment, Large Hadron Collider, CERN; LIGO; International Linear Collider	
Carlos Bustamante		Former professor of chemistry	Molecular biologist	
Patrick G. Carrick		Former director of the Shared Laser Facility		
Katharine Cashman		Former Philip H. Knight Professor of Natural Science	Geologist, vulcanologist	
Thomas Condon		Former professor of Geology	Geologist and paleontologist	
Russell Donnelly	1966–1972; 1982–1983	Former Physics Department chair; retired professor of Physics	Physicist renowned in the field of low temperature physics	
Sarah Ann Douglas		Professor emerita of Computer & Information Science	Known for her pioneering research in human-computer interaction; elected to European Academy of Sciences, June 2002	
Jon Driver	1990–1991	Former visiting assistant professor of Psychology		
Ira Herskowitz	1972–1981	Former professor at the Institute of Molecular Biology	Geneticist	
Stephen Hsu		Former professor of theoretical physics	Co-founder of SafeWeb	
Ray Hyman		Professor emeritus of psychology	One of the founders of the modern skeptical movement	
Ramesh Jasti	2014–present	Professor of chemistry	First organic chemist to synthesize the elusive cycloparaphenylene	
Eugene Luks		Professor emeritus of computer science	Known for his research on the graph isomorphism problem and on algorithms for computational group theory	
Stephanie A. Majewski		Assistant professor of physics	Experimental high energy particle physics; Department of Energy Early Career Research award	
Brian Matthews		Professor emeritus of physics	Biochemist, biophysicist	
Helen Neville	1995–present	Professor of psychology and neuroscience	Neuroscientist	
Ivan M. Niven		Former professor of mathematics	Number theorist; former president of the Mathematics Association of America	
Aaron Novick		Founder of the Institute of Molecular Biology	Member of the Manhattan Project	
Michael Posner		Professor emeritus of neuroscience	Neuroscientist; member of National Academy of Sciences; National Medal of Science	
Gregory Retallack	1981–2022	Professor emeritus of Earth Sciences	Paleopedologist, wrote the book on fossil soils	
Geraldine Richmond	1985–present	Professor of Chemistry	Chemist, Recipient of the National Medal of Science	
Paul Slovic		Professor of psychology	Judgement and decision making	
Davison Soper		Professor of Physics	J. J. Sakurai Prize for Theoretical Particle Physics, is presented by the American Physical Society	
Franklin Stahl		Professor emeritus of biology	Conducted Meselson–Stahl experiment in 1958	
William H. Starbuck		Professor of management	Cognitive psychologist on organizational behavior	
George Streisinger		Former professor of biology	First person to clone a vertebrate (1981)	
Joseph Thornton	2002–2012	Former professor of biology	Evolutionary biologist	
Leona E. Tyler		Former dean of the graduate school and former professor of psychology	Former president of the American Psychological Association	
Marie A. Vitulli	1976–2011	Professor emerita of mathematics	Commutative algebraist; fellow of the American Mathematical Society and the Association for Women in Mathematics	
Roger J. Williams		Former professor of chemistry	Discovered pantothenic acid; former president of the American Chemical Society	
David J. Wineland	2017–present	Research professor	Nobel Prize laureate in physics, 2012	

== Athletic staff ==
Name	Term	Position(s)	Notability	Reference
Dana Altman		Current basketball head coach	‡	
Mike Bellotti		Former athletic director, football head coach, and offensive coordinator	‡ESPN analyst	
Bill Bowerman†		Former track and field head coach	‡	
Rich Brooks		Former football head coach	‡Former football head coach of the Kentucky Wildcats	
Gary Crowton		Former football offensive coordinator	Former head coach of BYU	
Bill Dellinger†		Former track and field head coach	‡	
Dick Harter		Former basketball head coach	Former head coach of the Charlotte Hornets	
Bill Hayward		Former track and field coach, former athletic director	‡Former Olympic coach	
Howard Hobson		Former basketball head coach	‡	
George Horton		Baseball head coach	‡Former baseball head coach of the Cal State Fullerton Titans	
Chip Kelly		Former football head coach, former offensive coordinator	‡	
Ernie Kent†		Former basketball head coach	‡	
Dirk Koetter		Former football offensive coordinator	Former football head coach of the Arizona State Sun Devils	
Vin Lananna		Associate athletic director and track and field head coach	‡Former track and field head coach of the Stanford Cardinal	
Harry Marra		Assistant track and field head coach	‡Former track and field head coach of the San Francisco State Gators, personal coach for Ashton Eaton (decathlon and indoor heptathlon world record holder, double Olympic gold medalist, now special consultant for Indonesia	
Chris Petersen		Former wide receivers coach	Football head coach of the Boise State Broncos	
George Seifert		Former assistant football coach	Former football head coach of the San Francisco 49ers	
Jeff Tedford		Former football offensive coordinator	Football head coach of the California Golden Bears	

== Notes ==
† Also an alumnus of the University of Oregon
‡ Notability inherent within the position at the University of Oregon

== See also ==
- List of University of Oregon alumni
- Oregon Ducks
- Lists of Oregon-related topics
