= Glenn Stanton =

American architect (1895–1969)

- Born: May 17, 1895; Humboldt, Iowa
- Died: October 16, 1969 (aged 74); Portland, Oregon
- Occupation: Architect

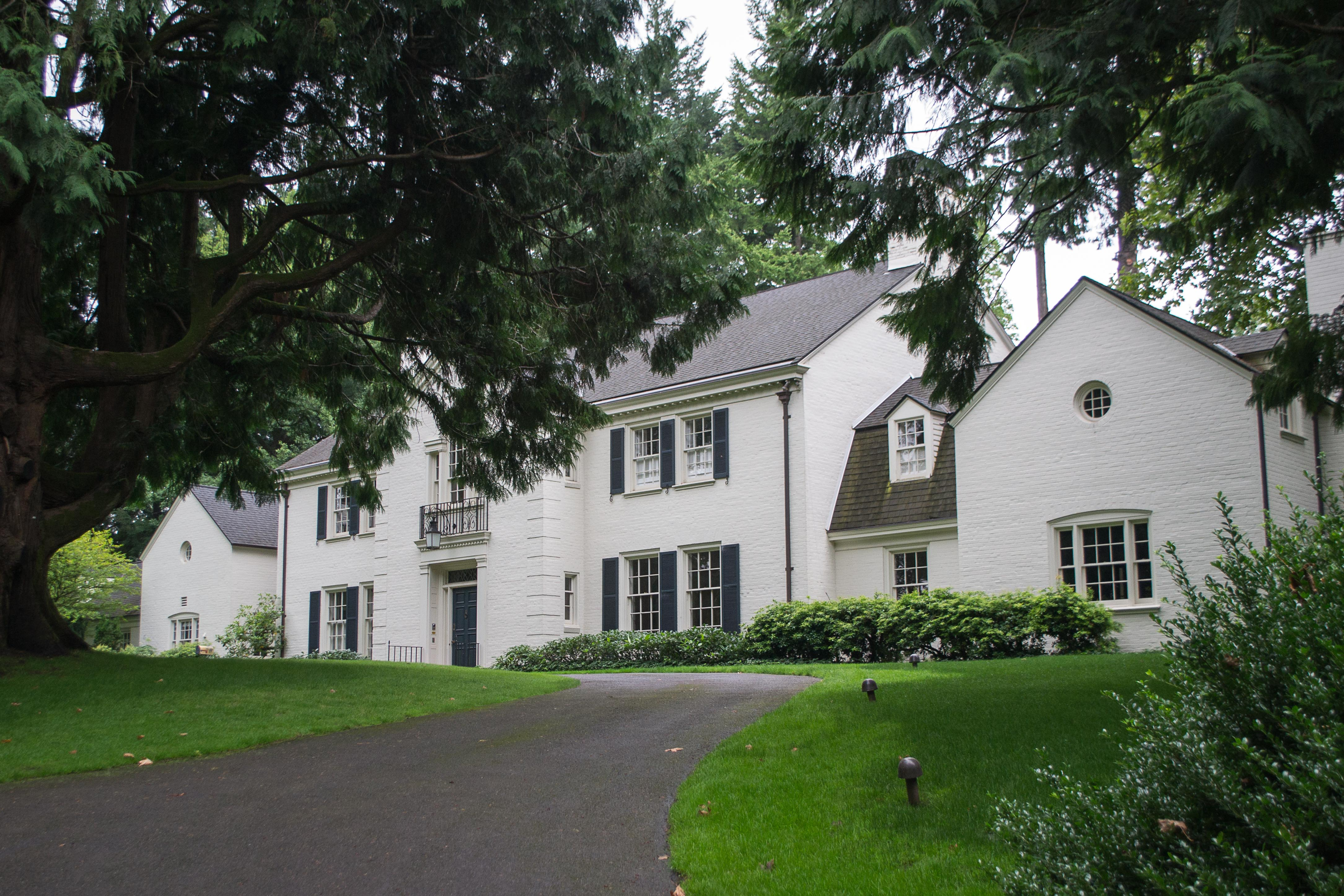
The Ernest Haycox estate in Portland, built in 1940.

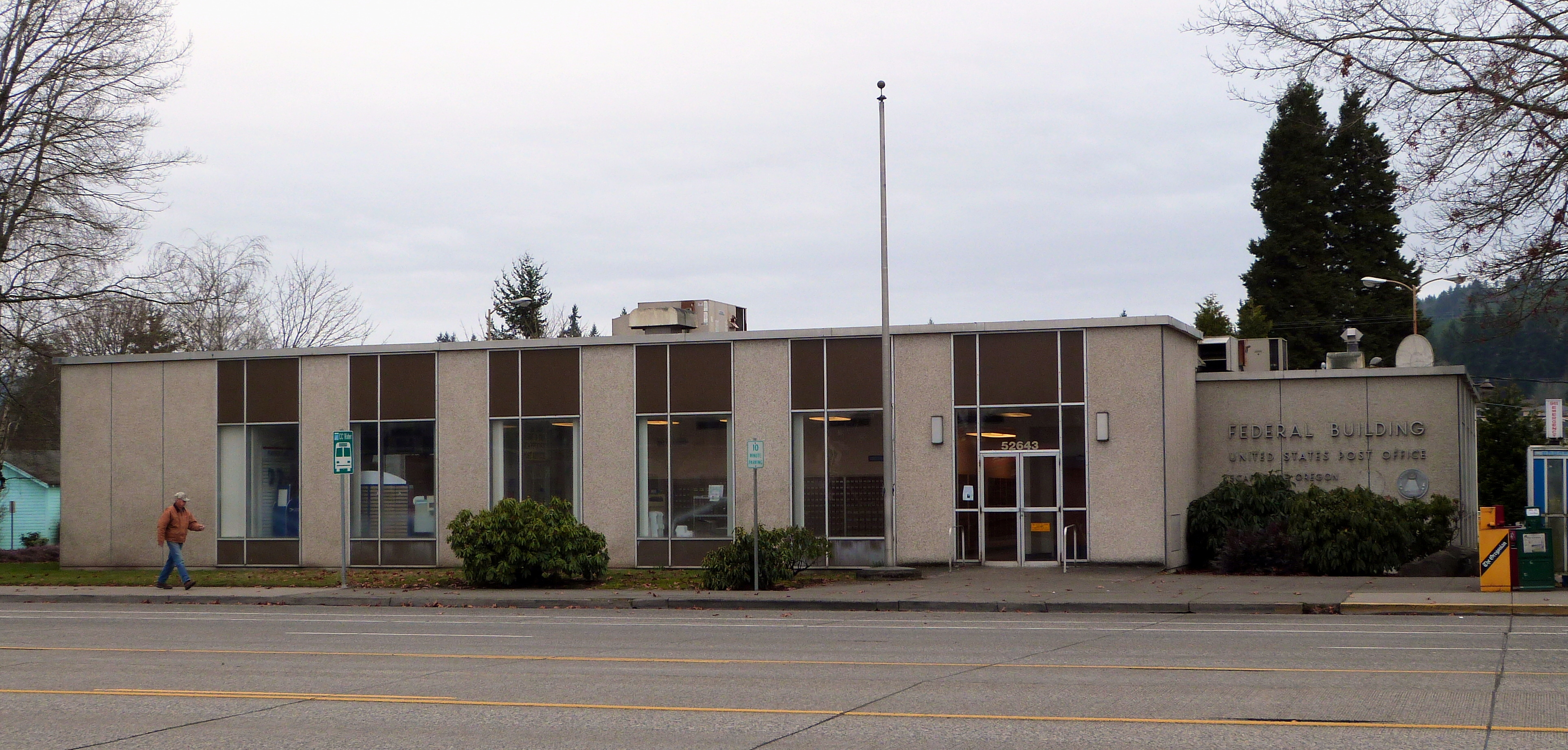
The United States Post Office in Scappoose, built in 1966.

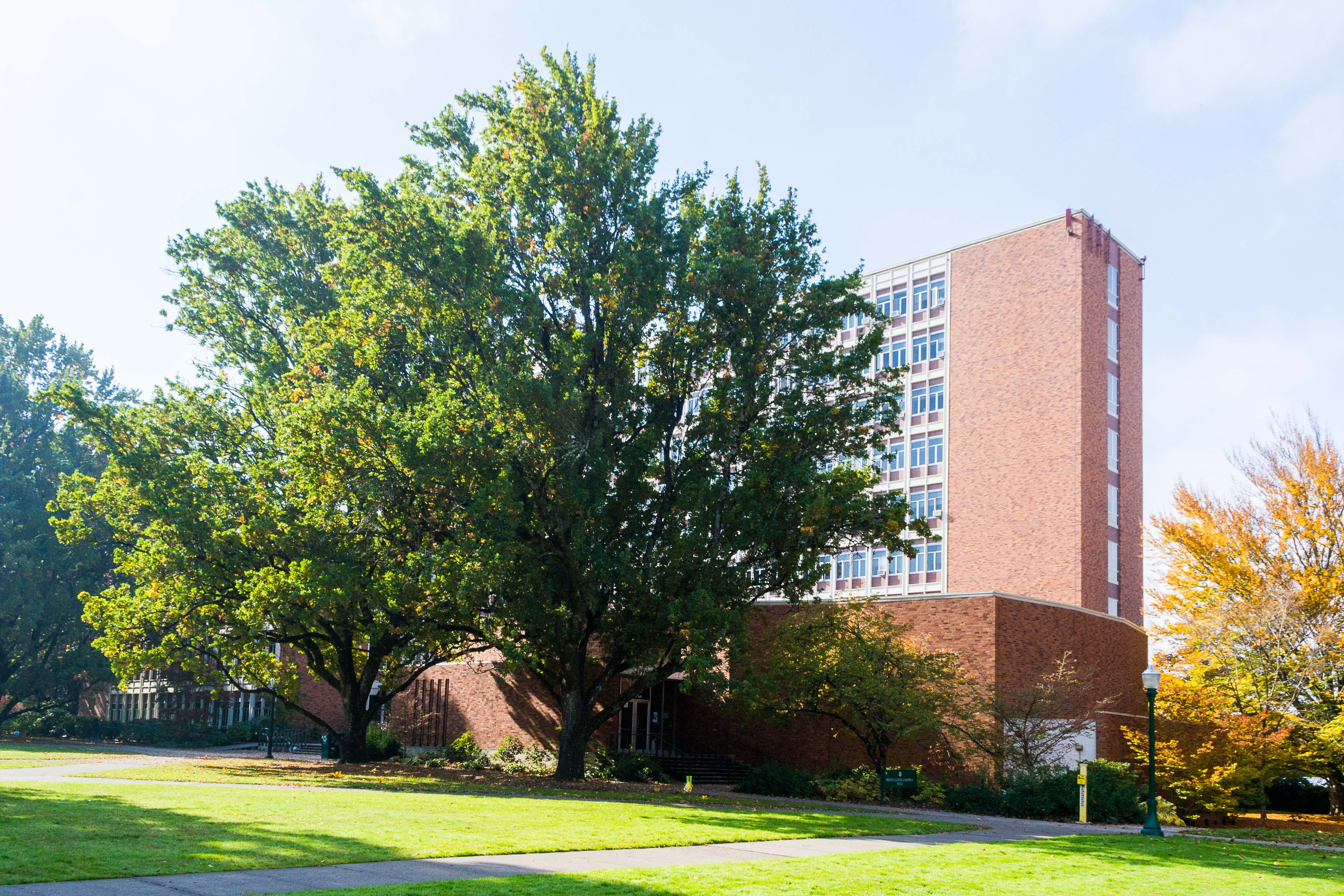
Prince Lucien Campbell Hall of the University of Oregon, completed in 1968.

Glenn Stanton (1895–1969) was an American architect in practice in Portland, Oregon, from 1925 until 1969. From 1951 to 1953 he was president of the American Institute of Architects.

== Life and career ==
Arthur Glenn Stanton was born May 17, 1895, in Humboldt, Iowa. He was raised in Portland, where he attended the public schools. He was educated at the University of Oregon, graduating in 1917. His graduate studies were interrupted by World War I, and he spent part of 1918 and 1919 in Europe with the United States Army. He finished his degree later in 1919, and after further studies at the Massachusetts Institute of Technology he spent the summer of 1921 back in Europe, where he assisted in rebuilding programs. In 1922 he returned to Portland, where he joined the office of Morris H. Whitehouse, a leading regional architect, as a drafter. In 1925 he and another employee, Walter E. Church, were made principals in the firm, which in 1931 was renamed Whitehouse, Stanton & Church. Stanton left in 1935 to open his own office. During World War II Stanton, in association with Hollis Johnston, was architect of many defense related projects, including extensive wartime housing projects and the Minidoka War Relocation Center, a Japanese internment camp, built in 1942. After practicing under his own name for twenty years, in 1955 he formed the firm of Stanton, Boles, Maguire & Church, bringing into the partnership several long-time associates. He practiced as the head of this firm until his death.

Stanton joined the American Institute of Architects in 1926 as a member of the Oregon chapter. He served as chapter president for the year 1939–40, and was elected a national vice president in 1948. In 1949 he was elevated to Fellow, the organization's highest membership honor, and was elected president in 1951, succeeding Ralph Thomas Walker. He was reelected in 1952.

== Personal life and death ==
Stanton never married. He died October 16, 1969, in Portland.

== Legacy ==
At least two of Stanton's works have been listed on the United States National Register of Historic Places, and others contribute to listed historic districts.

== Architectural works ==
- Ernest Haycox estate, 4700 SW Humphrey Blvd, Portland, Oregon (1940, NRHP 1994)
- Newberry Building, 600 SW 5th Ave, Portland, Oregon (1951)
- Withycombe Hall, Oregon State University, Corvallis, Oregon (1951)
- Mount Tabor Middle School, 5800 SE Ash St, Portland, Oregon (1952)
- Executive Building, 811 SW 6th Ave, Portland, Oregon (1956)
- First National Bank Building, 400 SW 6th Ave, Portland, Oregon (1957–60)
- YWCA of Greater Portland (former), 1111 SW 10th Ave, Portland, Oregon (1958)
- Dammasch State Hospital, Wilsonville, Oregon (1960, demolished)
- Marshall High School, 3905 SE 91st Ave, Portland, Oregon (1961)
- Prince Lucien Campbell Hall, University of Oregon, Eugene, Oregon (1962–68)
- United States Post Office, 52643 Columbia River Hwy, Scappoose, Oregon (1966, NRHP 2017)
- Keller Auditorium, 222 SW Clay St, Portland, Oregon (1967–68)
