= Youm =

Youm is a surname. Notable people with the surname include:

- Kyu Ho Youm (fl. from 1982), professor
- Thierno Youm (born 1960), Senegalese footballer
- Youm Jung-hwan (1985–2014), South Korean cyclist
- Youm Kyoung-youb (born 1968), South Korean baseball player and manager
