= Sarah Douglas =

Sarah Douglas may refer to:

- Sarah Douglas (actress) (born 1952), British actress
- Sarah Douglas (sailor) (born 1991), Canadian sailor
- Sarah Ann Douglas (born 1944), computer scientist

== See also ==
- Sarah Douglass (disambiguation)
