= Websafe =

Websafe or Web-safe may refer to:

- Websafe colors, a palette of colors intended to be displayable on 256-color displays without dithering
- Websafe fonts, fonts used because they are likely to be present on a wide variety of computer systems

== See also ==
- SafeWeb, a software that identifies malicious websites
- Web browser safety, protection for web browsers
- Web of trust, a concept in cryptography
- Cyber safe, safety aspects in the internet
