= Swetland Building =

Historic building in Portland, Oregon, U.S.

- U.S. National Register of Historic Places
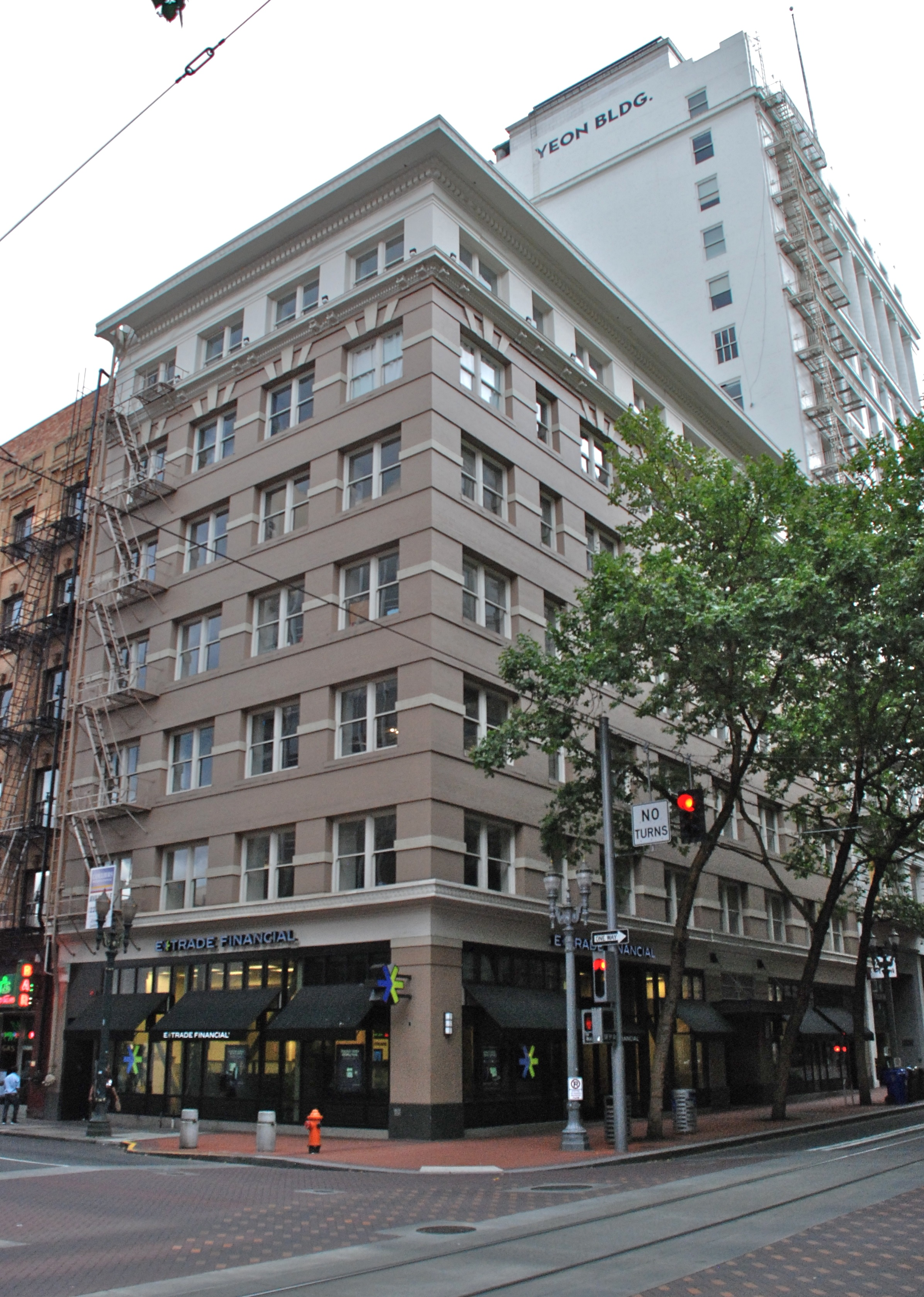
- The building's exterior in 2012

- Location within Portland, Oregon Location within Oregon Location within the United States
- Location: 500 SW 5th Avenue; Portland, Oregon
- Coordinates: 45°31′12″N 122°40′36″W
- Area: less than one acre
- Built: 1907
- Architect: Emil Schacht
- Architectural style: Early Commercial
- MPS: Downtown Portland, Oregon MPS
- NRHP reference No.: 07000367
- Added to NRHP: April 24, 2007

The Swetland Building is a building located in downtown Portland, Oregon, listed on the National Register of Historic Places.

== History ==
Camera World was headquartered in the building from 1977 until the late-1990s, with its retail store occupying the ground floor at SW 5th and Washington until 1995, when it moved to the 400 SW Sixth Avenue building. The company's administrative offices and mail-order operations remained on other floors until at least 1997.

== See also ==
- National Register of Historic Places listings in Southwest Portland, Oregon
