= Cameranu =

Dutch retailer of photo and video equipment

- Type: Subsidiary
- Industry: Retail
- Founded: 2003
- Founders: Johan van Slooten; Wilco de Vries
- Headquarters: Urk, Flevoland, Netherlands
- Number of locations: 8 (2026)
- Area served: Benelux, European Union
- Key people: Ricardo van den Burg (CEO)
- Products: Cameras, lenses, video equipment, accessories
- Services: Equipment rental, sensor cleaning, workshops
- Number of employees: 200 (2026)
- Parent: European Imaging Group
- Website: www.cameranu.nl

Cameranu (formerly CameraNU.nl) is a Dutch retailer of photographic and video equipment headquartered in Urk, Netherlands. Founded in 2003 by Johan van Slooten and Wilco de Vries, the company operates physical stores in the Netherlands and Belgium and sells products online within the European Union. Since 2022, Cameranu has been part of the European Imaging Group (EIG), a subsidiary of AURELIUS.

== History ==
Cameranu was founded in 2003 by Johan van Slooten and Wilco de Vries in Urk, Netherlands. In 2007, the company opened a retail store and warehouse in Urk.

Cameranu expanded its retail operations in 2017 through partnerships with CameraTools in Apeldoorn and City Foto in Eindhoven. In 2019, the company acquired Foto Booms in Amsterdam, its first store outside Urk.

In 2021, Cameranu opened a store in Rotterdam. In January 2022, EIG, a subsidiary of AURELIUS, acquired a majority stake in CameraNU.nl B.V. from its founders. The acquisition was completed in February 2022. Following the acquisition, Cameranu integrated several former Calumet Photographic stores in the Netherlands into its retail network. The stores were subsequently rebranded as Cameranu locations, with some later consolidated with existing stores in the same cities or relocated to new premises.

In March 2023, the company rebranded from CameraNU.nl to Cameranu and introduced a new visual identity. In 2024, Cameranu opened stores in Antwerp and Utrecht. In 2025, EIG acquired the remaining shares in the company from its founders.

As of 2026, Cameranu operates eight physical stores: Urk (headquarters), Amsterdam, Rotterdam, Groningen, Apeldoorn, Eindhoven, Utrecht, and Antwerp (Belgium). The company employs approximately 200 people.

== Operations ==
Cameranu retails photographic and video equipment, including cameras, lenses, lighting equipment, and accessories from manufacturers such as DJI, Fujifilm, Hasselblad, Canon, Nikon, Sony, Panasonic, and Leica. The company also offers second-hand trade-in services, sensor cleaning, photography workshops, and leasing.

Cameranu operates primarily in the Netherlands and Belgium and sells products online within the European Union.

== Ownership and management ==
Johan van Slooten and Wilco de Vries led Cameranu from its founding in 2003 until the acquisition of the company by EIG. In January 2022, EIG, backed by AURELIUS, acquired a majority stake in Cameranu. The remaining shares were acquired in 2025. Ricardo van den Burg became CEO in 2025.

== Awards and recognition ==
Cameranu has received multiple awards from Dutch retail and consumer organisations, including Shopping Awards in the photography and electronics category on a recurring basis since 2019.

The company has also been recognised in the Website van het Jaar competition organised by Emerce and Multiscope in the Consumer Electronics category in multiple years, including 2021 through 2025.

In addition, the company has been recognised in Dutch retail industry awards such as Retailer of the Year and Beste Winkelketen van Nederland in recent years.
