= Prince Lucien Campbell =

American academic and university president

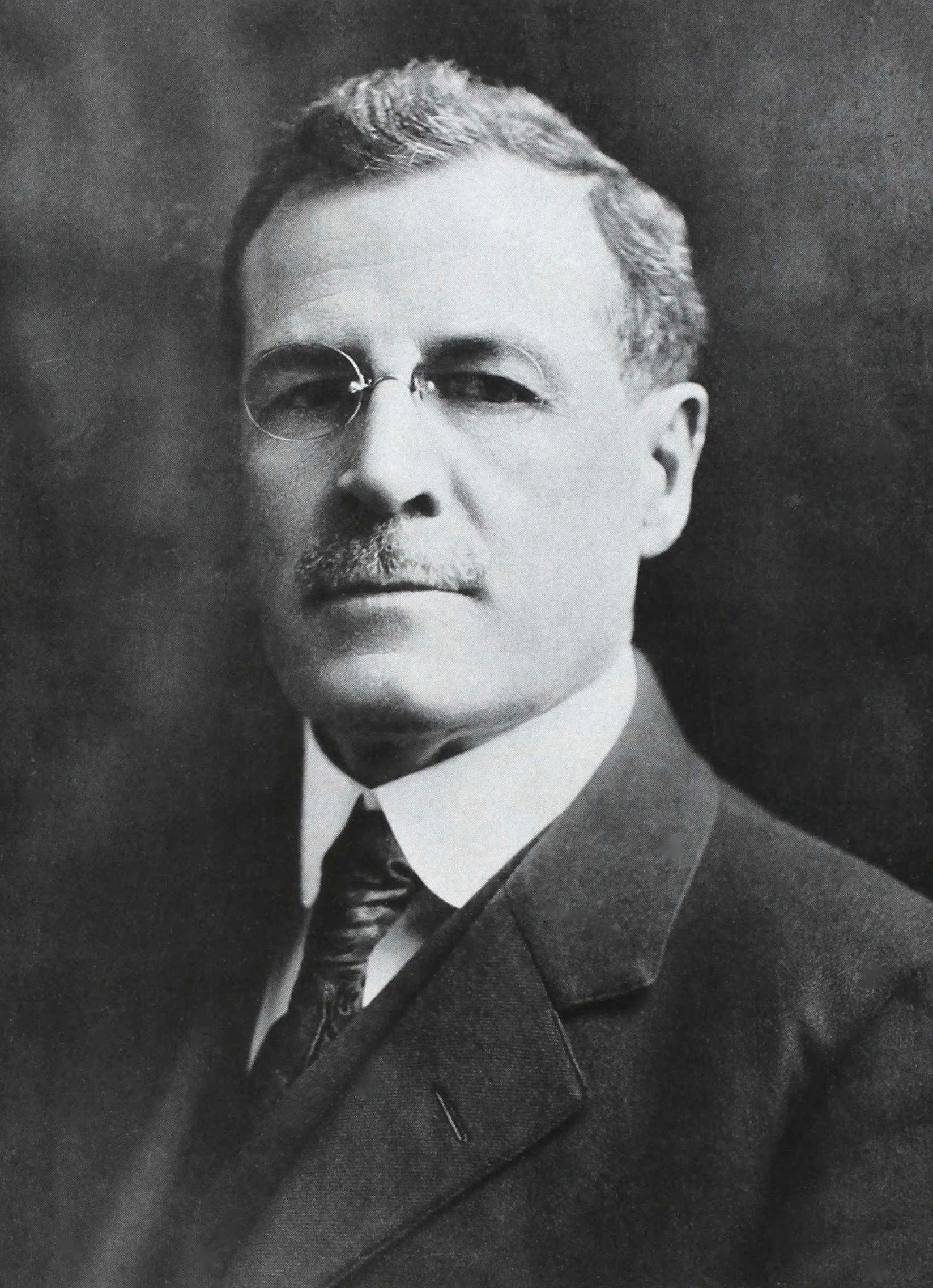
- Portrait of President Campbell from Oregana, 1922 yearbook of University of Oregon
- Born: October 6, 1861; Newmarket, Missouri
- Died: August 24, 1925 (aged 63); Eugene, Oregon
- Occupation: University administrator
- Title: President

Academic background
- Education: Harvard College

Academic work
- Discipline: Classics

Prince Lucien Campbell (1861–1925) was an American academic who served as the fourth president of the University of Oregon from 1902–1925. Educated at Christian College in Monmouth, he graduated from Harvard College in 1886. He was president of the Oregon State Normal School in Monmouth, Oregon, a precursor of Western Oregon University, from 1890–1902.

As president of the University of Oregon, he led expansion of financial and physical resources, increased student enrollment, and developed the university's curricular offerings by establishing multiple new departments and programs.

== Early life and education ==
Prince Lucien Campbell was born October 6, 1861, in Newmarket, Missouri, of Scottish ancestry. He was the son of Thomas Franklin Campbell and Jane Eliza Campbell. His father, Rev. Campbell, was a minister of the Christian Church in Oregon and California, and from 1870–1879 was president of Christian College in Monmouth, Oregon. Prince Lucien Campbell enrolled there, and at age 18 had graduated from Christian College. He taught school for three years before entering Harvard as a sophomore. After his junior year he worked as a reporter for 14 months at the Kansas City Star. He returned to Harvard, earning an Artium Baccalaureatum degree in 1886.

In 1887 Campbell married Eugenia Zieber, who died in 1891. They had two children, Herbert Morris, who died in infancy, and Lucia Eugenia. In 1908 Campbell married Susan A. Campbell, eponym of UO's Susan Campbell Hall. Susan's son Walter Church was among the first graduates in 1917 of UO's School of Architecture and Allied Arts, and supervisor of the construction of the capitol building in Salem.

== Career ==
After graduating from Harvard, Prince Lucien Campbell returned to Monmouth in 1886. He became a professor of classics for three years at his alma mater, the former Christian College, which in 1882 had been designated by the Oregon Legislative Assembly as Oregon State Normal School (OSNS).

Campbell was an organizer and director of Polk County Bank in Monmouth. In 1890 he became the bank's vice president and manager.

In 1890 Prince Lucien Campbell also became president of OSNS, the same institution his father had served as president when it was Christian College, and that is now Western Oregon University. His task at OSNS was to encourage "the conservative faculty of Christian College to accept the new ideas developed by the normal school leadership."

In 1902 he was elected the fourth president of the University of Oregon, where he served until his death in 1925. Campbell is credited with leadership in securing financial resources and building new facilities, as well as expanding the curriculum of the University of Oregon. He secured state funding through a state property millage tax, a percentage of property taxes dedicated to the university, and through a gift campaign program of private contributions. During his presidency the university's annual budget increased from US$47,500 to US$966,000, and enrollment increased from 250 students to 3,000 students.

One of his key hires was Ellis F. Lawrence, founder of the School of Architecture and Allied Arts, who designed many buildings on campus. Over Campbell's 23-year tenure, he led efforts establishing the schools of music, education, journalism, architecture and allied arts, business administration, sociology, and physical education.

== Honors and tributes ==
Both Pacific University and the University of Colorado awarded Campbell honorary doctorates.

Campbell was "noted for his devotion to building esprit-de-corps within the university", and for treating all faculty with equal respect, regardless of rank.

Upon Campbell's death, Governor Walter M. Pierce commented, "He was a hard student, a clear thinker, and always displayed a wonderful degree of tact in dealing with people of all classes."

The day following his death on August 24, 1925, the Eugene Guard carried an editorial page tribute to Campbell, which said in part:

He was unusual... Nature had given him the combination of a great intellectuality, a marvelous magnetic personality, a tireless energy, and withall a quality of personal humility and sef-immolation as rare as it is splendid... He believed in the rising generation as the hope of the land, and his faith in that generation never faltered... His whole active life was spent in the advancement of education, culture, and progress in Oregon.

The oldest public building in Oregon, Campbell Hall on the campus of Western Oregon University, was formally named in 1936 in honor of its second and fourth presidents, Rev. Thomas Franklin Campbell and his son Prince Lucien Campbell. Prince Lucien Campbell Hall (abbreviated "PLC") is the only high-rise University of Oregon building, the tallest on campus.

== See also ==
- Presidents of the University of Oregon
