= Prince Lucien Campbell Hall =

Building at the University of Oregon, USA

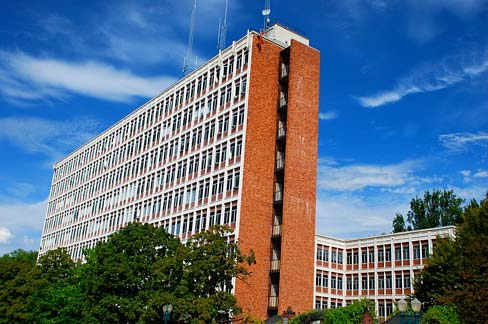
- 44°2′39.6″N 123°4′42.1″W
- Interactive map of the Prince Lucien Campbell Hall area
- Alternative names: PLC

General information
- Type: High rise
- Architectural style: Modernist; International Style
- Location: University of Oregon campus, 1415 Kincaid St, Eugene, Oregon 97403

Design and construction
- Architects: Glenn Stanton; Keith Robert Maguire
- Architecture firm: Stanton, Boles, Maguire & Church

Prince Lucien Campbell Hall (PLC) is a high rise building on the University of Oregon (UO) campus in Eugene, Oregon, USA. Named for Prince Lucien Campbell, the fourth president of the university, PLC houses classrooms, staff offices, and an auditorium.

== Description ==
PLC is a modernist high rise building located on Kincaid street, on the west side of the university's Memorial Quadrangle (Jordan Schnitzer Museum, Knight Library, Chapman Hall, Condon Hall). PLC consists of a five-story core building on the south end, a ten-story west wing, and an auditorium on the north side. PLC rises 108 feet above ground, and it was the tallest structure on campus until the construction of the 159-foot tower at Hayward Field in 2020.

The architecture firm Stanton, Boles, Maguire & Church planned PLC to be built in two stages, with construction between 1962 and 1968. Architects Glenn Stanton and Keith Robert Maguire, both graduates of UO's architecture program, designed Prince Lucien Campbell Hall to provide office space for faculty on a small footprint. According to the UO Library description, however, "The high-rise urban character of PLC did not set a trend... Colored tile attempts to harmonize the structure with surrounding older buildings on the Memorial Quadrangle." The Oregon Companion described PLC as "...a pugnaciously ugly eight-story semi-skyscraper office building".

== History ==
In April 1962 the Oregon State Board of Education approved naming the new building in honor of Prince Lucien Campbell, the university's fourth president, who served between 1902 and 1925. The state also approved contracts for general construction work by Purvis Construction Co., Spokane; mechanical work by Urban Plumbing & Heating Co., Portland; and electrical work by L. H. Morris Electric Co., Eugene.

In 1963, a core unit of five stories, and two stories of the west wing, were completed. In September 1963, faculty in "English, history, and sociology departments, the institute of community studies, and parts of other departments" had moved into new offices in PLC. The building was dedicated during the 1964 homecoming weekend.

By October 1966, the university was constructing the $3 million 8-story addition to the west wing of PLC, as well as the auditorium unit. Both were completed in 1968.

At 9:15 p.m. on October 4, 1970, approximately 20 to 24 sticks of dynamite on a timer were exploded in a ground floor restroom, breaking plumbing pipes and causing damage to four restrooms and ten offices. Three people working on upper floors in the building were not injured, and the perpetrators were never found. Repairs were contracted at $57,769.
