= First National Bank Building (Portland, Oregon) =

Historic building in Portland, Oregon, U.S.

- First National Bank
- U.S. National Register of Historic Places
- Portland Historic Landmark
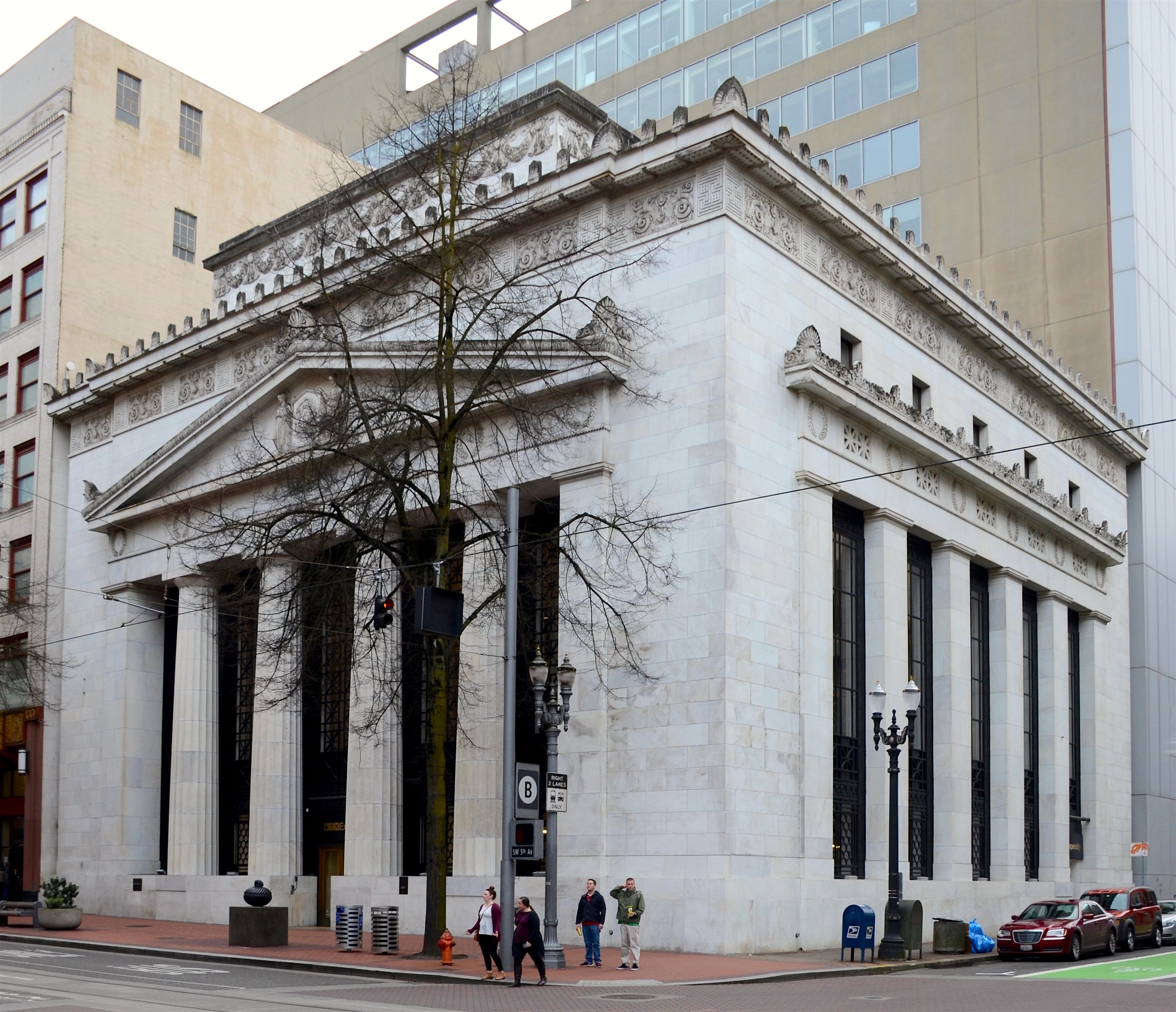
- The building's exterior in 2018

- Location within Portland, Oregon Location within Oregon Location within the United States
- Location: 401 SW 5th Avenue; Portland, Oregon
- Coordinates: 45°31′14″N 122°40′37″W
- Area: 0.3 acres (0.12 ha)
- Built: 1916
- Architect: Coolidge & Shattuck
- Architectural style: Neoclassical / Greek Revival
- NRHP reference No.: 74001707
- Added to NRHP: October 15, 1974

The First National Bank Building is a building located in downtown Portland, Oregon, listed on the National Register of Historic Places.

Located at 401–409 SW 5th Avenue, designed by Coolidge and Shattuck of Boston, resembling some of the Lincoln Memorial classicism, it was built in 1916 when the bank outgrew its earlier quarters and when it was subsequently under the ownership of H.W. Corbett’s grandsons. The building was dubbed the "marble temple". The bank's design bred confidence and was a symbol of security.

The building currently serves as the world headquarters for Expensify.

== Usage ==
Located at S.W. Fifth and Stark, the three-story building was the headquarters of the First National Bank (FNB) in Portland starting in 1916, and continued to be a portion of the headquarters complex until 1972. The bank's main offices later moved into new buildings constructed directly adjacent—first in 1923, in a new four-story marble building at Sixth and Stark (initially occupied by the affiliated Security Savings & Trust Company, but owned by FNB), and later in 1957–59, with a much larger expansion, into a building now known as 400 SW Sixth Avenue, which replaced buildings at Sixth and Washington and in 1960 also replaced the First National Bank's 1923 building.

The original building of 1916 continued to form part of the two-building headquarters complex until 1972, when First National moved its headquarters to the new 40-story tower adjacent to the administration services building next to City Hall. First National then sold its two buildings along Stark Street, with the 1916 landmark being sold to the Oregon Pioneer Savings & Loan Association. The building was saved from destruction and given an historical landmark designation by the city. It became Oregon Pioneer's new headquarters.

== See also ==
- National Register of Historic Places listings in Southwest Portland, Oregon
- Yule marble
