= Sarah Douglass =

Sarah Douglass may refer to:

- Sarah Mapps Douglass (1806–1882), American educator, abolitionist, writer, and public lecturer
- Sarah Hallam Douglass (died 1773), English-born American stage actress and theatre director

== See also ==
- Sara Douglass (1957–2011), Australian writer
- Sarah Douglas (disambiguation)
