= United States Post Office (Scappoose, Oregon) =

- United States Post Office (Scappoose)
- U.S. National Register of Historic Places
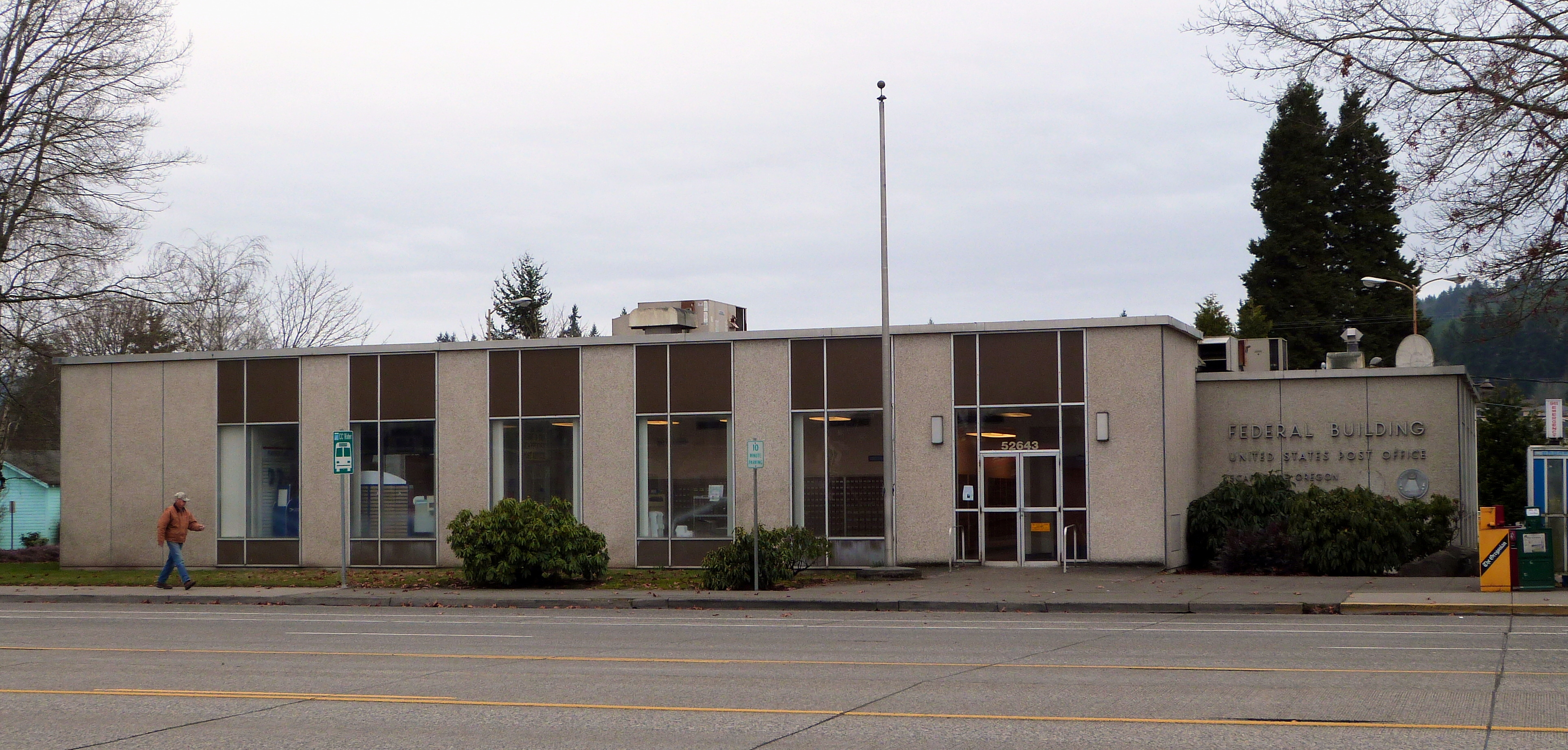
- The Scappoose Post Office in 2014

- Location within Oregon Location within the United States
- Location: 52643 Columbia River Highway; Scappoose, Oregon
- Coordinates: 45°45′34″N 122°52′43″W
- Area: 39,517 square feet (3,671.2 m^{2})
- Built: 1966
- Architect: Stanton, Boles, Maguire & Church
- Architectural style: Modern
- MPS: U.S. Post Office Department Facilities in Oregon 1940-1971 MPS
- NRHP reference No.: 100000618
- Added to NRHP: January 31, 2017

The United States Post Office building in Scappoose, Oregon, is the current post office serving the local community (as of 2016) and a recognized historic structure. Built in 1966, it is an essentially intact example of the "Thousand Series" facilities (Note: Sources also refer to these facilities as the "Thousands Series".) built under the direction of the Post Office Department in the late 1950s and the 1960s. These buildings, mostly of a modest, Modern style, represent one component of an evolutionary period in post office design between the PWA-led monumental buildings of the Great Depression and the 1971 reorganization of postal services. This period was marked by rapid growth, technological change, and decreased Congressional support for funding new construction.

The building was entered on the National Register of Historic Places in 2017.

== See also ==
- National Register of Historic Places listings in Columbia County, Oregon
