= Luther Cressman =

American archaeologist

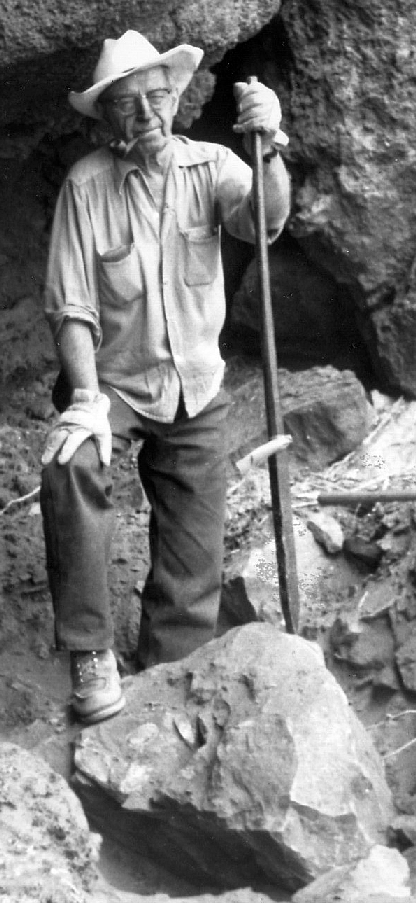
- Cressman at Fort Rock Cave, Oregon, 1966
- Born: Luther Sheeleigh Cressman; October 24, 1897; Pottstown, Pennsylvania, US
- Died: April 4, 1994 (aged 96); Eugene, Oregon, US
- Education: Pennsylvania State University (B.A.); Columbia University (M.A., Ph.D.)
- Occupations: Field archaeologist, professor, sociologist
- Spouses: Margaret Mead (m. 1923; div. 1927) Dorothy Cecelia Loch (m. 1928; died 1977)
- Children: 1 daughter
- Awards: Guggenheim Fellowship; Oregon Book Award (1989); John Alsop King Fellowship; Charles E. Johnson Memorial Award
Luther Cressman
- Priest
- Church: Episcopal
- Term ended: 1928
Orders
- Ordination: 1923

Luther Sheeleigh Cressman (October 24, 1897 – April 4, 1994) was an American field archaeologist, most widely known for his discoveries at Paleo-Indian sites such as Fort Rock Cave and Paisley Caves, sites related to the early settlement of the Americas.

== Early years ==
Cressman was born outside of Pottstown, Pennsylvania, the son of a physician. He was ordained an Episcopal priest in 1923. Majoring in Classics, he graduated with a B.A. degree from Pennsylvania State University in 1918. Feeling doubts about his vocation, he began studying sociology and anthropology at Columbia University in New York. He received his Ph.D. from Columbia in 1928, and that same year, he left the priesthood.

== Career ==
In 1929, he took a position as Professor of Sociology at the University of Oregon. The Department of Anthropology was founded by him six years later. His first hire for the department was Homer Barnett. Cressman was the chair of the department from 1935 until his retirement in 1963.

He was the first professional archaeologist to excavate the Paisley Caves in 1938 and this research became his most significant discovery, when at the same year he discovered a pair of perfectly preserved shredded sagebrush bark sandals at Fort Rock in Oregon that were radiocarbon dated from 10,500 to 9,300 years old, making them the oldest footwear ever discovered.

As late as 1962 he taught an Introduction to Anthropology course with another professor. At the first lecture the younger professor said he struggled with how to address Dr. Cressman. They were peers by PhDs so it would have been all right to use his first name but since Cressman was greatly senior he said it didn't seem right to call him Lou, and left it there. Dr. Cressman pointed out he didn't tell us what he called him. Dr. Cressman said, "He calls me, 'Doc'."

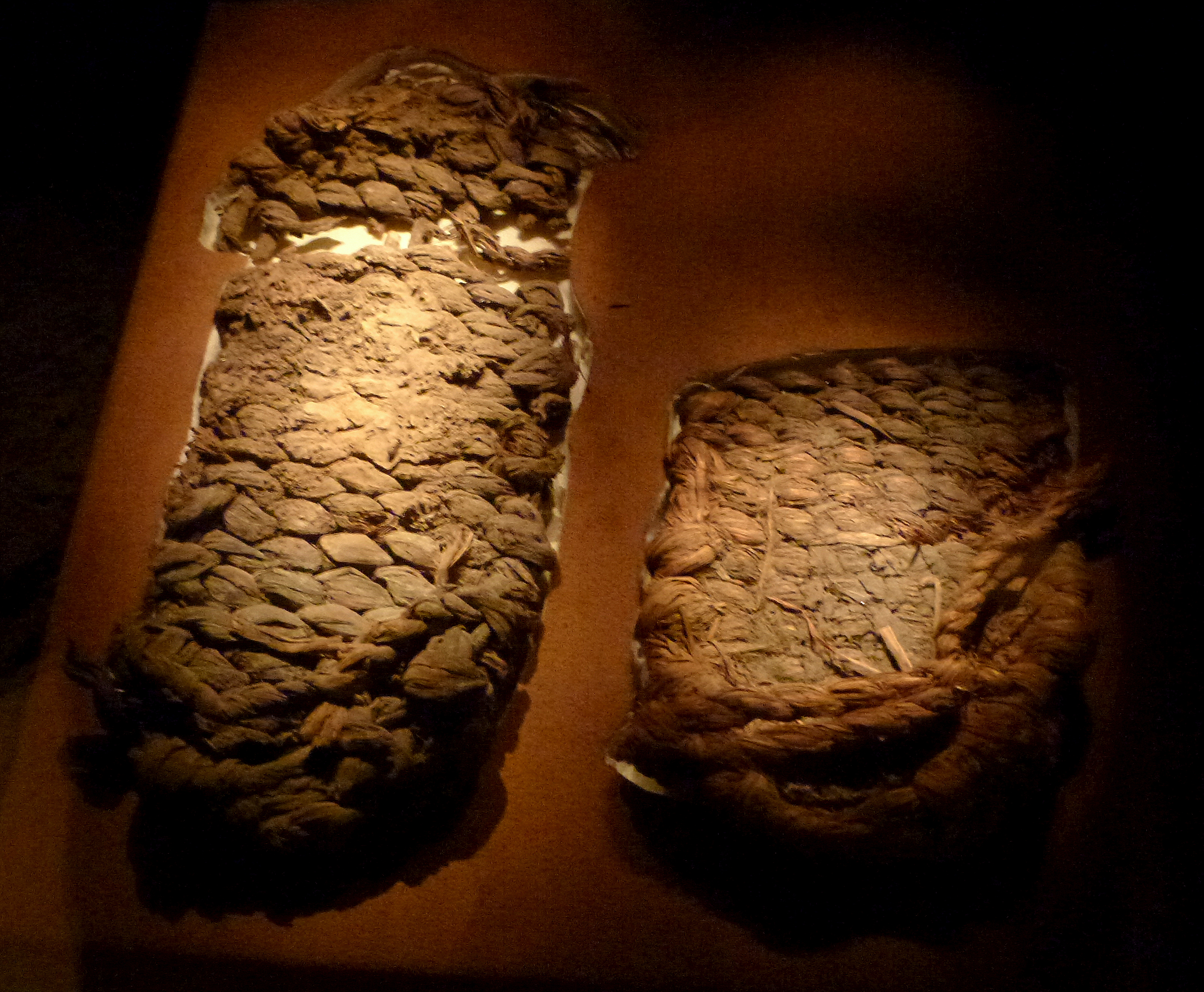
The Fort Rock Sandals, which Cressman discovered in 1938

His autobiography A Golden Journey: Memoirs of an Archaeologist was awarded the 1989 Oregon Book Award for literary nonfiction.

== Personal life ==
Cressman married anthropologist Margaret Mead in 1923; the couple divorced in 1927. He married Dorothy Cecelia Loch in 1928. They had one daughter and were married for 49 years, until her death in 1977.

Cressman died on April 4, 1994, in Eugene, Oregon. A memorial service was held at Gerlinger Hall on the UO campus on April 21 of that year.

== Selected publications ==
- Klamath Prehistory (1956, OCLC 1574790)
- The Sandal and the Cave (1962; 1981 reprint, ISBN 0870710788)
- Prehistory of the Far West: Homes of Vanished Peoples (1977, ISBN 0874801133)
- A Golden Journey: Memoirs of an Archaeologist (1988, ISBN 0874802938)

== Awards ==
- Guggenheim Fellowship
- John Alsop King Fellowship
- Charles E. Johnson Memorial Award
