= Calumet Photographic =

Germany-based photography speciality store

- Type: Private
- Industry: Photographic products and services
- Founded: 1939
- Founder: Kenneth Becker
- Fate: US operation purchased by C&A Marketing in bankruptcy auction. EU operation still active.
- Headquarters: Bahrenfelder Straße 260; 22765 Hamburg, Germany
- Number of locations: 18
- Area served: UK, Germany, Netherlands, Belgium
- Key people: Christof Bergmann, Managing Director
- Products: Cameras, video, film, accessories.
- Number of employees: 200
- Website: www.wexphotovideo.com

Calumet Photographic, Inc., often shortened to Calumet Photo and formerly known as Calumet Manufacturing Company, is a photographic retail and photofinishing specialty store, originally headquartered in Chicago, Illinois. In 2012, the company owned and operated a chain of 32 locations worldwide. The company had 15 locations in the United States, 8 in the United Kingdom, 6 in Germany, 2 in the Netherlands and 1 in Belgium, with 200 employees and an annual revenue of $10 million.

On March 12, 2014, Calumet Photographic filed Chapter 7 bankruptcy. C&A Marketing, the New Jersey–based owners of a number of retail photo brands including Ritz Camera, Wolf Camera, Inkley's, Camera World, and RitzPix, purchased the US-based assets on May 1, 2014 for $4 million.

On May 7, 2014, the company announced that it would reopen its Oak Brook, Illinois, retail store location, and did so on May 11; it served as the anchor for the brand. The final three stores closed in January 2016.

== History ==
In 1939, Kenneth Becker founded the sporting goods store Calumet Manufacturing Company that sold an occasional camera in Chicago. After several years of manufacturing darkroom equipment, in 1955 the company bought the rights to Kodak's Master View 4x5 camera, enabling Kodak to leave the view camera business. In the 1960s, the company innovated the Caltar large format lens line, the C-2 roll film holder and the nitrogen burst film and print processors.

In 1980, the company transitioned from being a large format proprietary product vendor to being a full-line photographic product supplier. In 1983, the company left the view camera manufacturing business and outsourced production to the Netherlands. In 1989, Calumet made a notable improvement on Polaroid instant film technology. In 1992, the company leased 85,000 square feet (7,900 m^{2}) of office space in Bensenville, Illinois, and relocated its corporate headquarters.

In the 1990s, Calumet was acquired by Wolsely plc, a UK FTSE100 company primarily involved in the Plumbing and Construction industry who already had acquired the main United Kingdom professional photo retail chain KJP, who already had branches throughout the UK and also in Germany and the Netherlands. Wolsely sold the company in the early 2000s and the European operation was then rebranded as Calumet. By early 2009, the company had 20 locations in Europe. In 2007, the retail location in Bensenville was moved next to the Oakbrook Center shopping mall in Oak Brook, Illinois. In February 2012, the company acquired the three remaining Washington, DC, area Penn Camera locations after a United States bankruptcy court ruling following Penn Camera's elimination of 5 of its 8 locations. In October 2012, the company opened three new locations in Maryland, Florida and Illinois following the bankruptcy and liquidation of Ritz Camera. As of 2012, the company's headquarters were located on West Bliss Street in Chicago.

Calumet stores hosted free classes, seminars and demonstrations in dedicated spaces.

On March 13, 2014, the following was posted on the company's Facebook page: "After 75 years of business it is with a heavy heart that we announce our immediate closing in the United States (our European stores will continue). It has been a joy to share our passion for photography with you all of these years. We'll miss each other and we'll miss all of our customers. Thank you for everything." At the same time their website and Twitter account also went offline. Shortly after, the same message was posted on the locked doors of the closed stores. According to Crain's Chicago Business, the company filed for Chapter 7 Bankruptcy after a lender opted not to continue its financing.

In April 2014, some of the principals bid on the inventory, store leases and other assets. On May 2, C&A Marketing acquired most of the assets and announced plans to reopen both calumetphoto.com and the equipment rental business. Less than one week later, the C&A announced that it would reopen the Oak Brook, Illinois, location on May 11.

In January 2016 C&A Marketing closed all remaining Calumet locations in the United States.

== European operations ==
The 2014 bankruptcy of the U.S. branch had no direct impact on Calumet Photographic's operations in the UK and mainland Europe, where all stores continue trading as normal.

Following the growth of the camera rental market, Calumet Photographic UK launched a dedicated rental website to feature rental equipment and allow customers to reserve equipment. In 2014, the UK brand won a Gold Retailer award for customer service from Amateur Photographer and What Digital Camera. In March 2015, the Calumet Student Photographer Of The Year award program was launched in partnership with photographic brands including Canon Inc and Manfrotto.

On June 7, 2016, mid-market investment firm Aurelius announced that it had acquired Calumet International Ltd., a holding company comprising both the Calumet Photographic brand and professional lighting producer Bowens Lighting. Calumet Photographic's physical presence, in July 2016, comprised nine branches in the UK, six in Germany, two in the Netherlands and one in Belgium.

On March 3, 2017, Aurelius announced it had acquired competing UK company Wex Photographic, and the two companies would be merged. In September 2017 they announced the two businesses would be rebranded in the UK as Wex Photo Video and a new London store opened, the largest in the UK. As of 2023, Wex Photo Video operate 14 stores across major cities in the UK, together with a mail order and equipment rental operation.
