= William Beaty Boyd =

American academic (1923–2020)

President of the University of Oregon
- In office 1975–1980
- Preceded by: Robert D. Clark
- Succeeded by: Paul Olum

President of Central Michigan University
- In office 1968–1975
- Preceded by: Judson Foust
- Succeeded by: Harold Abel

Personal details
- Born: February 3, 1923 Mount Pleasant, South Carolina
- Died: December 16, 2020 (aged 97) Racine, Wisconsin
- Education: Presbyterian College; Emory University; University of Pennsylvania

William Beaty Boyd (February 2, 1923 – December 16, 2020) was an American academic administrator and professor. Boyd was an alumnus of Presbyterian College (BA 1946), Emory University (MA 1947), and the University of Pennsylvania (Ph.D. 1954). He was a professor of history at Michigan State University and Alma College. He was also Vice Chancellor of Student Affairs at the University of California, Berkeley.

Boyd served as president of Central Michigan University from 1968 to 1975 and the University of Oregon from 1975 to 1980. In the fall of 1977, National Lampoon's Animal House was filmed on the Oregon campus and in greater Eugene. Notably, when he had been the Vice Chancellor at Berkeley, he had been approached with the offer have The Graduate filmed on Berkeley campus, but when he consulted with other senior administrative colleagues, they advised him to turn it down due to the lack of artistic merit, leading to the film being shot at USC instead. After the movie became a hit, Boyd was determined not to make the same mistake twice. He agreed to allow Animal House to be filmed on the campus, and even his own office to be used, on the condition that the school's name was not to be mentioned in the film.

Boyd led the Johnson Foundation, located at Wingspread near Racine, Wisconsin, from 1980 to 1988. He died at his home in Racine, Wisconsin at the age of 97 on December 16, 2020.
