= Ernest Haycox Estate =

Historic building in Portland, Oregon, U.S.

- U.S. National Register of Historic Places
- Portland Historic Landmark
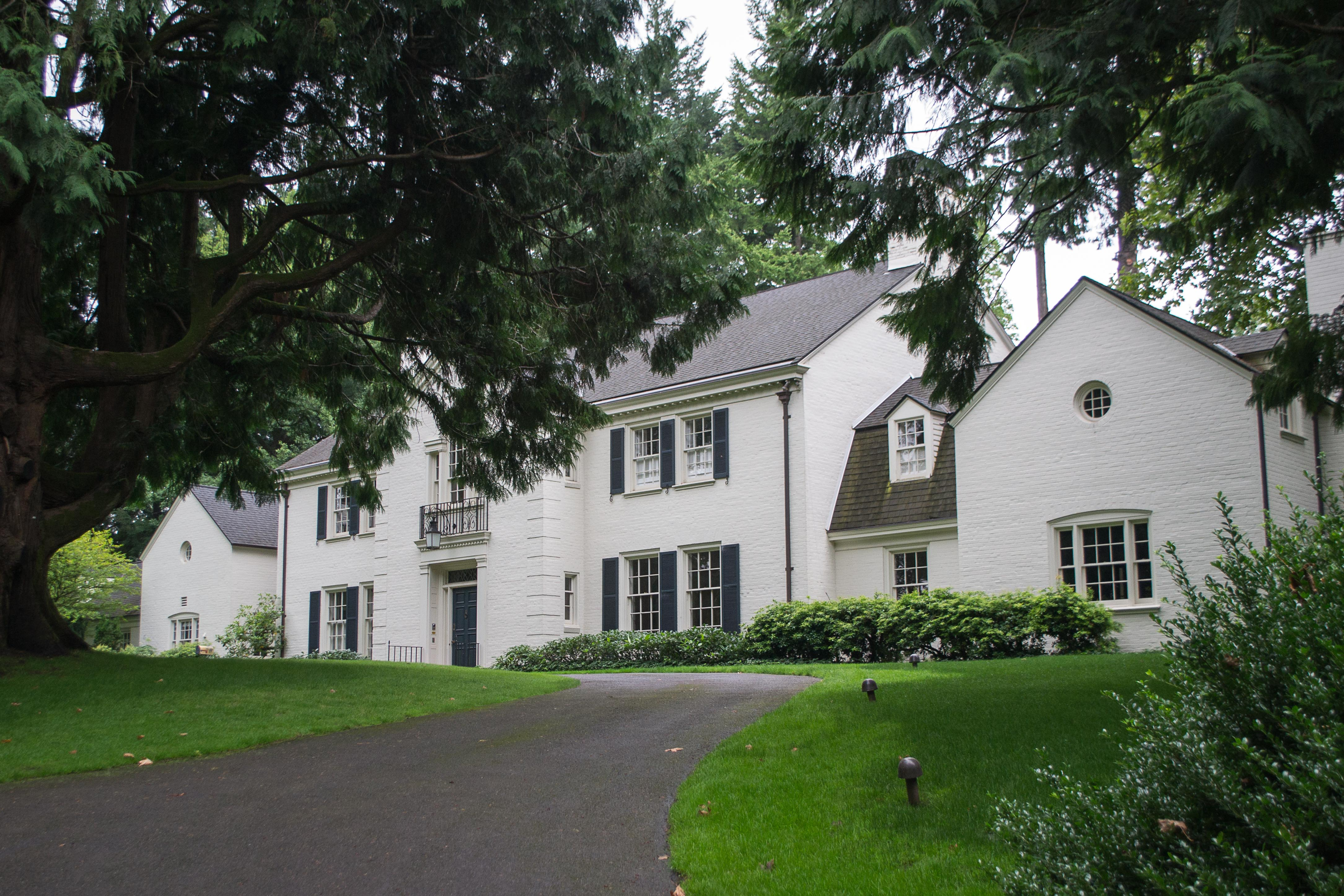
- The Haycox Estate house in 2013.

- Location within Portland, Oregon
- Location: 4700 SW Humphrey Boulevard; Portland, Oregon
- Coordinates: 45°30′17″N 122°43′30″W
- Area: 6 acres (2.4 ha)
- Built: 1940
- Architect: Glenn Stanton
- Architectural style: Colonial Revival, Georgian Revival
- NRHP reference No.: 93001565
- Added to NRHP: January 28, 1994

The Ernest Haycox Estate, located in southwest Portland, Oregon, is listed on the National Register of Historic Places. The Georgian-Colonial Revival Style house was designed by Glenn Stanton for author Ernest Haycox and completed in 1940.

== See also ==
- National Register of Historic Places listings in Southwest Portland, Oregon
