= Ritz Camera & Image =

American photographic retail and photofinishing specialty store

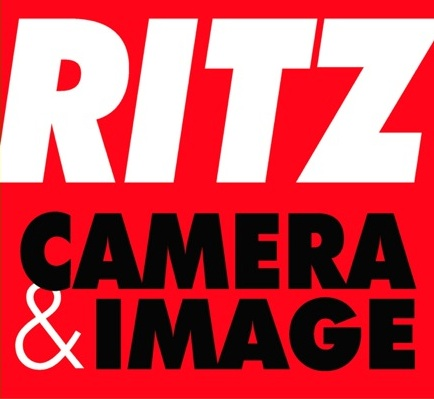
- Type: Subsidiary of C&A Marketing
- Industry: Photographic products and services
- Founded: 1918
- Defunct: 2012
- Fate: Chapter 11 bankruptcy
- Headquarters: 2 Bergen Turnpike; Ridgefield Park, NJ 07660; United States
- Key people: Harry Klein (President); Chaim Pikarski (Vice President)
- Website: www.ritzcamera.com

Ritz Camera & Image (formerly Ritz Camera Centers) is a photographic retail and photofinishing specialty store, headquartered in Edison, New Jersey. The company owns and used to operate a chain throughout the United States under the names Wolf Camera, Inkley’s and Ritz Camera. In 2012, Ritz Camera was acquired by C&A Marketing.

== History ==
The family-owned company (Ritz Camera Centers, Inc., predecessor in interest to Ritz Camera & Image, LLC) was founded as a portrait studio in 1918 by Benjamin A. Ritz, in the Ritz Hotel in Atlantic City, New Jersey. In the early 20th century, it became a tradition to have special events like weddings, graduations, or confirmations captured with a B. A. Ritz portrait. In 1936, Benjamin and his brother Edward opened the first Ritz film-processing lab in Washington, D.C. Ritz Camera was headed by Edward's son, David Ritz.

== Services ==
Ritz Camera was the first chain photofinishers to offer 4×6 prints from 35mm film, as well as free bordered prints, as standard. Ritz Camera is also the first national chain to offer 4.5×6, commonly known as 6D, prints. Unlike the traditional 4×6 prints used for film, Ritz's 6D prints reflect the different aspect ratio of 4:3 digital images. Ritz stores stocked 6D sized frames and albums.

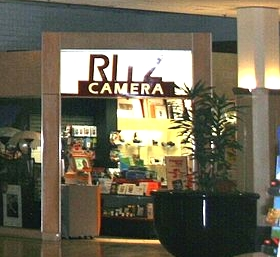
A Ritz Camera store inside a Carlsbad, California shopping mall in 2009

In July 2003, Ritz Camera introduced Ritzpix.com, which also offers customers online ordering and in-store pickup within an hour. Ritzpix.com is currently powered by Lucidiom. In 2010, customers had an option on ritzpix.com to have an online order delivered next day to their home at no extra charge.

In May 2006, Ritz Camera announced a partnership with YesVideo to start offering same day DVD Transfers in all stores nationwide. These stores can transfer VHS, SVHS, MiniDv, Digital 8, and digital media to DVDs in about the time any particular tape takes to play.

From 2007 to early 2008, Ritz began installing Oki and Xerox equipment in their locations to enable the production of hard-back photo books, photo calendars, and custom greeting cards by customers via in-store kiosks or through RitzPix.com for in-store pick up. Ritz and Motophoto are the only two national retailers to offer these services in a one-hour lab.

Beginning in 2008, Ritz began installing lamination/mounting machines in many of their stores to offer foamcore mounting and laminating up to 24×36 inch prints in store.

In February 2010, Ritz started offering Metallic Printing up to 30×40 size on Kodak Professional Endura Metallic Paper and Deep Matte Prints on Fujifilm Paper.

In May 2010, Ritz Camera started the Ritzpix Network, which for up to $20/month in imaging products, customers could get up to $100 off any qualifying camera. After multiple requests from customers, Ritz Camera & Image created the Ritz & Wolf Photo Patrol. Photo Patrol consist of Private Tutoring, four free Photography Classes with camera purchase, and 2-hour seminar classes.

== Ritz Camera & Image acquired Kits Camera Inc. ==
In 1997, Ritz Camera & Image (then Ritz Camera Centers Inc.) entered into negotiations with the head officials at Kits Camera Inc., another specialty photography retail business. Kits Camera Inc. was a Seattle-based retail business founded by Firoz Lalji (also known as Feroz "Phil" Lalji) in 1975 with over 140 stores at the time of acquisition. The company was seen as a competitor to Ritz Camera & Image at the time.

During the same year, Ritz Camera & Image acquired Kits Camera Inc. Following the acquisition, the total number of stores under Ritz Cameria & Image increased to 810 across 47 states.

== Ritz Interactive ==
In 1999, David Ritz and others founded Ritz Interactive, Inc., an Irvine, California–based e-commerce company formed to bring the retail store brands to the internet. Despite the fact that the two companies share warehouse space and some personnel, Ritz Interactive and Ritz Camera Centers are officially separate companies.

In 2002, Ritz Interactive acquired the Internet division of Cameraworld.com, a Portland, Oregon–based company. (Cameraworld.com's store and catalog business were acquired by Ritz Camera, rather than Ritz Interactive.)

In 2003, Amazon.com formed a sales alliance with Ritz Interactive, Inc., in a deal to broaden the online retail giant's selection of camera products and accessories.

According to the Wall Street Journal, Ritz Interactive Inc., which operates the websites for such retailers as Ritz Camera and Boaters World, filed for Chapter 11 bankruptcy protection on August 19, 2011. The Irvine, Calif., company reported assets of about $809,000 and debts of $7.2 million in its bankruptcy petition, filed Friday with the U.S. Bankruptcy Court in Santa Ana, Calif. Court papers show Ritz Interactive’s executive committee of its board of directors deemed the Chapter 11 filing “in the best interests” of the company, its creditors and stakeholders. Court papers show that David Ritz holds an 18.55% stake in the company. Among Ritz Interactive’s debts are a $3.55 million secured claim held by Ritz Camera. Ritz Interactive’s top unsecured trade creditors include American Express, owed about $434,000; Federal Express, owed nearly $104,000; and Google, owed more than $45,000. In May 2012, Ritz Interactive was acquired by Ritz Camera & Image.

== Bankruptcies ==
=== 2009 bankruptcy and purchase by RCI ===
On February 22, 2009, Ritz Camera Centers, Inc. filed for Chapter 11 bankruptcy protection. Chief Restructuring Officer Marc Weinsweig cited the 2008 ongoing recession caused Ritz's 2008 holiday sales to be "materially lower" than a year earlier. Boater's World also suffered heavy losses in 2008 as gas prices soared. On April 2, 2009, it announced the closure of more than 300 stores nationwide and the liquidation of its Boaters World subsidiary in an attempt to reorganize and emerge from bankruptcy.

On July 21, 2009, Reuters reported that a group called "RCI" had agreed to purchase the firm's remaining 375 stores for $33.1 million; the group included David Ritz. The group said it would attempt to keep all 375 stores open. The purchase agreement required approval of the bankruptcy court which was scheduled to hear the case on July 23.

In November 2009, the new company, Ritz Camera & Image, LLC (RCI) opened five new stores, with a total open of about 300, with a wider range of products, including televisions, compact laptop computers, and smartphones.

=== 2012 bankruptcy and liquidation ===
On June 22, 2012, Ritz Camera & Image filed for Chapter 11 bankruptcy protection again and closed 128 of its stores. On September 6, 2012, liquidation specialists Gordon Brothers Retail Partners LLC and Hilco Merchant Resources LLC won an auction for Ritz Camera's assets and began the process of closing most of the 137 stores that remained. New Jersey–based camera distributors C&A Marketing have acquired the online RitzPix business and will operate a few of the retail locations across the country.

On September 10, 2012, it was announced that all Ritz, Wolf and other associated subsidiaries would close by the end of October, while a few would reopen under C&A Marketing alongside Ritzpix and RitzCamera.com on November 1, 2012, and other stores were sold individually or in small groups to other retailers, including three locations to Calumet Photographic.

== See also ==
- Digital camera
- Film camera
- Photography
