= Jim Isch =

- Education: Kansas State University; Boston University

Jim Isch was the chief operating officer of NCAA. He was appointed to the role on August 13, 2010, having served as the interim executive director of the National Collegiate Athletic Association following the death of Myles Brand on September 16, 2009.

“In the coming months I intend to move that agenda,” Isch, who was the NCAA senior vice president for administration and chief financial officer, said. “To put that in simple terms, it will continue to focus on academic reform, fiscal responsibility, continued integration of athletics and academics and a continued emphasis on student-athlete well-being,” according to the NCAA.

Isch was vice chancellor for finance and administration at the University of Arkansas, Fayetteville from 1994 to 1998 prior to joining the NCAA. He was also the vice president for administration at Montana State University – Bozeman from 1986 to 1994. Additionally, he served at Kansas State University, where he was assistant vice president for facilities planning and budget (1985–1986), budget director (1982–1985) and assistant budget officer/accounting instructor (1977–1982).

An Army veteran, Isch earned his undergraduate degree and a doctor of philosophy degree from Kansas State and his master's from Boston University.
