= Myles Brand =

American academic administrator (1942-2009)

- Brand in 2009

4th President of the National Collegiate Athletic Association
- In office January 1, 2003 – September 16, 2009
- Preceded by: Cedric Dempsey
- Succeeded by: Jim Isch (Interim); Mark Emmert

16th President of Indiana University
- In office July 1, 1994 – December 31, 2002
- Preceded by: Thomas Ehrlich
- Succeeded by: Adam Herbert

14th President of University of Oregon
- In office July 1, 1989 – June 30, 1994
- Preceded by: Paul Olum
- Succeeded by: David B. Frohnmayer

Personal details
- Born: Myles Neal Brand; May 17, 1942 Brooklyn, New York City, U.S.
- Died: September 16, 2009 (aged 67) Indianapolis, Indiana, U.S.
- Education: RPI (B.S.); University of Rochester (Ph.D)
- Profession: Academic administrator

Academic background
- Thesis: Some systematic and extra-systematic considerations concerning the description of human actions (1967)
- Doctoral advisor: Richard Clyde Taylor

Academic work
- Discipline: Philosophy
- Institutions: University of Pittsburgh; University of Illinois at Chicago; University of Arizona; Ohio State University; University of Oregon; Indiana University

Myles Neal Brand (May 17, 1942 – September 16, 2009) was a philosopher and university administrator who served as the 14th president of the University of Oregon, the 16th president of Indiana University, and the fourth president of the National Collegiate Athletic Association (NCAA) of the United States.

== Philosophical work ==
Brand mainly focused on a metaphysical area known as philosophy of action. Seminal works include The Nature of Human Action (1970) and a book called Intending and Acting: Toward a Naturalized Action Theory (1984).

In one of his major papers, Intentional Actions and Plans (1986), Brand defended the notion of intentional action as "action performed in following a plan", approximating an initial formal definition for the concept as follows:

(D1) S As intentionally during t iff

(i) S’s Aing during t is an action and

(ii) during t, S follows a plan that includes his Aing

(where S ranges over subjects, A over action types, and t over temporal durations)

However, Brand is dissatisfied as he believes the definition "serves to delineate the reach of intentional action, but not its extent". In other words, the definition falls into the 'causal deviance problem' where one's action may not follow a plan, yet it may be intentional; so he alternatively proposes:

(D2) S As intentionally during t iff

(i) S’s Aing during t is an action and

(ii) during t, S follows a plan that has subroutines $R_1,...,R_n (n\geq1)$ and his Aing is contained in at least one of $R_1,...,R_n$

== Personal life ==
Brand was born in Brooklyn, New York. His family moved to Jericho, New York (on Long Island) but he was bused to Carle Place High School as Jericho did not have a high school of its own. He graduated in 1960. He played lacrosse and basketball as a college freshman. Brand earned his Bachelor of Science degree in philosophy from Rensselaer Polytechnic Institute in 1964, and his Ph.D. in philosophy from the University of Rochester in 1967.

Prior to serving at Indiana University, Brand was president at the University of Oregon from 1989 to 1994. Brand's other administrative posts include provost and vice president for academic affairs, Ohio State University, 1986–89; coordinating dean, College of Arts and Sciences, University of Arizona, 1985–86; dean, faculty of social and behavioral sciences, University of Arizona, 1983–86; director, Cognitive Science Program, University of Arizona, 1982–85; head, department of philosophy, University of Arizona, 1981–83; chairman, department of philosophy, University of Illinois at Chicago, 1972–80. He began his career in the department of philosophy, University of Pittsburgh, 1967–72. In 2003, he received an honorary degree in Doctor of Humane Letters from Oglethorpe University.

On January 17, 2009, it was announced that he had been diagnosed with pancreatic cancer and that his long-term prognosis was not good. He died eight months later, at age 67, on September 16, 2009.

== Tenure at Indiana University ==
Brand was president of Indiana University from 1994 through 2002; the school is a nine-campus institution of higher education with nearly 100,000 students, 17,000 employees and a budget of $3.4 billion. Brand oversaw the consolidation of the IU Medical Center Hospitals and Methodist Hospital to form Clarian Health Partners in 1997. Also, under his leadership, the university's endowment quadrupled and it became a leader annually in terms of overall private-sector support.

Brand may be best known for terminating men's head basketball coach Bob Knight in 2000. Reactions to the firing were varied, with public opinion split with strong feelings one way or the other, common across the state. The night of the firing, a crowd estimated at 2,000, consisting mostly of students, vandalized the Showalter Fountain, the university football field and marched on the president's on-campus home, the Bryan House. During this unrest, Brand was hanged in effigy but fundraising with alumni and donors reached record highs. Knight was replaced by IU's first hire of an African American coach, Coach Mike Davis, who led the team to the Final Four in 2002.

One of his most notable and nationally acclaimed speeches was to the National Press Club in 2001, entitled, 'Academics First: Reforming Intercollegiate Athletics'. He underscored the need for the academic community to acknowledge and address the disparities that exist between intercollegiate athletics and the true mission of higher education.

On September 24, 2019, it was announced that the Informatics building on the IU-Bloomington campus would be re-named "Myles Brand Hall" in recognition of the "pathbreaking contributions that President Brand made to the academic core of this university".

== NCAA leadership ==
In 2003, roughly two years after he fired Bob Knight, Brand left Indiana University to become president of the National Collegiate Athletic Association, located in Indianapolis. Brand was the first college president to head the NCAA.

Brand established a system for tracking each team's graduation rates, and brought attention to the fact that men's basketball teams had lower-than-average graduation rates.

Following Brand's death, Senior Vice-President Jim Isch was named interim president on September 22, 2009.

== Legacy ==
In 2019, Indiana University renamed the Informatics buildings at the corner of 10th Street and Woodlawn Avenue on its Bloomington campus Myles Brand Hall in honor of its 16th president.

A website of his Collected Works includes over 300 speeches, op eds, podcasts, and videos. A Special Issue of The Journal of Intercollegiate Sport co-edited by Peg Brand Weiser and R. Scott Kretchmar entitled, "The Myles Brand Era at the NCAA: A Tribute and Scholarly Review" offers recollections and analysis by various peers and scholars of his goal to integrate athletics into academics, his pursuit of gender equity, racial parity, and other issues of social justice, and an understanding of his legacy of leadership style.

Academic offices
Preceded by Paul Olum	President of the University of Oregon; 1989–1994	Succeeded by Dave Frohnmayer
Preceded by Thomas Ehrlich	President of Indiana University; 1994–2002	Succeeded by Adam Herbert
