= Paul Olum =

American mathematician (1918–2001)

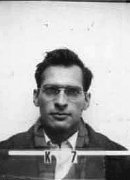
- Paul Olum, date unknown
- Born: August 16, 1918; Binghamton, New York, United States
- Died: January 19, 2001 (aged 82); Sharon, Massachusetts, U.S.
- Citizenship: American
- Education: Harvard University; Princeton University
- Scientific career
- Fields: Mathematics
- Workplaces: Cornell University; University of Texas; University of Oregon
- Doctoral advisor: Hassler Whitney

Paul Olum (August 16, 1918 – January 19, 2001) was an American mathematician (algebraic topology), professor of mathematics, and university administrator.

== Early years ==
Born in Binghamton, New York to a father who was a Russian Jew who immigrated at age of nine to escape persecution, Olum took an interest in mathematics at an early age. He graduated summa cum laude from Harvard University in 1940. In 1942 he married Vivian Goldstein, completed an MA in physics at Princeton University, and joined the scientific staff of the Manhattan Project. During his time at Los Alamos, Olum was among the Los Alamos scientists who questioned the implications of the atomic bomb, and after its use against Japan, he became a lifelong advocate for world peace and for nuclear arms control.

Reportedly, one reason he switched from physics to mathematics as his field was that compared to his office mate, future Nobel laureate Richard Feynman, Olum did not think he was good at physics. He returned to Harvard after the war to complete his Ph.D. in mathematics in 1947 under Hassler Whitney as his thesis advisor. Among his close friends was Feynman, who wrote in his autobiography of Paul's intelligence. In one anecdote, Feynman told of an experience at Los Alamos when he had claimed to be able to take any problem that could be stated in ten seconds and find an answer to within ten percent in no more than sixty seconds. When Feynman made this challenge to Olum, he quickly responded, “Find the tangent of 10 to the 100th.”

== Cornell ==
Following a postdoctoral year at the Institute for Advanced Study, Olum joined the Cornell University faculty in 1949. Over the next 25 years at Cornell, Olum rose to the rank of professor, served in various administrative roles, and spent time as a visiting faculty member at the University of Paris, Hebrew University, Stanford University, and the University of Washington, and also returned as a member of the Institute for Advanced Study.

As a mathematician, Olum was widely respected for his research in algebraic topology. He made significant contributions in the area of obstruction theory. His Ph.D. students include Martin Arkowitz, Robert Lewis, Jean-Pierre Meyer, and Norman Stein.

In 1962, Olum initiated the Cornell Topology Festival, an annual regional mathematics conference. From 1963 to 1966, Olum served as Mathematics Department chair, and recruited a number of talented faculty.

Olum advocated the abolition of the House Committee on Unamerican Activities, was an early critic of the Vietnam War, and sought to remove the Reserve Officer Training Corps from the Cornell campus. Olum assisted in the establishment of Cornell's Women's Studies Program in 1972. Following the Willard Straight Hall Takeover in 1969, Olum chaired a committee to propose a major overhaul of Cornell's governance, including its Board of Trustees. Olum's relationship with his fellow Los Alamos physicist Dale Corson, who had just become Cornell's President, assisted in this difficult task. Olum led the group which convinced the Trustees to adopt the plan, included a student-faculty-employee University Senate and the addition of Trustees elected by students and by that Senate. In 1972, Olum was the first Faculty Trustee elected by Cornell students — the only such position in the nation at that time.

== University of Texas ==
Olum served as Dean of the University of Texas at Austin College of Natural Sciences from 1974 through 1976. Those were turbulent years, as President Stephen Spurr, who had hired Olum, was removed by the Board of Regents in fall 1974, and replaced by Lorene Rogers. All administrators were placed in a difficult role while students protested Rogers' appointment and the faculty conducted a boycott of any faculty meetings chaired by Rogers.

== University of Oregon ==
In 1976, Olum was named provost at the University of Oregon. Despite an economic recession and budget cuts, Olum worked to improve Oregon's academic standing, serving as President from 1980 to 1989. While Olum was President, Oregon started 20 new research institutes and academic programs, built a new $34.6 million science complex—“the most significant construction program in the university’s history”—and helped develop the University's Riverfront Research Park. He also oversaw construction of a $27 million remodeling of Oregon's library. While President, Olum also supported the fight against apartheid in South Africa and advocated nuclear disarmament.

In 1987, the Executive Committee of State Board of Education required Olum to retire by June 30, 1989. Despite extensive faculty and student protest, this decision stood, and Olum left office with Oregon a much stronger institution. The University named the Paul Olum Atrium and a mathematics research professorship in his honor. The University's child development center is named in honor of his wife, Vivian.

In 1990, following his retirement from the University of Oregon, Olum moved to Athens, Greece, and lived with Margarita Papandreou. In 1996, he lived in Sharon, Massachusetts with his son, Ken Olum.

Academic offices
Preceded by William Beaty Boyd	President of the University of Oregon; 1980 - 1989	Succeeded by Myles Brand
