= Camera World =

Photography retailer and service provider in Portland, Oregon

- Type: Private company (1977–2002); Brand (2002–2016)
- Industry: Retail
- Founded: 1977
- Founder: Jack Shin
- Fate: Acquired by Ritz Camera, becoming a brand of Ritz
- Headquarters: Portland, Oregon, U.S. (1977–2000); Beaverton, Oregon (2000–2002)
- Area served: North America

Camera World was a retailer of photographic equipment and photofinishing services based in Portland, Oregon, United States, and founded in 1977. It was an independent company until 2002, and then from 2002 to 2016 it was a brand of Ritz Camera & Image or C&A Marketing. In the mid-1990s, it was one of the largest mail-order retailers of photographic and audio equipment in the nation. The company's revenues totalled $80 million in 1998, of which $16 million were from online sales. Revenues grew to $115.7 million in 1999 (equivalent to $223.6 million in 2025), and the company relocated its administrative offices and inventory to a new facility in Beaverton, Oregon, the following year. The company's only brick-and-mortar store, in downtown Portland, as well as its Internet business were sold in 2002 to Ritz Camera, which continued to operate them under the Camera World name. Ritz, in turn, was acquired by C&A Marketing in 2012, but retained the Camera World name as a Ritz brand, for both the store and the Internet business, until closure of the store. The store closed on January 21, 2016.

== History ==
Camera World was founded in Portland in 1977 by Chung Doo "Jack" Shin (often identified as J. D. Shin), a Korean-American who had emigrated to the U.S. from South Korea in 1973 and moved from New York to Portland in 1976. The business was originally a single store, located in the ground floor of the Swetland Building, at SW 5th and Washington in downtown Portland. It never opened any additional stores, but expanded into mail-order sales and, later, Internet sales. The mail-order business was launched in 1982. The company had 45 employees in 1990. Sales reached $53 million in 1993.

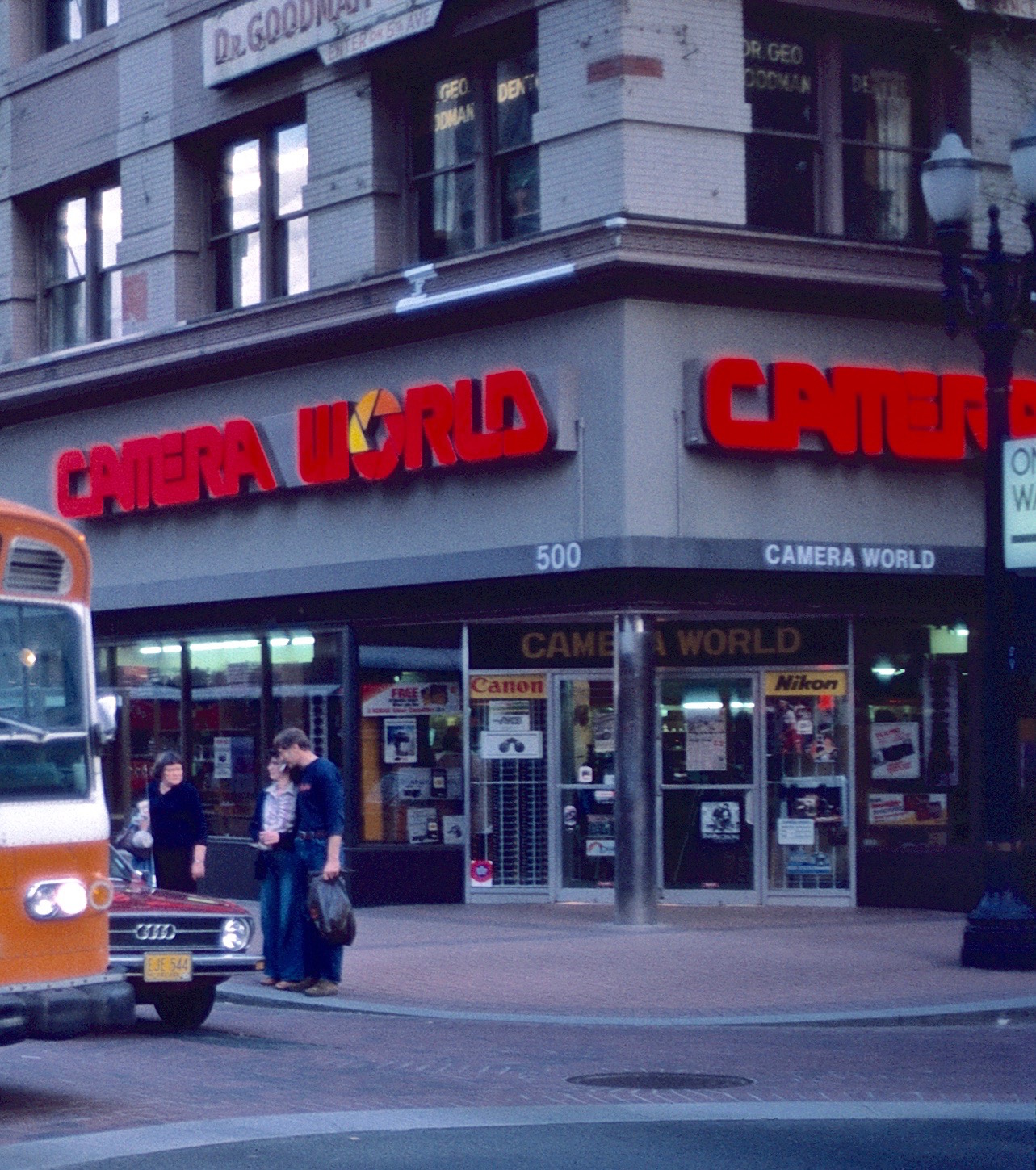
Camera World's original store, in the Swetland Building, in 1985. The company's large mail-order operations were in the same building.

By the mid-1990s, Camera World had become one of the nation's largest mail-order retailers of photographic and audio equipment. In 1995, around 75 percent of Camera World's business was in mail-order sales, and the company employed 65 people. The company's headquarters and mail-order operations were located in the same building as the store, the Swetland Building, at 5th and Washington. The entire seven-story building was owned by Shin, who had acquired it in the late 1970s.

In November 1995, Camera World's sole store was relocated to a much larger space in the 400 SW Sixth Avenue building, at that building's 6th & Washington corner, only one block away from the old location. The old store had occupied about 5,000 square feet (460 m^{2}) of retail space, while the new store had 9,700 square feet (900 m^{2}). The Swetland Building continued to house the company's mail-order operations and inventory, as well as administrative offices.

The company launched its website, Cameraworld.com, in 1996. Founder J. D. Shin sold the business in 1997 to Sverica International, an investment group based in San Francisco. Internet sales grew from only $1 million in 1997 to more than $15 million in 1998. Total revenues were about $80 million in 1998, of which 20 percent was from online sales, and grew to $115.7 million in 1999, of which 52 percent was from online sales. The company changed its name to Cameraworld.com in March 1999.

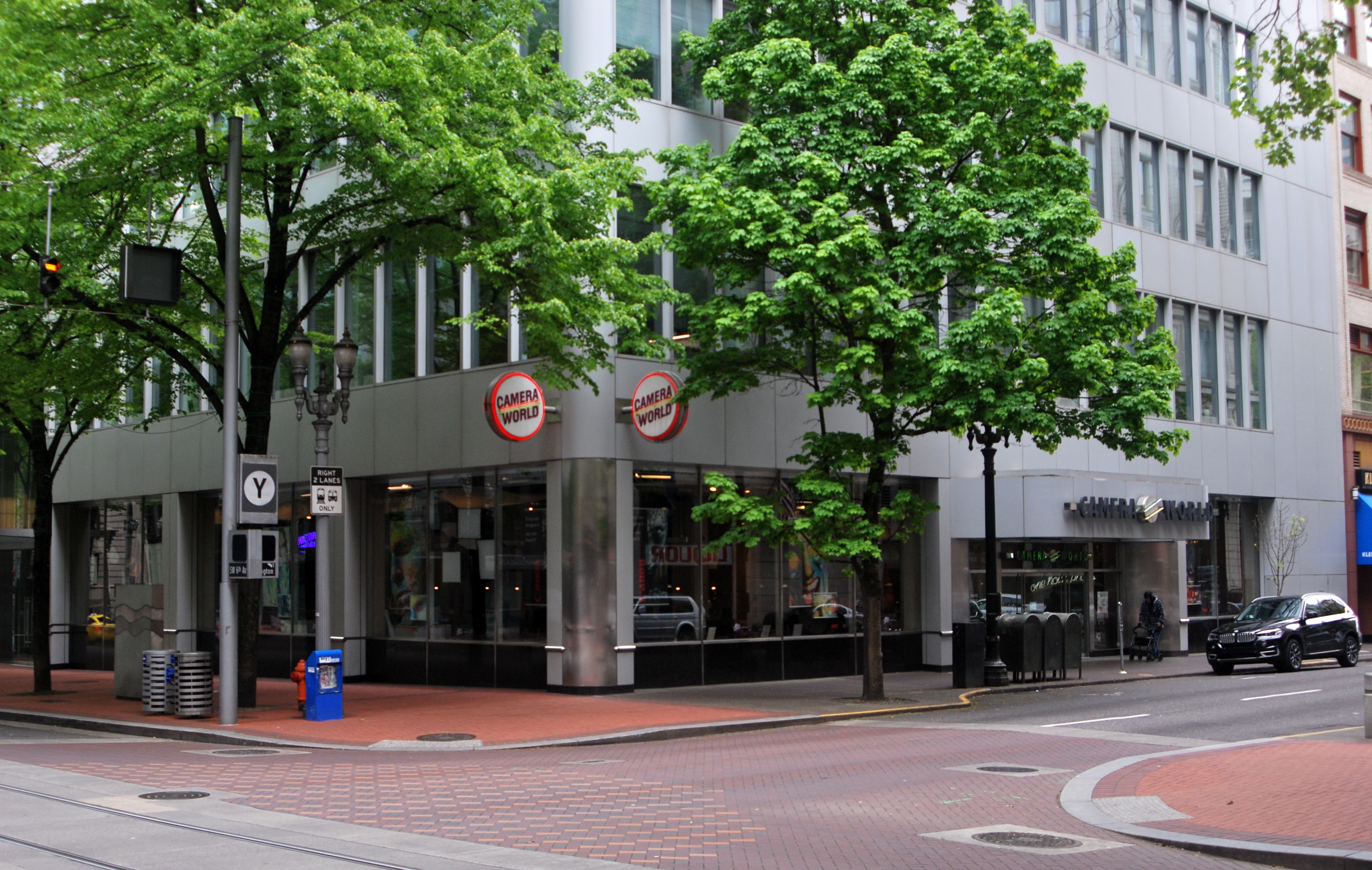
From 1995 to 2016, the Camera World store was located in the 400 SW Sixth Avenue building.

In the late 1990s, Camera World's corporate offices and distribution center were located in Northeast Portland. In 2000, the company built a new warehouse in the Portland suburb of Beaverton and moved its offices and most other operations to that location. The size of the company's workforce peaked in 2000 at about 175 employees.

In 2002, Camera World's online business was sold to Ritz Interactive, Inc., and its store and catalog business was sold to Ritz Camera Centers. The Camera World name was retained by both Ritz companies.

In 2012, the Camera World brand was among several Ritz brands acquired by C&A Marketing, which also chose to continue using it, but ceased using it shortly after the closure, in late January 2016, of the only brick-and-mortar store.
