= Homer Barnett =

American anthropologist (1906–1985)

Homer Garner Barnett (1906 in Bisbee, Arizona – May 9, 1985) was an American anthropologist and teacher.

== Education ==
He began his studies at Stanford in civil engineering but soon quit to rethink his major. When he returned to Stanford it was as a liberal arts major with an emphasis on philosophy. He graduated in 1927. He later attended the University of California, Berkeley for his Ph.D., granted in 1938. His specialization was culture change and applied anthropology.

As a student, Barnett did field work among the American Indians of Oregon, Washington, and northwestern California, particularly the Yurok, Hupa, Yakama, and several small groups of the Oregon coast. Some research concerned diverse ethnological matters but focused primarily on the Indian Shaker religion and the potlatch. The latter was the subject of his doctoral dissertation.

== Teaching ==
In 1939 after receiving his Ph.D. he began working at the University of New Mexico as the field director of the Jemez Archeological Field School. Soon after this position ended he moved on to the University of Oregon. Here he became the second member of the Anthropology department, along with Luther Cressman. After serving for a few years during World War II, Barnett returned to the University of Oregon and continued to study Pacific cultures.

From 1947 to 1948, Barnett conducted field research on the indigenous people of Palau.

Barnett continued to study American Indians in California and the Pacific Northwest and displaced communities in the Pacific. He served as a visiting lecturer for the American Anthropological Association from 1960 until 1961. He spoke at college campuses that did not have anthropology departments, trying to spread his knowledge of anthropology. Barnett became an emeritus professor at the University of Oregon in 1971 and officially retired in 1974. After his retirement Barnett worked on writings and publications up until the time of his death May 9, 1985.

== World War II ==
During World War II he stopped teaching to participate in the Far Eastern Language and Area Training Program of the University of California at Berkeley. Here he trained volunteer service men to effectively gain information from native informants to help the war effort. In 1944 he began working with the Ethnogeographic Board to provide scientific information about human and natural resources of world areas. He later began working with the War Document Survey in the Pacific to give advice about documents that the U.S. government was acquiring from other governments during the war.

== Select bibliography ==
- Culture element distributions. VII: Oregon coast, 1937
- Gulf of Georgia Salish, 1939
- Innovation: the basis of cultural change, 1953
- The Coast Salish of British Columbia, 1955
- Anthropology in administration, 1956
- Indian Shakers; a messianic cult of the Pacific Northwest, 1957
- Peace and progress in New Guinea, 1959
- Being a Palauan, 1959
- Palauan society, a study of contemporary native life in the Palau Islands, 1959
- Application to the National Science Foundation for research funds in support of a project entitled a comparative study of cultural change and stability in displaced communities, 1962
- The nature and function of the potlatch, 1968
- The Yakima Indians in 1942, 1969
- Qualitative science, 1983 (ISBN 0533053730)
- Culture processes, 1992
