= Robert D. Clark =

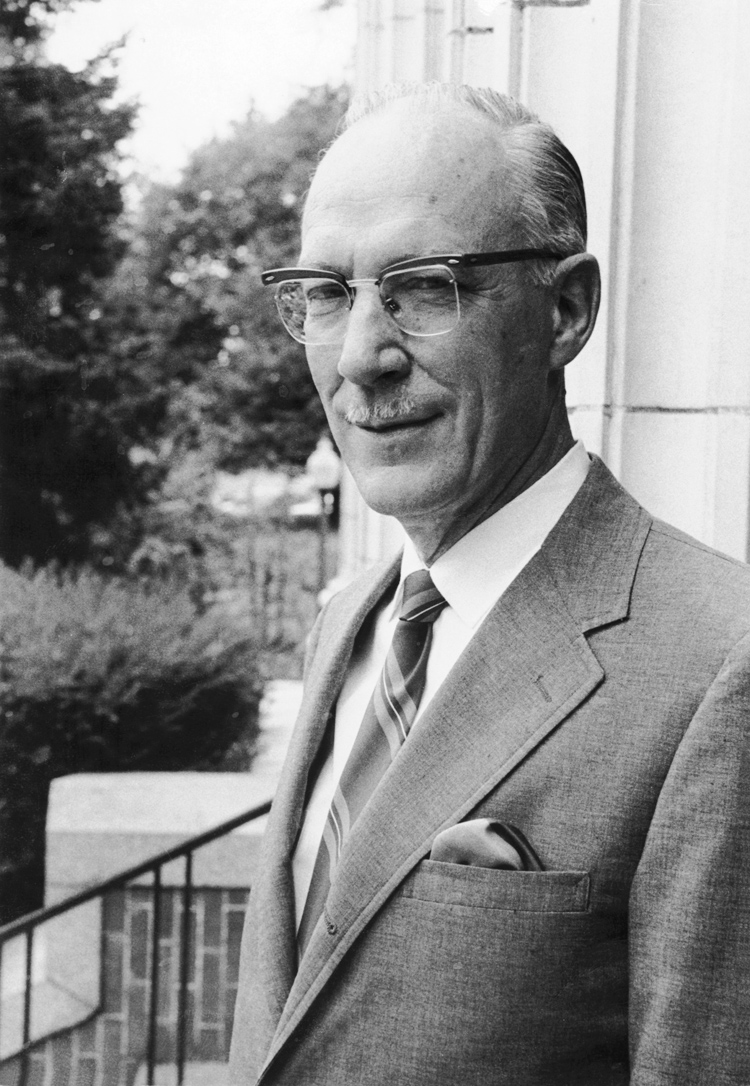

11th President of the University of Oregon
- In office 1969–1974
- Preceded by: Arthur S. Flemming
- Succeeded by: William Beaty Boyd

18th President of San José State University
- In office 1964–1969
- Preceded by: John T. Wahlquist
- Succeeded by: Hobert W. Burns

Personal details
- Born: Robert Donald Clark; March 10, 1910 Frontier County, Nebraska, U.S.
- Died: June 28, 2005 (aged 95) Eugene, Oregon, U.S.
- Education: Point Loma Nazarene University (BA); University of Southern California (MA, PhD)

Robert Donald Clark (March 10, 1910 – June 28, 2005) was an American educator and university administrator.

== Early life ==
Robert Donald Clark was born in Frontier County, Nebraska, on March 10, 1910. The family moved frequently.

== Education ==
Clark graduated from high school in Colorado, then received a B.A. in English (with a minor in History) from Pasadena College (now known as Point Loma Nazarene University) in 1931 and a M.A. in speech from the University of Southern California in 1935. While at USC Clark also taught freshman composition at various colleges. Clark received his Ph.D. in 1946, also from USC with a dissertation titled "The Platform and Pulpit Career and Rhetorical Theory of Bishop Matthew Simpson."

== University of Oregon ==
While teaching composition classes at the University of Oregon, Clark was appointed to Assistant Dean of the College of Liberal Arts (CLA) in 1947, which he held until being chosen as Dean of CLA in 1955. He was president of the University of Oregon from 1969 to 1975. The Robert D. Clark Honors College on campus is named after him.

Clark was president during many war protests on the campus, including when students burned down the ROTC building, and when the National Guard marched onto campus and launched tear gas at protesting crowds. Throughout this period, Clark was known for defending the rights of students to protest and speak out against the war. Following the Kent State Shootings, protests on campus died down significantly.

== San Jose State College ==
From 1964 until 1969, Clark served as president of San Jose State College, where he was known for his support of the civil rights struggles of African-American athletes, including Olympians John Carlos and Tommie Smith. He was the first president screened and nominated by a representative faculty group. "Clark envisioned his task as one of continuously improving the quality of the institution and making it more responsive to the intellectual needs and aspirations of the student body" (Gilbert and Burdick, 171). Despite the unrest and violence of the 1960s, Clark contributed much to the curriculum and set an example for mutual cooperation and community relations. Clark established one of the first Ombudsmen at any US College or University in 1968. Clark resigned in 1969 after a strike by faculty members whom Clark previously considered allies.

A five-story library that opened in early 1982 on the San José State University campus was named after former College President Clark. Since 2005, the library has been converted into Robert D. Clark Hall, a classroom building.

== Media ==
Clark was the subject of a short documentary in 2005 titled "Oregon's War at Home and the Man who Brought the Peace." Produced through the Oregon Documentary Project and created by University of Oregon students, it told the story of Clark's time as president of UO, and how he handled students protesting the Vietnam War.

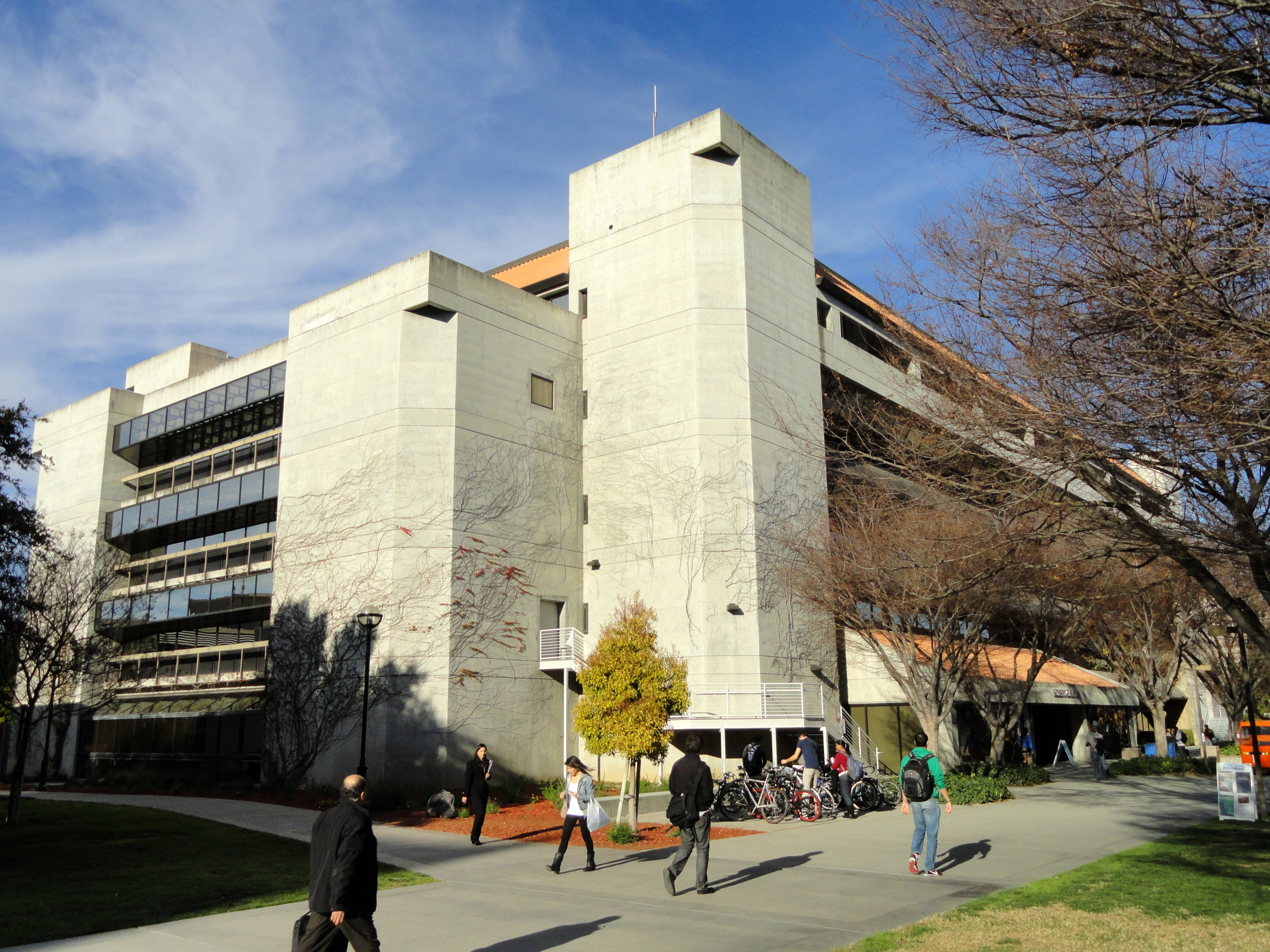
Formerly San José State's library, the Robert D. Clark Hall sits across from the Victory Salute monument

"Oregon's War at Home and the Man who Brought the Peace" won the Student Award at the 2006 Northwest Emmy Awards and aired on Oregon Public Broadcasting.

== Other appointments ==
In 1936 Clark was the editor for the Western States Communication Association.

Clark died June 28, 2005, in Eugene, Oregon.
