= 400 SW Sixth Avenue =

Office building in Portland, Oregon

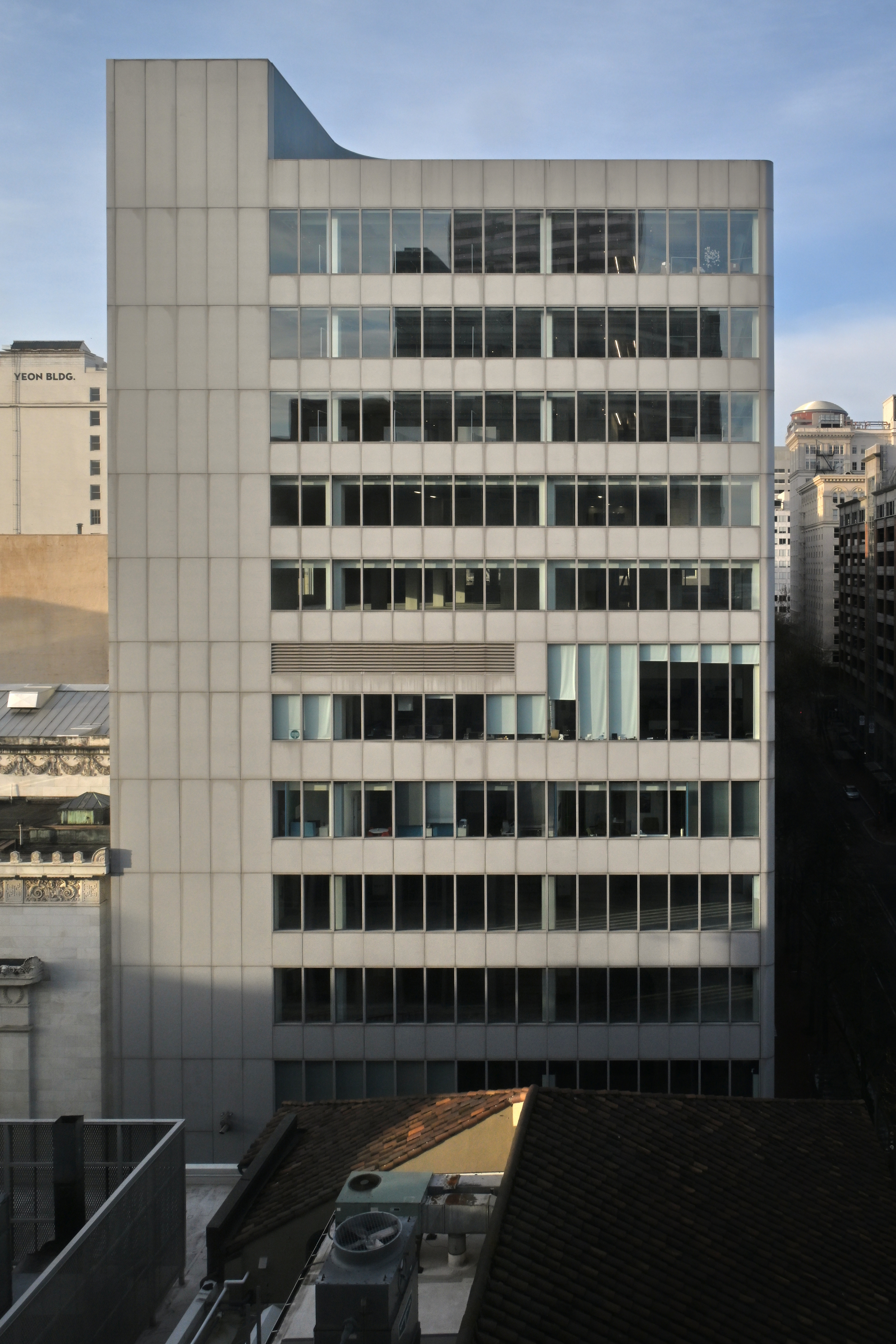

- Location within Portland, Oregon
- Former names: First National Bank Building; First Farwest Life Building

General information
- Type: Commercial offices, retail
- Location: 400 SW 6th Avenue; Portland, Oregon
- Coordinates: 45.52077°N 122.67744°W
- Construction started: 1957
- Completed: 1960
- Cost: $3.5 million

Height
- Roof: 139 ft (42 m)

Technical details
- Floor count: 11; 1 below ground
- Floor area: 216,108 ft^{2} (20,077.1 m^{2})

Design and construction
- Architect: Stanton, Boles, Maguire & Church
- Developer: First National Bank of Oregon
- Main contractor: Hoffman Construction Company

400 SW Sixth Avenue is an eleven-story office building in Downtown Portland in the U.S. state of Oregon. Originally known as the First National Bank Building, it opened in 1960 as a six-story bank building. The 139-foot (42 m) tall mid-rise contains 216,108 square feet (20,077.1 m^{2}) of space, with retail on the ground floor. From 1995 to 2016 the primary retail tenant was Camera World.

== History ==
First National Bank of Oregon announced it would build a new headquarters building in 1957, with the contract to build the structure going to Hoffman Construction Company. The planned $3.5 million, five-story building was designed by Stanton, Boles, Maguire & Church and was to have 100,000 square feet (9,300 m^{2}) of space. The building was to be on the site of the Century Theater and Lafayette Building, and would also require the demolition of part of the bank's existing headquarters.

Construction began in December 1957 on what was to be a two-phase project, in which an initial five-story building would be built to allow the bank to move before its existing 1923 structure was demolished. A second five-story building would then be built in the footprint of the old bank building at SW 6th and Stark. In March 1958, erection of the steel frame began, with plans to have the entire project completed in August 1960. The curtain wall began going up in November 1958, and consisted of glass mosaic squares, becoming the first building in the Northwest to use this new type of panel.

In September 1959, the first of the two buildings opened. The exterior mosaic squares were Italian blue and mounted in wall sections made of aluminum. The interior utilized walnut and light marble trim, and included what was believed to be the largest piece of carpet ever laid in the Pacific Northwest at that time, which was installed by Meier & Frank. Construction then commenced on the second structure, and the combined building opened in September 1960. On the ground floor, the plans called for the new building to be connected to First National's former headquarters building, a three-story structure built in 1916, which continued to house the main public branch, facing SW 5th Avenue. That building still stands and is listed on the National Register of Historic Places as the First National Bank.

In 1972, First National Bank of Oregon moved its headquarters to a new building located elsewhere in downtown, the First National Bank Tower, but retained a bank branch in the old building on 6th Avenue. Over time, First National became First Interstate Bank and then Wells Fargo through a series of mergers and acquisitions. First National sold the old headquarters building in October 1972 for $3.1 million to Schnitzer Investment Company. The building was then sold by Schnitzer in 1976 to First Farwest Life Insurance Company to serve as its headquarters, with the building renamed as the First Farwest Life Building. The building was expanded by 112,000 square feet (10,400 m^{2}) in 1983 with Hoffman Construction again as the contractor.

First Farwest Corp. sold the building, which had served as the insurer's headquarters, to United Trust Fund Inc. in 1987 for $25 million, though Farwest remained a tenant. United Trust then sold the building in August 1988 for $30.5 million to Almaden Plaza Associates, which included the lease with Farwest. In February 1989, Farwest became insolvent and was seized by regulators, including then insurance commissioner Ted Kulongoski, with later liquidation. After the bankruptcy of Farwest, Almaden Plaza Associates could no longer pay the mortgage, and the building was deeded to John Hancock Mutual Life Insurance Company by Almaden in 1990, who then sued United Trust over misrepresentations concerning Farwest.

In 1992, the building was raised to eleven stories, with the exterior changed to aluminum and stainless steel. Camera World opened its flagship store on the ground floor in 1995. The building was purchased by the Louis Dreyfus Property Group (LDPG) in 1999 from John Hancock. LDPG sold the building to Felton Properties and Newmark & Co. Real Estate Inc. in 2004 for $30.25 million. UTi Worldwide Inc. became a major tenant in 2011 with 52,000 square feet (4,800 m^{2}) leased over several floors.

In late 2017 the building was purchased by investors for $68 million.

== Details ==
400 Sixth is of modernist design and stands 139 feet (42 m) tall. The building has both ground floor retail space and office space for a combined 216,108 square feet (20,077.1 m^{2}) of gross leasable space. The eleven-story structure has an exterior clad in aluminum and stainless steel. Inside, there are marble floors, woodwork in the lobbies and the elevators, and more aluminum touches. The building also has underground parking with 70 spaces and 50-person conference room. Harland Financial Solutions and UTi Worldwide Inc. are two of the largest tenants in the building.
