= YWCA of Greater Portland =

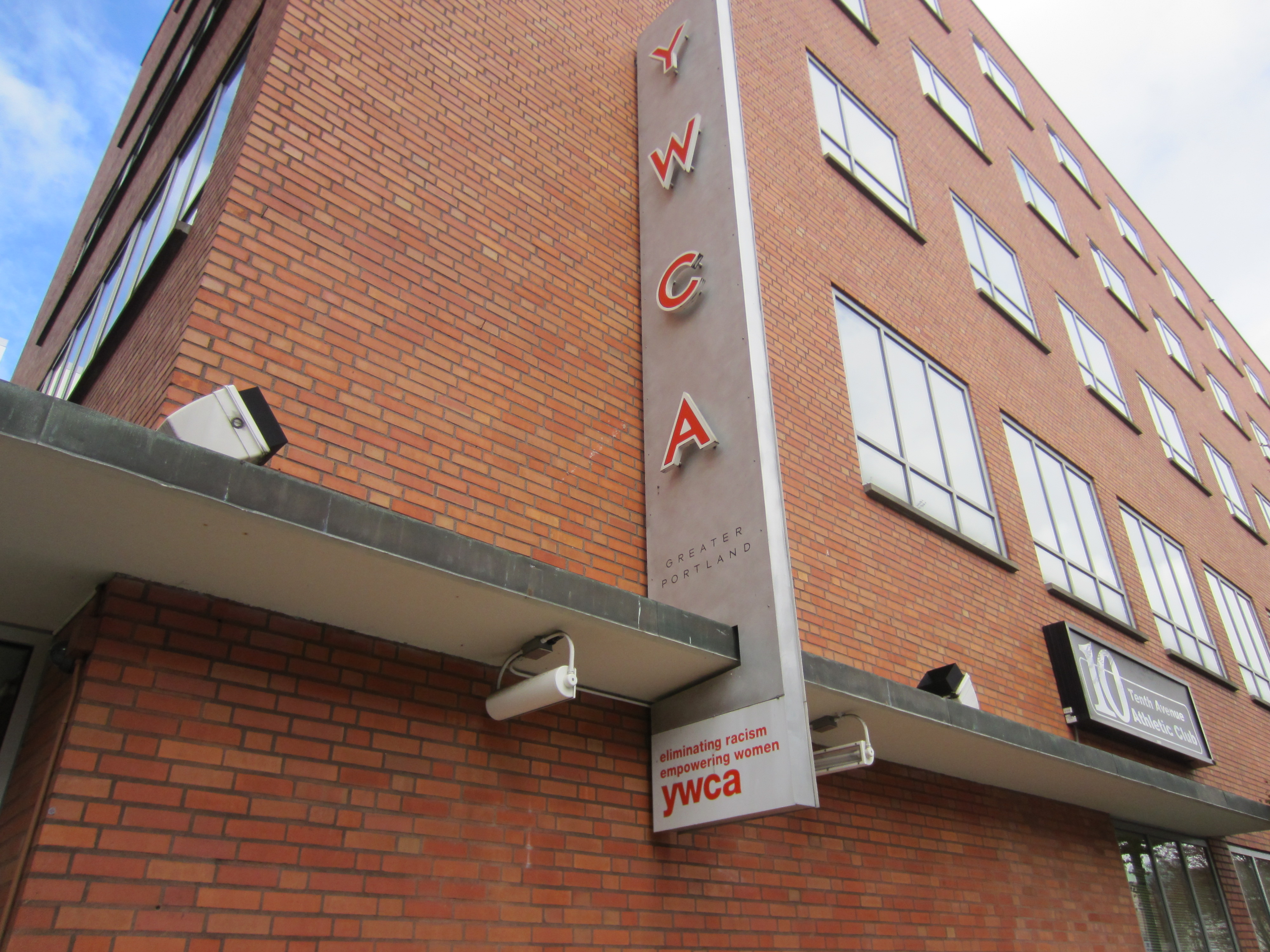
YWCA of Greater Portland

YWCA of Greater Portland is a charitable organization with a mission to eliminate racism, empower women, and promote peace, justice, freedom, and dignity for all. The organization serves Multnomah County in four major areas of programming including youth services, domestic violence services, senior services, and social change.

== History ==
The YWCA of Greater Portland was established in 1901 as part of the larger YWCA USA, Young Women's Christian Association, which was founded in New York City in 1858. The "city association" format of the YWCA was organizing structure of the YWCA was racially segregated at the time. The original Portland board consisted of women from prominent white families, including the Corbetts, Failings, Ladds, and Honeymans. Like other "city associations" of the day, the YWCA sought to reach working women in the downtown area. Along with providing lodging and meals to local women, the Portland YWCA also organized programs to address the needs of women workers more broadly. These initiatives included vocational classes to encourage women to improve their economic independence.

Joint fundraising with the Young Men’s Christian Association of Portland provided funds for the construction of a dedicated building in 1908. In 1918 a group of African-American women sought to extend the YWCA to them. The women's organizing was successful, and in 1921 the Williams Avenue Branch was opened in Northeast Portland.

=== Williams Avenue Branch ===
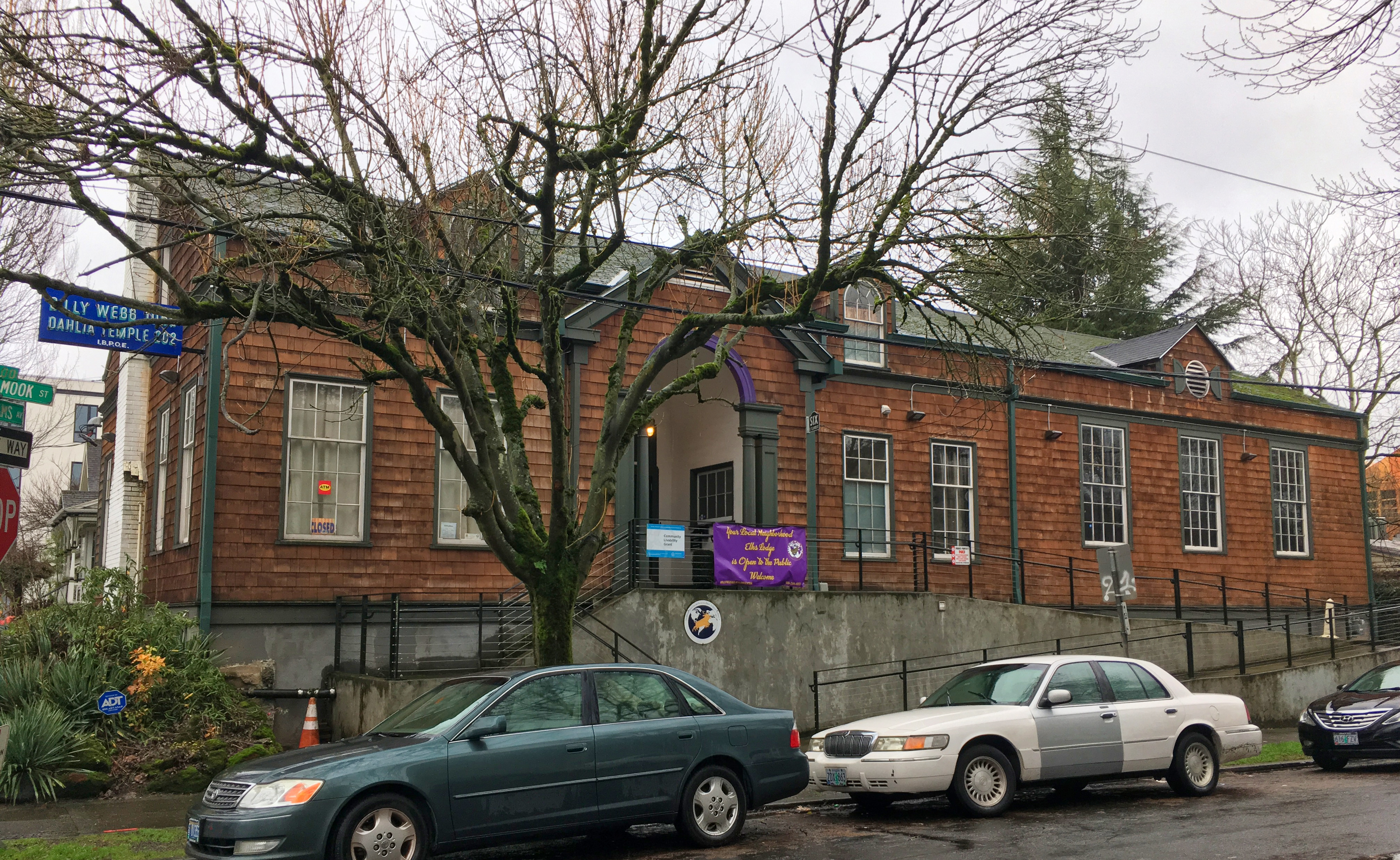
Historic Building, Previously the Williams Avenue Branch of the YWCA

The YWCA's purpose to facilitate fellowship between all females was complicated by the religious requirements for membership in the organization and the barriers between different races caused further issues. This often led to segregated branches in larger cities for African-American women and Asian-American women.

By 1920's, the Portland YWCA had a separate branch for African Americans located on the corner of North Williams and Tillamook Streets. The goal of the branch was to build pride among the women in the surrounding neighborhood. The branch was first established in a portable unit and in 1926 work begun at the site, funded in large part by a $12,000 gift from Mrs. E. S. Collins. The delay was due to conflict in establishing a segregated facility and rumors that the anonymous gift came from the Ku Klux Klan. Further, opposition came to local white Portlanders who did not want black Portlanders to build on the site and worked to prevent the necessary permits.

The building became a hub for community activities. As built, it had a gym with lockers and showers for both boys and girls, an auditorium with a stage, a kitchen, office space, and a lounge. In these spaces, the Williams Branch hosted clubs and classes for school age girls, including sewings, hat making, Bible studies, musical programs, and games. The Branch also hosted events and exhibits featuring black artists and celebrated Negro History Week.

With continued pressure to continue segregating their facilities in the 1940s, the Williams Branch was turned over to the USO to be used by African-American soldiers. The programming for African-American women and girls that had been hosted by the Branch shifted downtown and into the homes of local women. In 1946 the building was returned to the YWCA and reopened as a "Center" with a white woman director.

In 1944, the Portland YWCA restructured and eliminated segregated branches. In 1945 the director of the Portland YWCA was an African American woman, Majorie Jackson, and she noted that, "Because of group and personal insecurity, some of the Caucasian girls refuse to continue in clubs with other racial groups." Jackson made history as first African American to serve as associate executive director of a city YWCA.

The Williams Avenue Branch building was closed in 1959 when it was sold amidst financial difficulties.

== Services ==
The Greater Portland YWCA offers outreach, services, and advocacy related to

- transitional housing
- support groups
- legal advice
- economic justice
- safety planning
- domestic violence
- safety services
- referrals
