= Keith Eggener =

American architectural and art historian

- Born: Portland, Oregon, U.S.
- Education: Portland State University; University of Washington; Stanford University
- Occupations: Architectural and art historian

Keith Eggener is an American architectural and art historian. He is the Marion D. Ross Distinguished Professor of Architectural History in the department of the history of art and architecture at the University of Oregon.

In 2001, Eggener wrote the book Luis Barragán's Gardens of El Pedregal, published by Princeton Architectural Press.
