= Sarah Ann Douglas =

American computer scientist

Sarah A. Douglas
- Born: January 25, 1944 (age 82); Asheville, North Carolina
- Education: A. B., University of California, Berkeley, 1966; Ph.D., Stanford University, 1983
- Known for: Human-Computer Interaction
- Scientific career
- Fields: Computer Science
- Workplaces: University of Oregon
- Doctoral advisor: Thomas P. Moran

Sarah Ann Douglas (born January 25, 1944, in Asheville, North Carolina) is a distinguished computer scientist, known for her work in human-computer interaction (HCI), a field of computer science that she has helped pioneer, and, in particular, pointing devices and haptic interactions, WWW interfaces and bioinformatics, and visualization and visual interfaces. She is a Professor Emerita of Computer and Information Science and a member of the Computational Science Institute at the University of Oregon.

== Early life and education ==
Sarah Douglas was born in Asheville, North Carolina. She lived in Bermuda and the Philippines, as well as in many states in the U.S. Living on these islands, she and her sister were heavily exposed to DDT. During her high school years in Palo Alto, California, she was recruited by the high school district to learn how to program a computer. She began her undergraduate career at Smith College in Northampton, Massachusetts, on a full scholarship, transferred to University of California, Berkeley in her junior year, and graduated from UC Berkeley in 1966 with an A.B. degree in philosophy.

== Career ==
Upon her graduation from college she left the United States and lived in Europe for 18 months, settling in Majorca, Spain for much of that time. Upon returning to the United States, she worked as a professional programmer, systems analyst, Director of Software Development and Director at Computing Systems at Cabrillo College and San Jose State University in California. She returned to graduate school at Stanford University in 1979 and earned a Ph.D. in cognitive ergonomics (computer science, psychology, and engineering) from Stanford in 1983. During her tenure at Stanford, Douglas also served as a research intern at Xerox Palo Alto Research Center (Xerox PARC). Upon her graduation from Stanford, she joined the faculty of the Department of Computer and Information Science Department at the University of Oregon, where she remained until her retirement in 2011. At Oregon, Douglas was a member of the Cognitive and Decision Sciences Institute(Director, 1995–1998) and led the technology team that conceived of and built the Zebrafish Information Network, an international online multimedia database of information for zebrafish researchers. She is the author of over 70 technical papers and a research monograph, The Ergonomics of Pointing Devices; her work has been highly cited.

Douglas served on the editorial board of the journal Interacting with Computers (1996–2005), and as a reviewer for ACM Transactions on Computer-Human Interaction and the ACM Conference on Human Factors in Computing Systems. At the national level she was the Chair of the Human-Computer Interaction Knowledge Focus Group for the IEEE-ACM Computing Curriculum 2001. In 2015, Douglas joined the Breast Cancer Action's Board of Directors, where she advocates for better information and equality concerning breast cancer.

== Honors and awards ==
Douglas was the recipient of grants and awards from the National Science Foundation, National Institutes of Health, Fund for the Improvement of Post- Secondary Education, Computer Research Association, Keck Foundation, US West, Apple Computer, and Intel Corp.

Professor Douglas was elected to the European Academy of Sciences in 2002. She was chair of the Human-Computer Interaction Knowledge Focus Group for the ACM-IEEE Curriculum 2001. She was appointed to Human Sciences Special Editorial Board of the British Computer Society journal Interacting with Computers in 1996. Douglas was chosen for the Charles Johnson Memorial Award for "exceptional service to the university and the community" by the University of Oregon Faculty in June 1995. She received an NSF/CRA Distributed Mentor award (Summer 1994), an EDUCOM 1992 Distinguished Natural Science Curriculum Award and was appointed to Fulbright lectureship in India during 1991–1992.
