= Kyu Ho Youm =

Academic

- Education: Southern Illinois University; Yale Law School; Oxford University
- Employer: University of Oregon School of Journalism and Communication

Korean name
- Hangul: 염규호
- RR: Yeom Gyuho
- MR: Yŏm Kyuho

Kyu Ho Youm is a professor emeritus and the former inaugural holder of Jonathan Marshall First Amendment Chair at the University of Oregon School of Journalism and Communication.

== Personal life ==
In 1982, he earned a Master of Arts degree in journalism from Southern Illinois University, where he went on to pursue his Ph.D. in media law under the supervision of First Amendment scholar Harry Stonecipher; a Master of Studies in Law (M.S.L.) degree from Yale Law School; and a Master in Law degree from Oxford University, where he focused his master's comparative thesis on the First Amendment to the US Constitution vs. the European Convention on Human Rights, Article 10. (Dr. Damian Tambini, currently at the London School of Economics, was his thesis advisor.)

== Works ==
As a journalism and communication law scholar, he has published more than 100 book chapters and research articles in a number of leading journalism and law journals in the United States and abroad since 1985. He is the author and co-author of Press Law in South Korea and Media Law and Ethics and the co-editor of Korean Communication, Media, and Culture: An Annotated Bibliography.

Youm's law review articles have been cited by American and foreign courts, including the House of Lords in Great Britain, the Supreme Court of Canada, the High Court of Australia, the Supreme Court of South Africa, and in congressional testimonies on freedom of expression. In addition, his media law research has been used by American and international lawyers in representing their clients in press freedom litigation. As a member of the Communication Law Writers Group, Youm has been involved in writing Communication and the Law, a widely used media law college textbook in the United States. As an area editor, he has edited nearly 50 articles on communication law and media policy for the 12-volume International Encyclopedia of Communication. He has been named one of seven scholars producing the "most promising" research in journalism and mass communication. Currently, Youm serves on the editorial boards of a dozen major law and communication journals in the United States, England, and Australia, including Journal of Media Law (London), Journal of Broadcasting & Electronic Media, Communication Law & Policy, and Media & Arts Law Review. He has co-guested edited the special issue of Communication Law and Policy on international and comparative law.

Youm has been profiled in American and foreign publications online and off-line. He is active on social media and especially on Twitter about freedom of media and communication in the US and abroad. In September 2011, Forbes.com's columnist Ben Kerschberg noted Youm's tweeting (@MarshallYoum)in "Eight Great Law & Technology Resources." In April 2010, Youm was elected vice president of the Association for Education in Journalism and Mass Communication (AEJMC), the premier academic organization of 3,600-plus JMC educators and practitioners in the U.S. and globally. He served as AEJMC president-elect in 2011 and president in 2012. In August 2020, he received the AEJMC Presidential Award, which he has dedicated to his late wife, Bokim. In 2021, Youm was elected as International Communication Association (ICA) Fellow.

Youm has contributed to American and foreign newspapers and been interviewed by major news media and regional and local news media.
