= List of University of Oregon alumni =

This University of Oregon notable alumni includes graduates and current students of the University of Oregon as well as former students who studied at the university but did not obtain a formal degree.

The university opened in 1876 and the first class contained only five members, graduating in 1878. The university has over 195,000 alumni, 10 of whom are Pulitzer Prize winners, and two of whom are Nobel laureates.

== Academic administration ==
Name	Degree(s)	Year(s)	Notability	Reference
Gene D. Block	M.S. Ph.D.	1972; 1975	Chancellor of UCLA	
Lee Bollinger	B.S.	1954	President of Columbia University; former president of University of Michigan	
Asher Cohen	Ph.D.		President of the Hebrew University of Jerusalem	
Gail Fullerton	Ph.D.	1954	President emeritus of San Jose State University	
Karen L. Gould	Ph.D.	1975	President of Brooklyn College	
Robert Helsley	B.S.	1979	Dean of Sauder School of Business at UBC	
Victor Pierpont Morris	B.A. M.A.	1915; 1920	Dean and interim president, University of Oregon	
Joseph Robertson	M.B.A.	1997	President of Oregon Health Sciences University	
Neil Snider	Ph.D.	1973	President emeritus of Trinity Western University	

== Architecture and design ==
Name	Degree(s)	Year(s)	Notability	Reference
Howard Backen	B.Arch	1962	Founder of BAR Architects and Backen, Gillam & Kroeger	
Brad Cloepfil	B.Arch	1980	Founder of Allied Works Architecture	
Tinker Hatfield	B.Arch	1977	VP, designer and architect for Nike	
Mazharul Islam	B.Arch	1952	Architect credited with bringing modernist architecture to Bangladesh	
Johnpaul Jones	B.Arch	1967	First architect to win the National Humanities Medal	
Rick Mather	B.IArch	1961	RIBA; founder of Rick Mather Architects; trustee of Victoria and Albert Museum	
Mel Streeter	B.Arch	1955	Second African-American to play basketball for the Ducks; founded architecture firm in Seattle	
Sarah Susanka	B.Arch	1978	Architect, author of The Not so Big House	
Eugene Tsui	B.Arch	1981	Controversial architect	
DeNorval Unthank Jr.	B.Arch	1952	Prolific architect in Oregon	
Margo Grant Walsh	B.IArch	1960	Vice chairman emeritus of Gensler	

== Business and finance ==
Name	Degree(s)	Year(s)	Notability	Reference
Kent Alterman	B.F.A	1981	President of Comedy Central	
Robert D. Atkinson	M.A.	1985	President of the Information Technology and Innovation Foundation	
Scott Bedbury	B.S.	1980	Marketing guru	
Darren Berg	attended		Founder of MTR Western and the Meridian Group	
Tim Berry	M.A.	1974	Co-founder of Borland International; founder and president of Palo Alto Software, Inc.	
Bill Bowerman (Note: Bowerman included in both the #Business and finance and #Track sections)	B.S. M.Ed.	1934; 1953	Co-founder of Nike, Inc.	
Tim Boyle	B.S.	1971	CEO of Columbia Sportswear	
Paul Brainerd	B.S.	1970	Founder of Aldus; creator of PageMaker and desktop publishing	
Wallace Campbell	M.A.	1932	Co-founder and president of CARE	
Rudy Chapa	B.A.	1981	Founder and CEO of SPARQ	
Stanley K. Cheng	attended		CEO of Meyer Corporation	
Ed Colligan	B.A.	1983	President and CEO of Palm, Inc.	
Stephen Gillett	B.S.	1998	CEO of Chronicle, an Alphabet company	
Harry Glickman	B.A.	1948	Founder and president emeritus of Portland Trail Blazers	
Jill Hazelbaker	B.S.	2003	Senior vice president of Global Policy and Communications at Uber	
Renée James	B.A. M.B.A.	1986; 1992	Former president of Intel Corporation	
Michael Jones	B.S.	1997	Former CEO of MySpace	
Jack Joyce		1964	Co-founder of Rogue Ales	
Phil Knight	B.B.A	1959	Co-founder, chairman, and former CEO of Nike, Inc.	
Mickey Loomis	B.S.	1979	General manager of the New Orleans Saints	
Monica C. Lozano		1974	CEO of La Opinión and ImpreMedia, LLC	
Miguel McKelvey	B.Arch	1999	Co-founder of WeWork	
Franklin Mieuli	B.A.	1944	Principal owner of Golden State Warriors	
Robert Polet	M.B.A.	1976	Chairman and CEO of Gucci	
James Rippey	B.S.	1953	Co-founder and CEO of Columbia Management, established Oregon's first mutual fund	
Bill Trinen	B.A.	1994	Director of Product Marketing of Nintendo of America	
Lila Bell Wallace	B.A.	1917	Co-founder of Reader's Digest	
Kurt Widmer	B.A.	1978	Co-founder and president of Widmer Brothers Brewing Company	
Dan Wieden	B.S.	1967	Co-founder of advertising agency Wieden+Kennedy	
Larry Williams	B.S.	1964	Stock trader, author of How to Prosper in the Coming Good Years	

== Fine arts and entertainment ==
=== Film, television and performing arts ===
Name	Degree(s)	Year(s)	Notability	Reference
Greg Behrendt	B.A.	1991	Stand-up comedian; former consultant for Sex and the City; author of He's Just Not That Into You and It's Called a Breakup Because it's Broken	
Chris Bliss	attended		Stand-up comedian and juggler	
Edgar Buchanan	attended		Actor (Petticoat Junction)	
Allan Burns		1957	Emmy Award-winning producer (Mary Tyler Moore Show, The Munsters) and screenwriter (The Bullwinkle Show, A Little Romance)	
Ty Burrell	attended		Emmy Award-winning actor (Modern Family)	
Stephen J. Cannell	B.S.	1964	Emmy Award-winning television producer, writer, and novelist (The A-Team, The Greatest American Hero); founder and chairman of Cannell Studios	
Terence Chang		1973	Movie producer (Face/Off, Broken Arrow)	
John Clem Clarke	B.F.A.	1960	Painter and graphic artist based in New York City	
Pam Coats	M.F.A.	1984	Producer (Mulan)	
Sam Elliott	attended	1962-63	Actor (The Big Lebowski, Road House)	
Larry Ferguson	B.S.	1964	Writer, producer, and actor (Beverly Hills Cop II, The Hunt for Red October)	
Mary Finney	attended		Actress (The Children's Hour, Honestly, Celeste!)	
Dennis Gassner	B.S.	1970	Academy Award-winning set designer (Bugsy, Waterworld, The Truman Show, O Brother, Where Art Thou?)	
Howard Hesseman	attended		Actor (WKRP in Cincinnati, About Schmidt)	
Richard R. Hoover	B.F.A	1980	Academy Award Winning visual effects artist (Blade Runner 2049)	
Joe Hutshing	B.A.	1980	Academy Award-winning editor (JFK, Born on the Fourth of July)	
James Ivory	B.F.A.	1951	Academy Award-winning writer (Call Me by Your Name); Director (A Room with a View, Howards End); co-founder of Merchant Ivory Productions	
Christopher Judge	B.F.A.	1985	Actor (Stargate SG-1), graduated from the University as a three-time All-American football player under the name Doug Judge	
Ben Masters	B.S.	1969	Actor, Julian Crane on the NBC soap opera Passions	
Gina Matthews	B.A.	1990	Producer (13 Going on 30, What Women Want, Urban Legend, Isn't It Romantic) and writer (Popular)	
Marissa Neitling	B.S.	2007	Actress (The Last Ship, San Andreas)	
Kaitlin Olson	B.S.	1997	Actress, Sweet Dee on the FX TV show It's Always Sunny in Philadelphia	
James Read	B.S.	1976	Actor, George Hazard on the ABC miniseries North and South, Beaches, Eight Men Out, Charmed, Wildfire	
Heidi Schreck	B.A.	2009	Author and actor, What the Constitution Means to Me	
Don Simpson	B.S.	1967	Producer (Flashdance, Beverly Hills Cop, Top Gun, Days of Thunder, Bad Boys, Crimson Tide, The Rock)	
David Ogden Stiers	attended		Actor (M*A*S*H)	
Eric A. Stillwell	B.S.	1985	Star Trek writer	
Rob Urbinati	Ph.D.	1994	Playwright, stage director	
Jeffrey M. Werner	B.A.	1993	Film editor (The Kids Are All Right, Prom)	
Jeff Whitty	B.A.	1993	2004 Tony Award winner for the musical Avenue Q	
Daniel Wu	B.Arch	1997	Hong Kong movie star (New Police Story, Into the Badlands, Warcraft)	
Bryce Zabel	B.A.	1976	Television producer, director, and writer	

=== Literature ===
Name	Degree(s)	Year(s)	Notability	Reference
Paula Gunn Allen	B.A. M.F.A.	1966; 1968	Native American poet, novelist	
Olga Broumas	M.A.	1973	Poet	
Eugene Gloria	M.F.A.	1992	Poet	
Ernest Haycox	B.A.	1923	Writer of Western fiction; his story "Stage to Lordsburg" was made into the 1939 movie Stagecoach	
George Hitchcock	B.A.	1935	Poet and publisher of the literary journal Kayak	
Ken Kesey	B.S.	1957	Author of One Flew Over the Cuckoo's Nest and Sometimes a Great Notion	
Chang-Rae Lee	M.F.A.	1993	Novelist, Native Speaker; director of Princeton University's Creative Writing program	
Chuck Palahniuk	B.A.	1986	Author of Fight Club, Choke, and Lullaby	
David Reiter	B.A.		Author and poet; 1994 Queensland Premier's Poetry Award; 2012 Western Australian Premier's Award; 2013 Canadian Children's Book Centre Best Book for Teens and Kids	
William L. Sullivan	M.A.	1979	Author of outdoor guide books	
Brian Turner	M.F.A.	1996	Poet	
Lidia Yuknavitch	B.S. Ph.D.	1989; 1998	Novelist and memoirist	

=== Music ===
Name	Degree(s)	Year(s)	Notability	Reference
Jon Appleton	M.A.	1965	Composer, author, and former professor of music at Dartmouth College	
Anthony Brown	B.S.	1975	Jazz musician	
Dave Depper	B.S.	2002	Guitarist and keyboardist for Death Cab for Cutie	
Tom Grant	M.Ed.	1971	Jazz pianist	
Trey Gunn	B.Mus.	1986	Bass player for King Crimson	
Page Hamilton	B.A.	1983	Bandleader, singer, guitarist for Helmet	
Peter Hollens	B.Mus.	2005	Singer and producer	
Bill Homans	B.A.	1987	Blues musician	
Daniel Levitin	M.S. Ph.D.	1993; 1996	Musician; cognitive scientist; sound designer for Chris Isaak and Joe Satriani	
Colin Meloy	attended (Note: Meloy studied for two years of B.A. in English and theatre, then transferred to home-state University of Montana in 1995.)		Author, lead singer of The Decemberists	
Glen Moore	B.S.	1963	Composer; founding member and bassist of Oregon	
Jerold Ottley	D.M.A.	1972	Retired director of the Mormon Tabernacle Choir	
Steve Perry	B.S.	2004	Lead singer of the Cherry Poppin' Daddies	
Dan Siegel	B.S.	1976	Composer, record producer	
Ralph Towner	B.Mus.	1963	Composer; founding member of Oregon	

=== Visual arts ===
Name	Degree(s)	Year(s)	Notability	Reference
James Cuno	M.A.	1978	Art historian and museum director	
Gordon Gilkey	M.F.A.	1936	Art preservationist and promoter, awarded the Meritorious Service Medal	
LaVerne Krause	B.A.	1946	Painter and printmaker	
Suzie Liles	M.F.A.	2006	Master weaver, owner of Eugene Textile Center and Glimakra USA	
Susan Lowdermilk	M.F.A.	1991	Artist and printmaker	
Eric Norstad	M.F.A.	1957	Architect, ceramist, sculptor	
Joe Sacco	B.A.	1981	Comic artist and journalist	
Heidi Schwegler	M.F.A.		Artist	
Charles Stokes	M.F.A.	1968	Painter and sculptor	
Ron Wigginton	M.F.A.	1968	Painter, sculptor and landscape architect	
Russel Wong	B.S.	1984	Photographer	

== Journalism and media ==
Name	Degree(s)	Year(s)	Notability	Reference
Rick Attig	B.S.	1983	Pulitzer Prize winner (2001 Oregonian, 2006 Oregonian with Doug Bates)	
Ann Curry	B.A.	1978	The Today Show anchor; co-host of Dateline NBC	
Abe Deffenbaugh	B.S.	1994	Former publisher for the National Rifle Association; author of outdoor-related magazine articles	
Neil Everett		1984	ESPNEWS and SportsCenter anchor	
Lisa Verch Fletcher	B.S.	1990	Broadcast journalist for WJLA-TV, the ABC-affiliated television station in Washington, D.C.	
Francesca Fontana	B.A.	2017	Journalist and memoirist; former reporter for The Wall Street Journal; author of The Family Snitch	
Thomas Hager	M.A.		Journalist	
John Hockenberry		1981	Journalist; four-time Emmy Award winner; three-time Peabody Award winner	
Polly Irungu	B.A.	2017	Photographer and journalist; founder of Black Women Photographers; official photo editor for the office of US Vice President Kamala Harris	
Mike Lamond	attended		StarCraft II professional commentator and player	
Lars Larson	attended	1977–1979	Syndicated radio talk show host, political pundit (KEX (AM), FOX News)	
Nancy Loo	B.S.	1986	Broadcast journalist for WGN America	
John Markoff	M.S.	1975	Journalist	
Kevin McCarey	M.A.	1980	Emmy Award-winning filmmaker for National Geographic Television; author (Islands Under Fire)	
Win McCormack	M.F.A.		Owner of The New Republic; co-founder of Mother Jones; editor-in-chief of Tin House Magazine	
Ted Natt		1963	Pulitzer Prize winner (1981 Longview Daily News with staff)	
Randy Shilts	B.S.	1975	Journalist; first openly gay reporter at a major American newspaper (the San Francisco Chronicle); author of three best-selling nonfiction books: The Mayor of Castro Street, And the Band Played On, and Conduct Unbecoming	
Alex Tizon	B.S.	1994	Pulitzer Prize winner (1997 Seattle Times with Eric Nalder and Deborah Nelson)	
Mark Zusman	M.S.	1978	Journalist; editor; winner of Gerald Loeb Award; was editor of the Willamette Week; one of his reporters made it the only weekly to ever win the Pulitzer Prize for Investigative Reporting (2005, Nigel Jaquiss)	

== History and humanities ==
Name	Degree(s)	Year(s)	Notability	Reference
LaWanda Cox	B.A.	1931	Historian, Hunter College	
Dennis Jenkins	Ph.D.	1991	Archaeologist	
Huping Ling	M.A.	1987	History professor at Truman State University, author	
Fredrik Logevall	M.A.	1989	Historian, Pulitzer Prize winner	
Nicholas V. Riasanovsky	B.A.	1942	Professor emeritus of European History at University of California, Berkeley	
W. Sherman Savage	M.A.	1926	History professor at Lincoln University in Missouri; first African American to graduate from the University of Oregon	
Brian Swimme	Ph.D.	1978	Professor at California Institute of Integral Studies	
Angela Yang	M.L.S.		Former president of Chinese American Librarians Association 1992–1993, multicultural services and outreach services librarian	

== Military ==
Name	Degree(s)	Year(s)	Notability	Reference
George L. Bartlett	B.S.	1951	Brigadier general, USMC; veteran of three wars	
William E. Birkhimer	LL.D.	1889	Recipient of the Medal of Honor	
Creed C. Hammond		1896	Major general, US Army	
David E. Jeremiah	B.S.	1955	Vice chairman of the Joint Chiefs of Staff, acting chairman of the Joint Chiefs of Staff, admiral, US Navy	
Donald Malarkey	B.S.	1948	Sergeant in Easy Company of the 101st Airborne; was in Stephen E. Ambrose's book Band of Brothers, made into an HBO miniseries	
Charles C. Pixley	M.D.	1946	Lieutenant general, US Army	
Herbert B. Powell	B.S.	1927	General, US Army	
Raymond F. Rees	J.D.	1976	Major general, US Army	
William B. Rosson	B.S.	1940	General, US Army	
Mary Josephine Shelly	B.A.		Lieutenant, WAVES, US Navy; colonel, United States Air Force	
Rodger W. Simpson	attended		Rear admiral, US Navy	
Tammy Smith	B.S.	1986	Brigadier general, US Army	
Gordon Arthur Stanley	attended	1943	Lieutenant commander, US Navy, ace	
James B. Thayer	B.S.	1940–42, 1947	Brigadier general, US Army	

== Politics and law ==
=== Heads of state ===
Name	Degree(s)	Year(s)	Notability	Reference
Dinesh Gunawardena	B.B.A	1972	Prime minister of Sri Lanka	
Hilda Heine	B.A.	1974	President of the Marshall Islands	

=== Governors ===
Name	Degree(s)	Year(s)	Notability	Reference
Victor G. Atiyeh	attended		Former governor of Oregon	
Neil Goldschmidt	B.A.	1963	Former governor of Oregon and mayor of Portland, Oregon	
Robert D. Holmes		1932	Former governor of Oregon	
Len Jordan	B.A.	1923	Former governor of Idaho and former US senator	
John Kitzhaber	M.D.	1973	Former governor of Oregon	
Tina Kotek	B.S.	1990	Governor of Oregon	
Tom McCall	B.S.	1936	Former governor of Oregon; television reporter and commentator for KGW and KATU in Portland	
Julius L. Meier	LL.B	1895	Former governor of Oregon	
Paul L. Patterson	B.A. J.D.	1923; 1926	Former governor of Oregon; president of the Oregon State Senate	

=== Judges ===
Name	Degree(s)	Year(s)	Notability	Reference
Robert S. Bean	B.S.	1878	Former Oregon Supreme Court chief justice	
David V. Brewer	J.D.	1977	Oregon Supreme Court justice	
Oliver Perry Coshow		1885	Former Oregon Supreme Court chief justice	
Alfred Goodwin	B.A. J.D.	1949; 1951	Former Oregon Supreme Court justice	
Jim Jones	B.A.	1964	Chief justice of Idaho Supreme Court; former attorney general of Idaho	
Earl C. Latourette		1912	Former Oregon Supreme Court chief justice	
John Hugh McNary		1894	Former federal judge for the United States District Court for the District of Oregon in Portland	
Edwin J. Peterson	B.S. LL.B	1951; 1957	Former Oregon Supreme Court chief justice	
Hollie Pihl	Bachelor's of ?	c. 1952	Circuit court Judge	
David Schuman	J.D.	1984	Oregon Court of Appeals judge	
Thomas Tongue	J.D.	1937	Former Oregon Supreme Court justice	
Martha Lee Walters	J.D.	1977	Oregon Supreme Court justice	
Walter C. Winslow	B.A.	1906	Oregon Supreme Court justice pro tempore	

=== Legislators ===
Name	Degree(s)	Year(s)	Notability	Reference
Robert Ackerman	Law	1963	Oregon state representative	
Homer D. Angell	B.A.	1900	Former US representative from Oregon	
Emery Barnes	B.S.	1954	Former speaker of the Legislative Assembly of British Columbia, Canada	
Alexander G. Barry	LL.B	1917	Former US senator from Oregon	
Jim Battin	B.A.	1985	Former California state senator	
Suzanne Bonamici	B.S. J.D.	1980; 1983	US representative from Oregon	
Walt Brown	M.L.S.	1975	Former Oregon state senator	
Peter DeFazio	M.A.	1977	US representative from Oregon	
Verne Duncan	Ph.D.	1968	Former Oregon state senator	
Edwin R. Durno	B.S.	1921	US representative from Oregon	
Harris Ellsworth	B.A.	1922	Former Oregon state senator and US representative from Oregon	
Nancie Fadeley	M.A.	1974	Oregon state legislator	
Debi Farr		c. 1974	Oregon state representative	
Ted Ferrioli	B.A.	1973	Oregon state senator	
Peter Fonseca	B.A.		Member of Parliament in the House of Commons of Canada (2015–); member of Provincial Parliament in the Legislative Assembly of Ontario (2003–2011)	
Edith Green	B.A.	1939	Former US representative from Oregon	
Kenzaburo Hara	M.A.		Japan's second longest-serving legislator	
Elaine Hopson	PhD	1988	Oregon state legislator	
Franklin F. Korell		1910	Former US representative from Oregon	
James F. Lloyd	attended		Former US representative from California	
Clifton N. McArthur	B.A.	1901	Former US representative from Oregon	
Frederick W. Mulkey		1896	Former US senator from Oregon	
Maurine Brown Neuberger	B.A.	1929	First female US senator from Oregon	
Richard L. Neuberger		1935	Former US senator from Oregon	
Howard C. Nielson	M.S.	1949	Former US representative from Utah	
A. Walter Norblad	J.D.	1932	Former US representative from Oregon	
Ron Packard	D.M.D.	1957	Former US representative from California	
Alfred E. Reames	B.A.		Former US senator	
William V. Roth, Jr.	B.A.	1944	Former US senator and member of House of Representatives from Delaware; legislative sponsor of the individual retirement account plan, the Roth IRA, named for him; served as chairman of U.S. Senate Committee on Finance	
Paul Simon	attended		Former US senator from Illinois	
Pete Simpson	Ph.D.		Former member of the Wyoming House of Representatives and administrator at the University of Wyoming	
Jefferson Smith	B.S.	1996	Political activist and former state legislator	
Sue Rieke Smith	Doctorate	2015	Teacher and state legislator	
Vic Snyder	M.D.	1979	Former US representative from Arkansas	
Frederick Steiwer	B.A.	1906	Former US senator from Oregon	
Clark W. Thompson	attended		US representative from Texas	
Greg Walden	B.S.	1981	US representative from Oregon	
James H. Weaver	B.S.	1952	Former US representative from Oregon	
Ben Westlund	attended		Oregon state senator	
Wendell Wyatt	LL.B.	1941	Former US representative from Oregon	
Ron Wyden	J.D.	1974	US senator and former representative from Oregon	

=== Mayors ===
Name	Degree(s)	Year(s)	Notability	Reference
Sam Adams	B.A.	2002	Former mayor of Portland, Oregon	
Ryan Coonerty		1996	Former mayor of Santa Cruz, California	
Marko Dapcevich		1991	Mayor of Sitka, Alaska	
Ivor Dent	Ph.D.	1962	Former mayor of Edmonton, Alberta, Canada	
Tom Hughes	B.S.	1965	Former mayor of Hillsboro, Oregon	
John Ssebaana Kizito	M.A.	1962	Mayor of Kampala, Uganda	
Alan Lowe	M.Arch	1985	Former mayor of Victoria, British Columbia	
Connie McCready		1943	Former mayor of Portland, Oregon	
Charles Royer	B.S.	1966	Former mayor of Seattle, Washington	

=== Diplomats ===
Name	Degree(s)	Year(s)	Notability	Reference
George Edward Glass	B.S.	1980	U.S. ambassador to Portugal	
Carol Hallett		1959	Former U.S. ambassador to the Bahamas	
Yosuke Matsuoka	LL.B	1900	International war criminal and influential Japanese foreign minister during World War II	
Terence McCulley	B.A.	1979	Former U.S. ambassador to the Côte d'Ivoire, Nigeria, and Republic of Mali	
Michael Retzer	B.A.	1968	U.S. ambassador to the United Republic of Tanzania	
Victor L. Tomseth	B.A.	1963	Former U.S. ambassador to the Lao People's Democratic Republic	
Witold Waszczykowski	M.A.	1991	Former minister of foreign affairs of Poland and Polish ambassador to Iran	
Kent Wiedemann	M.A.	1973	Former U.S. ambassador to the Kingdom of Cambodia	

=== Other politicians, activists and whistleblowers ===
Name	Degree(s)	Year(s)	Notability	Reference
Aisha al-Mana	B.S.	1970	Women's rights activist in Saudi Arabia	
Peter Buxtun	B.A.	1959	Whistleblower responsible for ending the unethical Tuskegee syphilis experiment	
Mabel Byrd	attended		Civil rights activist	
Donald Hodel	J.D.	1960	Former secretary of energy and former secretary of the interior for the Reagan administration	
Richard James Kerr	B.A.	1959	Former acting director of the CIA, September–November 1991; former deputy director of the CIA 1989–1992	
Hardy Myers	LL.B.	1964	Former attorney general of Oregon	
Theodora Nathan	B.A.	1971	First woman to receive an electoral vote in a US presidential election; a founder of the Libertarian Party	
Nguyen Thien Nhan	M.P.A.	1995	Current party secretary (de facto leader) of Ho Chi Minh City; former deputy prime minister and minister of education	
Steve Novick	B.A.	1981	City of Portland commissioner	
Ellen Rosenblum	B.S. J.D.	1971; 1975	Attorney general of Oregon	
Betty Gram Swing	attended		Women's suffrage activist	
Susan Sygall	B.S.	1947	Disability rights activist	
Robert Y. Thornton	Postdoc	1995	Former attorney general of Oregon	
Minoru Yasui	B.A. LL.B.	1937; 1939	Activist against discriminatory laws against Japanese Americans during World War II	
Ryan Zinke	B.S.	1984	52nd US secretary of the interior; U.S. representative for Montana's at-large congressional district 2015–2017	

== Science, technology and psychology ==
Name	Degree(s)	Year(s)	Notability	Reference
Amir Aczel	Ph.D.	1982	Author of science and mathematics	
Raymond Delacy Adams	Bachelors	1933	Neurologist and Fellow of the American Academy of Arts and Sciences	
Geoffrey R. Ball	B.S.	1987	Physiologist; co-founder of Symphonix Devices Inc., which pioneered the development of middle ear implants	
David M. Beazley	M.S.	1993	Computer scientist, Python developer, and author	
Kent Beck	B.S., M.S.	1987	Software engineer, creator of the Extreme Programming and Test Driven Development software development methodologies, also named agile software development	
Pamela J. Bjorkman	B.A.	1971	Biochemist; pioneer in x-ray crystallography; Max Delbruck Professor of Biology at California Institute of Technology	
Walter Houser Brattain	M.A.	1926	Co-winner of 1956 Nobel Prize in Physics, co-inventor of the transistor	
Clifford E. Brubaker	Ph.D.	1968	Founding member and former president of the Rehabilitation Engineering and Assistive Technology Society of North America	
Anthony W. Case	B.S.	2004	Developed devices to measure the solar wind used on the Parker Solar Probe and other unmanned spacecraft	
Robert S. Cunningham	M.S. Ph.D.	1969	Professor emeritus of computer science at CSU Stanislaus	
Stanislas Dehaene	Postdoc		Neuroscientist in numerical cognition	
Sarah Donaldson	B.S., R.N.	1961	Pediatric radiation oncologist	
Ann E. Elsner	Ph.D.	1977	Researcher and Distinguished Professor of Optometry, Indiana University Bloomington	
Anne Fernald	PhD	1982	Psychologist at Stanford University	
Richard Gordon	Ph.D.	1967	Theoretical biologist; pioneer in image processing; professor of Radiology at University of Manitoba	
N. Gregory Hamilton	B.A.	1971	Psychiatrist and proponent of assisted suicide	
Douglas Hofstadter	M.S. Ph.D.	1972; 1975	Professor of cognitive science; winner of the Pulitzer Prize for General Nonfiction (1980); author of Gödel, Escher, Bach: an Eternal Golden Braid	
Jesse Jenkins	B.S.	2006	Professor at Princeton University, known for work on net-zero emissions;	
Stacey Kiser	M.S.		Professor at Lane Community College	
Anthony Leiserowitz	M.S. Ph.D.		Director of the Yale Project on Climate Change Communication	
Daniel Levitin	M.S. Ph.D.	1993; 1996	Cognitive scientist	
Esther Pohl Lovejoy	M.D.	1894	Early female physician; women's suffrage activist	
William Murphy	B.A.	1914	Co-winner of 1934 Nobel Prize in Physiology or Medicine	
PZ Myers	Ph.D.	1985	Biologist and noted science blogger	
Harry F. Noller	Ph.D.	1985	Biochemist; director of the UC Santa Cruz's Center for the Molecular Biology of RNA; made significant contributions to our understanding of the ribosome; member of the National Academy of Sciences	
Loren Pankratz	Ph.D.	1968	Psychologist, former professor at Oregon Health Sciences University	
Michael Posner	Postdoc	1985	Neuroscientist	
Leopold Pospisil	M.A.	1952	Anthropologist, former professor at Yale University	
Vladimir Rojansky	M.A.	1925	Physicist, known for work on antimatter	
Raemer Schreiber	M.A.	1932	Physicist, known for work on Manhattan Project	
Joseph Takahashi	Ph.D.	1981	Discovered the CLOCK gene	
Rebecca Wirfs-Brock	B.A.		Software engineer and consultant; founder of the information technology consulting firm Wirfs-Brock Associates; inventor of Responsibility-Driven Design	

== Sports ==
=== Basketball ===
Name	Degree(s)	Year(s)	Notability	Reference
Greg Ballard	B.S.	1977	Former NBA forward	
Jim Barnett	B.S.	1966	Former NBA guard-forward	
Jordan Bell	attended		NBA forward for the Golden State Warriors	
Terrell Brandon		1991	Former NBA guard	
Aaron Brooks	B.S.	2007	NBA guard for the Phoenix Suns	
Dillon Brooks	attended		NBA swingman for the Memphis Grizzlies	
Mark Few	B.S.	1987	Current head basketball coach at Gonzaga University	
Lauren Gale		1939	Naismith Memorial Basketball Hall of Fame member	
Ruthy Hebard			WNBA forward for the Chicago Sky; first-round pick in the 2020 WNBA draft; two-time recipient (2018, 2020) of the Katrina McClain Award as the top power forward in NCAA Division I women's basketball	
Howard Hobson	B.S.	1926	Naismith Memorial Basketball Hall of Fame member; former basketball head coach for the Oregon Ducks and Yale Bulldogs	
Sabrina Ionescu	B.A. M.A.	2019; 2020	Current WNBA player with the New York Liberty; top pick in the 2020 WNBA draft; recipient of multiple NCAA Division I national player of the year awards in 2019 and 2020	
Luke Jackson	B.S.	2004	Former NBA forward with the Portland Trail Blazers	
Stu Jackson		1980	Former NBA head coach, current NBA executive	
Tom Jernstedt	B.S. M.S.	1964; 1973	Naismith Memorial Basketball Hall of Fame member; architect of March Madness	
Fred Jones		2002	Former NBA guard with the New York Knicks	
Ernie Kent	B.S.	1977	Former basketball head coach for the Oregon Ducks	
Ron Lee	B.S.	1976	Former NBA guard	
Jim Loscutoff		1955	Former NBA forward	
Stan Love		1971	Former NBA forward; father of current NBA forward Kevin Love and younger brother of Beach Boys founding member Mike Love	
Blair Rasmussen	B.S.	1985	Former NBA center	
Luke Ridnour	attended		NBA Point Guard for the Minnesota Timberwolves	
Satou Sabally	B.A.	2020	WNBA forward for the Dallas Wings; chosen second (behind Ionescu) in the 2020 WNBA draft; 2020 recipient of the Cheryl Miller Award as the top small forward in NCAA Division I women's basketball	
Zollie Volchok		1939	Former general manager of the Seattle SuperSonics; winner of the 1983 NBA Executive of the Year Award	

- Tyler Dorsey (born 1996), Greek–American basketball player in the Israeli Basketball Premier League
- L. J. Figueroa (born 1998), Dominican-American basketball player in the Israeli Basketball Premier League
- Roman Sorkin (born 1996), Israeli basketball player in the Israeli Basketball Premier League
- Jamil Wilson (born 1990), basketball player for Hapoel Jerusalem in the Israeli Basketball Premier League

=== Football ===
Full list of former University of Oregon players who have played football professionally

Full list of former University of Oregon players who are currently playing in the NFL

Name	Degree(s)	Year(s)	Notability	Reference
Evan Baylis			NFL tight end	
Bob Berry		1964	Former Pro Bowl NFL quarterback	
Josh Bidwell	B.A.	1998	Pro Bowl NFL punter with the Washington Redskins	
Jairus Byrd	attended	2008	Pro Bowl NFL safety for the Carolina Panthers	
Patrick Chung	B.S.	2008	Safety for the New England Patriots	
Kellen Clemens	B.S.	2006	NFL quarterback with the San Diego Chargers	
Gunther Cunningham	B.S.	1969	Former head coach of the Kansas City Chiefs	
Dennis Dixon	B.S.	2007	NFL quarterback with the Philadelphia Eagles	
Reuben Droughns		2000	NFL running back with the New York Giants	
A.J. Feeley		2000	NFL quarterback with the St. Louis Rams	
Dan Fouts	B.S.	1977	Pro Football Hall of Fame member; former six-time Pro Bowl NFL quarterback; ABC television sports announcer	
Russ Francis		1975	Former three-time Pro Bowl NFL tight end	
Mike Gaechter	B.S.	1962	Former NFL safety for the Dallas Cowboys	
Roy Gagnon			NFL guard for the Detroit Lions	
Dave Grayson	B.S.	1960	Former AFL / NFL safety for the Kansas City Chiefs and Oakland Raiders	
Tony Hargain			Former NFL wide receiver for the San Francisco 49ers	
Joey Harrington	B.S.	2002	Former NFL quarterback with the Detroit Lions, Miami Dolphins, Atlanta Falcons and New Orleans Saints	
Josh Huff	B.S.	2013	NFL wide receiver with the Philadelphia Eagles	
Shy Huntington	B.S.	1924	Former football, basketball, and baseball head coach for the Oregon Ducks	
Dick James		1956	Former Pro Bowl NFL running back	
LaMichael James		2011	NFL running back with the Miami Dolphins; Doak Walker Award winner	
June Jones	attended		Head coach of the SMU Mustangs; former head coach of the Atlanta Falcons and Hawaii Warriors	
Tuffy Leemans	attended		Pro Football Hall of Fame member; former NFL running back for the New York Giants	
Jeff Lockie			Oregon Ducks quarterback	
Jeff Maehl		2010	NFL wide receiver with the Philadelphia Eagles	
George Martin		1975	Former NFL defensive end for the New York Giants	
Casey Matthews		2010	NFL linebacker with the Philadelphia Eagles	
John McKay	B.S.	1950	Former head coach of the Tampa Bay Buccaneers and the USC Trojans	
Chris Miller		1987	Former NFL quarterback	
Alex Molden	B.S.	1998	Former NFL cornerback	
Maurice Morris		2002	NFL running back with the Detroit Lions	
Bill Musgrave		1990	NFL quarterback and offensive coordinator	
Anthony Newman		2002	Former NFL defensive back with the Los Angeles Rams, New Orleans Saints and Oakland Raiders	
Haloti Ngata	attended		Two-time Pro Bowl NFL defensive tackle with the Detroit Lions	
John Nisby			Former NFL guard with the Pittsburgh Steelers and the Washington Redskins	
Mike Nolan	B.S.	1981	Former head coach of the San Francisco 49ers	
Igor Olshansky	B.S.	2004	NFL defensive tackle with the Miami Dolphins	
Jack Patera	B.S.	1955	Former head coach of the Seattle Seahawks	
Fred Quillan		1977	Former two-time Pro Bowl NFL center with the San Francisco 49ers and San Diego Chargers	
Ahmad Rashad	B.Ed	1972	Former four-time Pro Bowl NFL wide receiver, Emmy Award-winning sportscaster	
Mel Renfro	B.S.	1964	Pro Football Hall of Fame member; former ten-time Pro Bowl; five-time All-Pro NFL cornerback	
John Robinson	B.S.	1960	Former head coach of the Los Angeles Rams and USC Trojans	
Dante Rosario	B.S.	2006	NFL tight end with the Carolina Panthers	
Brett Salisbury	attended	1991	Former quarterback and sports nutrition author	
Geoffrey Isaiah Schwartz	B.S.	2008	NFL offensive tackle with the Kansas City Chiefs	
Akili Smith	B.S.	1999	Former NFL quarterback	
Onterrio Smith	attended		Former NFL halfback	
Adam Snyder	B.S.	2005	NFL offensive tackle for the San Francisco 49ers	
Bruce Snyder	B.S.	1963	Former head coach of the California Golden Bears and the Arizona State Sun Devils	
Jonathan Stewart	attended		NFL running back with the Carolina Panthers	
Darron Thomas		2011		
De'Anthony Thomas	attended	2013	NFL running back with the Kansas City Chiefs	
Norv Turner	B.S.	1976	Offensive coordinator of the Cleveland Browns; former head coach of the San Diego Chargers, Washington Redskins and Oakland Raiders	
Max Unger		2008	Pro Bowl NFL center with the Seattle Seahawks	
Norm Van Brocklin	B.S. M.S.	1949; 1951	Pro Football Hall of Fame member, former nine-time Pro Bowl NFL quarterback	
Michael Walter	B.S.	1982	Former NFL linebacker for the Dallas Cowboys and San Francisco 49ers	
Dave Wilcox		1965	Pro Football Hall of Fame member, former seven-time Pro Bowl NFL linebacker	
Josh Wilcox			NFL tight end with the New Orleans Saints	
Demetrius Williams		2006	NFL wide receiver with the Cleveland Browns	
George Wrighster	attended		Former NFL tight end with the New York Giants	
Brett Young	attended		Former CFL defensive back	
Gary Zimmerman	B.S.	1986	Pro Football Hall of Fame member, former seven-time Pro Bowl NFL offensive lineman	

=== Track and field ===
Name	Degree(s)	Year(s)	Notability	Reference
Keshia Baker		2010	2012 Summer Olympics gold medalist in the 4 × 400 m relay	
Mike Boit	Ph.D.	1986	1972 Summer Olympics bronze medalist in the 800m	
Bill Bowerman	B.S. M.Ed.	1934; 1953	Former track and field head coach for the Oregon Ducks	
Doug Clement	B.Sc.	1955	Canadian sprinter and proponent of fitness and sports medicine	
Joaquim Cruz	attended		1984 Summer Olympics gold medalist; 1988 Summer Olympics silver medalist in the 800m	
Otis Davis	B.S.	1960	1960 Summer Olympics gold medalist in the 400m and 4x400 relay	
Mary Decker		1980	Record-setting long-distance runner	
Bill Dellinger	B.S. M.Ed.	1956; 1962	1964 Summer Olympics bronze medalist in the 5000m; former track and field head coach for the Oregon Ducks	
Ashton Eaton	B.A.	2010	World record holder in the decathlon with 9045 points in 2015 and the heptathlon with 6499 points in 2010, 6568 points in 2011 and 6645 points in 2012; 2012 Summer Olympics and 2016 Summer Olympics gold medalist in the decathlon	
Ken Flax	B.S.	1986	Two-time Olympian, record-setting hammer thrower	
Martin Hawkins	LL.B	1913	1912 Summer Olympics bronze medalist in the 100m hurdles	
Ralph Hill	B.S.	1931	1932 Summer Olympics silver medalist in the 5000m	
Cyrus Hostetler	B.S.	2010	Javelin thrower at the 2012 Summer Olympics	
Harry Jerome	M.S.	1963; 1968	1964 Summer Olympics bronze medalist in the 100m, world record holder	
Daniel Kelly		1908	1908 Summer Olympics silver medalist in the long jump	
Steve Prefontaine	B.S.	1974	Record-setting long-distance runner, Olympian	
Mack Robinson	attended	1941	1936 Summer Olympics silver medalist in the 200m	
Galen Rupp	B.A.	2009	2012 Summer Olympics silver medalist in the 10,000 meters; inaugural winner of the Bowerman Award	
Alberto Salazar	B.A.	1981	Marathon runner and coach	
Brianne Theisen-Eaton	B.S.	2012	Canadian record holder in the heptathlon with 6808 points in 2015 and the indoor pentathlon with 4881 points in 2016; 2016 World Indoor Track and Field Championships gold medalist in the pentathlon; 2016 Summer Olympics Bronze medalist in the heptathlon	
Mac Wilkins	B.S.	1973	World record holder in the discus throw; 1976 Summer Olympics gold medalist; 1984 Summer Olympics silver medalist in the discus throw	

=== Other sports ===
Name	Degree(s)	Year(s)	Notability	Reference
Tyler Anderson		2011	Major League Baseball pitcher for the Seattle Mariners	
Earl Averill	B.S.	1953	Baseball Hall of Fame outfielder for the Cleveland Indians	
Ann Bancroft	B.S.	1981	First woman to reach the North Pole on foot and by dogsled	
Martenne Bettendorf	B.A.	2016	Volleyball player	
Wyndham Clark			Golfer, winner of the 2023 U.S. Open	
Garrett Cleavinger			Major League Baseball pitcher for the Los Angeles Dodgers	
Ben Crane	B.S.	1999	Professional golfer	
Clare Drake	attended	1968	Ice hockey coach and member of the Hockey Hall of Fame	
Evan Dunham	B.S.	2004	NCAA wrestler, retired professional MMA fighter for the UFC's Lightweight Division	
Peter Foley			Former snowboarding coach; suspended for 10 years for sexual misconduct	
Greg Gibson		1978	1984 Summer Olympics silver medalist in wrestling	
Joe Gordon	B.S.	1939	Baseball Hall of Famer second baseman with the New York Yankees and Cleveland Indians	
Bob Hindmarch	M.S. Ph.D.	1959; 1962	Director of physical education at the University of British Columbia, inducted into the Canadian Olympic Hall of Fame, member of the Order of Canada	
Peter Jacobsen		1977	Professional golfer	
Dave Jansen	attended		NCAA collegiate wrestler; professional MMA fighter formerly with the WEC and Bellator	
Georges Larivière	MSc	1968	Ice hockey coach, professor, writer, and sports administrator	
Yohanan Moyal			Israeli Olympic gymnast	
Jake Reed			Major League Baseball pitcher for the Los Angeles Dodgers	
Dave Roberts		1971	MLB first overall draft pick in 1972 by the San Diego Padres	
Tom Shaw		1962	Professional golfer	
Jimmie Sherfy			Major League Baseball pitcher for the Los Angeles Dodgers	
Chael Sonnen	B.S.	2001	NCAA All-American and U.S. Olympic team alternate wrestler, retired professional mixed martial artist, former UFC, Bellator MMA Middleweight, Light Heavyweight and Heavyweight title challenger	
Robert Steadward	Ph.D.		Founder of the International Paralympic Committee	
Paul Sunderland	attended		1984 Summer Olympics gold medalist in men's volleyball	
Zack Test			Rugby union player	
Gary Wiren	Ph.D.		Golfer and golf instructor	
Carolyn Wood	B.A.	1967	1960 Summer Olympics gold medalist in the 4 × 100 m freestyle relay in swimming	

== See also ==
- Lists of Oregon-related topics
- List of University of Oregon faculty and staff
- Oregon Ducks
