= Jack Bergman =

American politician (born 1947)

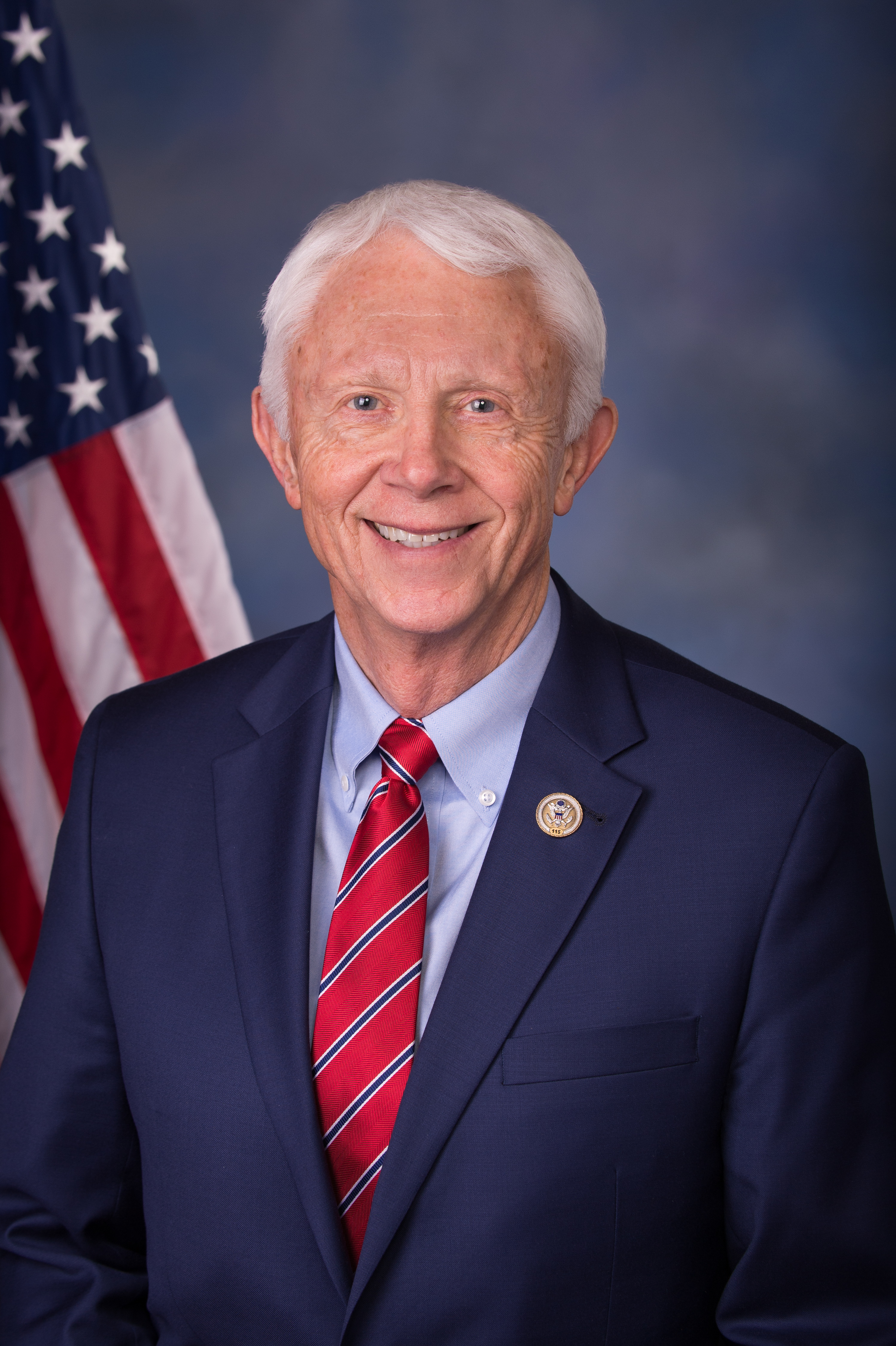
- Official portrait, 2017

Member of the U.S. House of Representatives from Michigan's 1st district
- Incumbent
- Assumed office January 3, 2017
- Preceded by: Dan Benishek

Personal details
- Born: John Warren Bergman; February 2, 1947 (age 79) Shakopee, Minnesota, U.S.
- Party: Republican
- Spouse: Cindy Bergman
- Children: 5
- Education: Gustavus Adolphus College (BA); University of West Florida (MBA)
- Website: House website Campaign website

Military service
- Branch/service: United States Marine Corps; Marine Corps Reserve
- Years of service: 1969–2009
- Rank: Lieutenant General
- Bergman's voice Bergman supporting the FY2019 National Defense Authorization Act; Recorded May 22, 2018

John Warren Bergman (born February 2, 1947) is an American politician and retired United States Marine Corps lieutenant general serving as the U.S. representative from Michigan's 1st congressional district since 2017. He is a member of the Republican Party.

He served as commanding general of the Marine Forces Reserve and the Marine Forces North. He also served as a naval aviator, flying rotary-winged aircraft such as the CH-46 and UH-1, as well as fixed-wing aircraft such as the T-28 and KC-130.

== Early life and education ==
Bergman was born on February 2, 1947, in Shakopee, Minnesota, and received his Bachelor of Arts degree in business from Gustavus Adolphus College in 1969. He subsequently earned a Master of Business Administration degree from the University of West Florida. His formal military education includes Naval Aviation Flight Training, Amphibious Warfare School, Marine Corps Command and Staff College, Landing Force Staff Planning (Marine Expeditionary Brigade [MEB] and Air Command Element [ACE]), Reserve Component National Security and Naval War College Strategy & Policy, Syracuse University National Security Seminar, Combined Forces Air Component Command, LOGTECH, and CAPSTONE.

== Military career ==
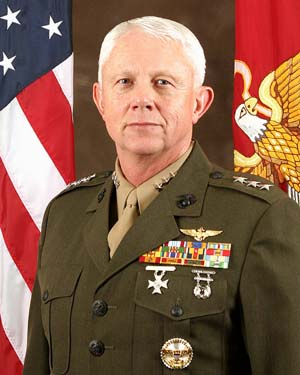
Bergman in uniform

After graduating from college, Bergman was commissioned as a second lieutenant in the Marine Corps Reserve in 1969 under the Platoon Leaders Course program for aviation (PLC-Air) and entered active duty. Due to the need for pilots during the Vietnam War, Bergman did not attend The Basic School (TBS) at MCB Quantico, Virginia and was sent directly to flight training at NAS Pensacola and NAS Whiting Field, Florida, he was designated as a Naval Aviator.

He then flew CH-46 helicopters with HMM-261 at Marine Corps Air Station New River, North Carolina, and with HMM-164 at MCAS Futenma in Okinawa, Japan, and the Republic of Vietnam. Later assigned shore duty as a flight instructor, he flew T-28s with Training Squadron Six (VT-6) at NAS Whiting Field, Florida. He left active duty in 1975 and flew UH-1 helicopters with the Rhode Island Army National Guard, at the former NAS Quonset Point in Quonset Point, Rhode Island.

After a 1978 civilian employment transfer to Chicago, Bergman transferred from the Rhode Island Army National Guard back to the Marine Corps Reserve, where he served in several 4th Marine Aircraft Wing units at NAS Glenview, Illinois: HML-776, flying the UH-1; VMGR-234, flying the KC-130; and Mobilization Training Unit IL-1. He was selected to stand up the second KC-130 squadron in 4th MAW and in 1988 became the first commanding officer of VMGR-452 at Stewart Air National Guard Base in Newburgh, New York. From 1992 to 1994 he commanded Mobilization Station, Chicago.

In 1995, he was a special staff officer at Marine Corps Reserve Support Command at Overland Park, Kansas. In 1996, he became chief of staff/deputy commander of I Marine Expeditionary Force Augmentation Command Element, Marine Corps Base Camp Pendleton, California. In 1997, he transferred to the 4th Marine Aircraft Wing Headquarters in New Orleans, Louisiana to serve as assistant chief of staff/G-1. Promoted to brigadier general, he became deputy commanding general of the 4th Marine Aircraft Wing.

Transferred in June 1998 to Headquarters, Marine Forces Europe, Stuttgart, Germany, Bergman served as deputy commander. Recalled to active duty from April to July 1999, he was dual-hatted as EUCOM, Deputy J-3A. He then commanded II Marine Expeditionary Force Augmentation Command Element, Marine Corps Base Camp Lejeune, North Carolina, until assuming command of the 4th Marine Aircraft Wing, New Orleans, Louisiana in August 2000.

In September 2002, Bergman assumed command of the 4th Force Service Support Group, New Orleans, Louisiana. He also served as chairman of the secretary of the Navy's Marine Corps Reserve Policy Board from 2001 to 2003. Returning to active duty in October 2003, he served as director of Reserve Affairs, Quantico, Virginia. He began his final assignment, command of the Marine Forces Reserve/Marine Forces North, on June 10, 2005. He relinquished that command in October 2009 and retired from active duty in December of that year.

== U.S. House of Representatives ==
=== Elections ===
Bergman won the Republican primary in Michigan's 1st congressional district in August 2016. The district covered all of Michigan's Upper Peninsula and the northern part of the Lower Peninsula. He defeated Democratic nominee Lon Johnson and Libertarian nominee Diane Bostow in the November general election. Bergman, who was elected to succeed retiring Republican Representative Dan Benishek, won 55% of the vote to Johnson's 40% and Bostow's 4%.

Bergman ran uncontested in the Republican primary in 2018, and was reelected in the November general election defeating Democratic candidate Matthew Morgan with 56% of the vote. He again ran uncontested for the Republican nomination in the 2020 primary, and defeated Democratic candidate Dana Ferguson in 2020 with 62% of the vote.

The 1st congressional district shifted slightly in the 2020 United States redistricting cycle following the 2020 census, losing Manistee County and part of Mason County, while gaining Missaukee County, Roscommon County, Ogemaw County, Iosco County, Arenac County, and part of Wexford County. This shift did not have a significant impact on the district's political leanings, remaining strongly Republican. In the 2022 election for the new district, Bergman faced only write-in opposition in the Republican primary, and was reelected easily against Democratic candidate Bob Lorinser, winning 60% of the vote.

In 2024, Bergman faced Josh Saul in the Republican primary, winning renomination with 79% of the vote. He defeated Democratic candidate Callie Barr in the general election with 59% of the vote.

In the 2023-2024 election cycle, Bergman received $46,200 from members of the DeVos family, who also contributed substantially to Republican-aligned super PACs. Overall, 36.6% of Bergman's campaign funding was from PACs, 22% from large donors, and 11% from individual contributions under $200.

Representative Jack Bergman announced his candidacy for re-election to the U.S. House of Representatives in the 2026 election. According to Federal Election Commission (FEC) data, his campaign reported record-breaking first quarter fundraising totals for the cycle.

=== Tenure ===
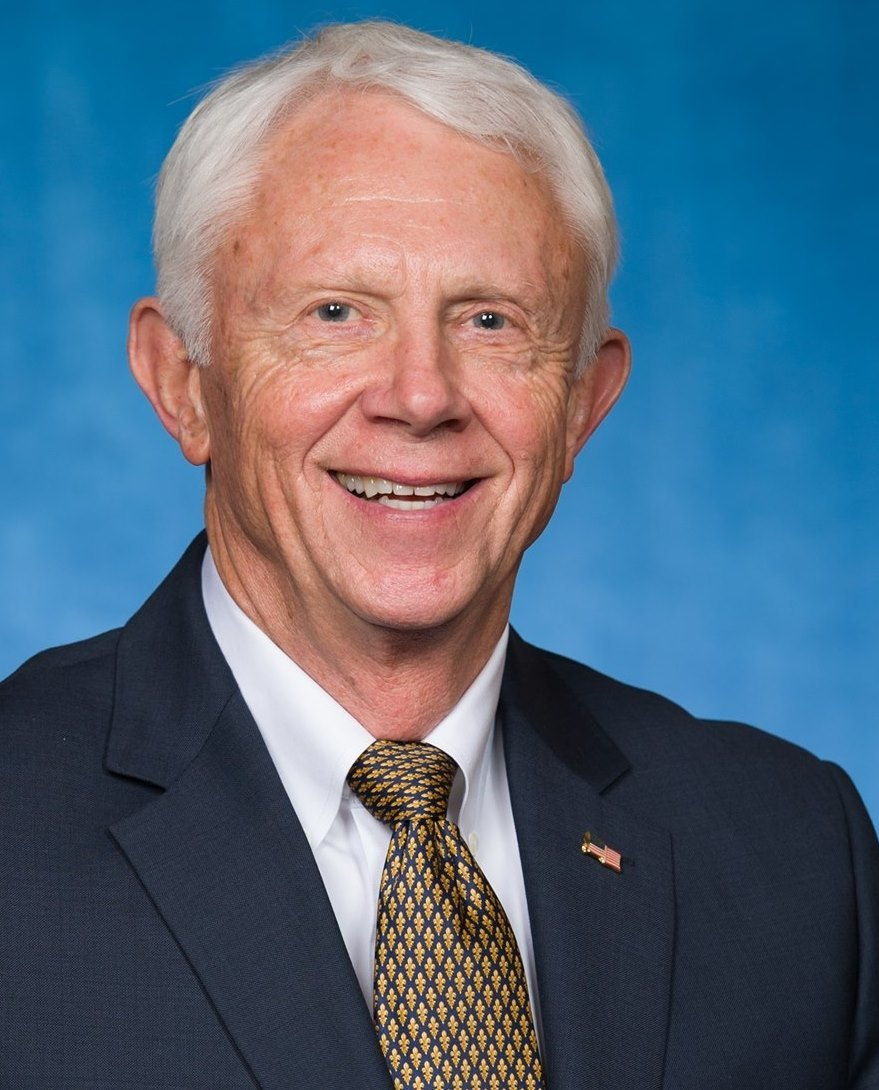
Bergman during the 115th United States Congress

Bergman assumed office on January 3, 2017. He is a member of the Republican Study Committee, the Climate Solutions Caucus and the U.S.–Japan Caucus.

Bergman serves on the House Budget Committee, the House Armed Services Committee, and the House Committee on Veterans Affairs.

In June 2017, Bergman was one of the Republican congressmen who were practicing on an Alexandria, Virginia, baseball field for the annual Congressional Baseball Game when James Hodgkinson began shooting at them, harming four people, including Representative Steve Scalise. Afterward, Bergman blamed the incident on anti-GOP rhetoric and the media.

Bergman voted with President Joe Biden's stated position roughly 6% of the time.

In October 2023, Bergman unsuccessfully ran for Speaker of the House.

In February 2026, Bergman co-led the bipartisan Michigan congressional delegation that secured the designation of Camp Grayling's National All-Domain Warfighting Center as a national range for uncrewed aerial systems testing by the Department of Defense.

=== Constituent Relations ===
Jack Bergman has not held a town hall in his district since 2017. In early 2025, Bergman was criticized for failing to attend "empty seat" town halls hosted by constituents in Escanaba, Houghton, and Traverse City.

=== Committee assignments in 119th Congress ===
- Committee on Armed Services
  - Subcommittee on Readiness
  - Subcommittee on Seapower and Projection Forces
- Committee on the Budget
- Committee on Veterans' Affairs
  - Subcommittee on Health
  - Subcommittee on Disability Assistance and Memorial Affairs

=== Caucus memberships ===
- Republican Study Committee
- Climate Solutions Caucus
- Congressional Caucus on Turkey and Turkish Americans
- U.S.–Japan Caucus.
- Congressional Taiwan Caucus
- Psychedelics Advancing Therapies Caucus

== Political positions ==
=== Spending and budget ===
In March 2016, Bergman said that cutting spending would be his top priority in Congress.

In a July 2016 television interview, Bergman said his three top priorities were to "get Congress working together" instead of being preoccupied with partisan division, to "utilize the Constitution", and to pass a balanced budget amendment.

In March 2021, all House Republicans including Bergman voted against the American Rescue Plan Act of 2021, an economic stimulus bill aimed at speeding up the United States' recovery from the economic and health effects of the COVID-19 pandemic and the ongoing recession.

=== Healthcare ===
Bergman opposes the Affordable Care Act and voted to repeal it in May 2017.

=== Environment ===
In September 2017, Bergman became the 29th Republican to join the Climate Solutions Caucus. However, the League of Conservation Voters (LCV) and the Vote Climate U.S. PAC both give him poor scores for environmental and climate votes. In 2024 Bergman voted against funding to implement the Paris Climate Agreement, though the bill was never taken up by the Senate.

Bergman voted in favor of the Tribal Coastal Resiliency Act, which would allow the Department of Commerce to award grants to Native American tribes for historical preservation, environmental protection, and climate change mitigation in the Great Lakes.

In 2025, Bergman voted to nullify the EPA rule on "National Emission Standards for Hazardous Air Pollutants: Rubber Tire Manufacturing" and the EPA rule on "Waste Emissions Charge for Petroleum and Natural Gas Systems", which would have helped decrease methane emissions, with a net benefits of $180 million.

=== Marriage ===
Bergman voted against the "Respect for Marriage Act" codifying Loving v. Virginia and Obergefell v. Hodges, recognizing marriages across state lines regardless of "sex, race, ethnicity, or national origin of those individuals."

=== Military ===
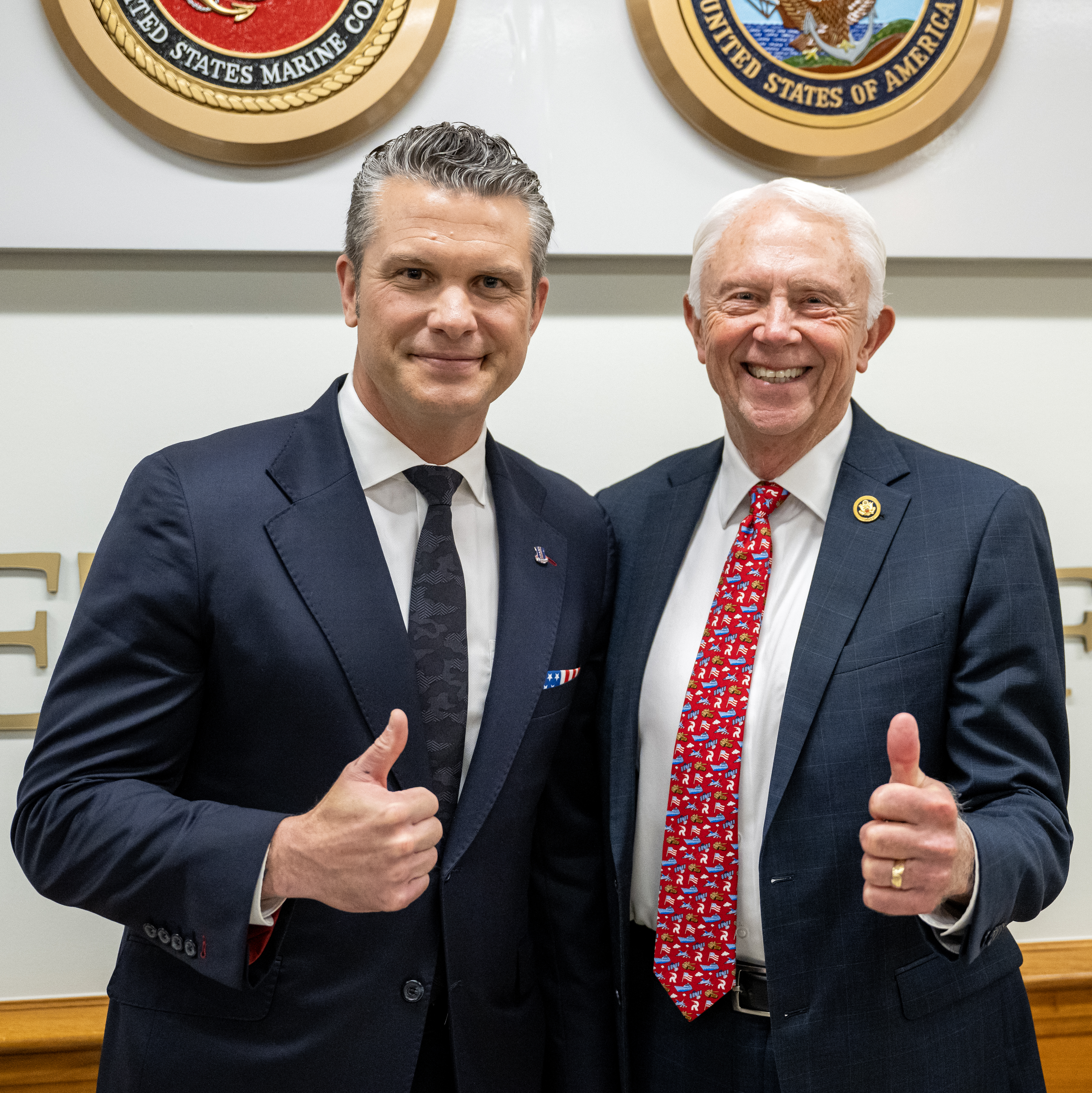
Bergman with Secretary of Defense Pete Hegseth, 2025

In August 2017, Bergman sided with then-President Donald Trump on barring transgender individuals from the military.

=== 2020 presidential election ===
After Joe Biden won the 2020 presidential election and Trump refused to concede, Bergman announced he would oppose the confirmation of the Electoral College's vote in Congress.

In January 2021, Bergman announced his intention to object to the certification of the Electoral College results.

=== Israel ===
Bergman has been a vocal supporter of Israel's right to defend itself and voted to provide Israel with support following the 2023 Hamas attack on Israel.

=== Voter identification and the SAVE Act ===
Jack Bergman has expressed support for the Safeguard American Voter Eligibility (SAVE) Act, proposed federal legislation that would require individuals to provide documentary proof of U.S. citizenship in order to register to vote or cast a ballot in federal elections. Supporters argue that the bill would strengthen election integrity by preventing non-citizens from voting. In April 2025, the U.S. House of Representatives passed the SAVE Act with 220-208. This followed an earlier attempt in 2024 in which a version of the bill passed the House but did not advance in the Senate.

Voting rights scholars and civil rights organizations have criticized the SAVE Act, noting that federal law already prohibits non-citizens from voting in federal elections and that documented instances of non-citizen voting are rare. Critics argue that requiring proof of citizenship—such as a passport or certified birth certificate—would disproportionately burden eligible U.S. citizens who lack ready access to such documents, particularly low-income voters, elderly citizens, racial minorities, rural residents, women whose names have changed, and naturalized citizens.

“I’m proud to have cosponsored this commonsense legislation that passed the House with bipartisan support, albeit slim. Rooted in constitutional reality, the SAVE Act reaffirms what we already know – that only American citizens should be able to vote in American elections. With the worst, most porous borders our country has ever seen, this bill is absolutely necessary to ensure our elections remain free and fair,” Rep. Jack Bergman stated.

Legal scholars and voting-rights advocates have further argued that the costs, delays, and administrative hurdles associated with obtaining citizenship documents may function as a de facto poll tax, which is prohibited under the Twenty-Fourth Amendment to the U.S. Constitution. This is disputed by the GOP.

Reaction to Wildfire Smoke

In July 2026, Jack Bergram jointly penned a letter to Prime Minister Mark Carney demanding immediate action from the Canadian government regarding wildfire smoke originating from wildfires burning nearby in Canada. This letter included language mimicking threats made by the Trump Administration regarding Canada's sovereignty. The letter made no mention of providing support for those affected by the wildfires or providing assistance to those who are working to extinguish the wildfires despite accusing the Canadian government of inaction.

== Awards and decorations ==
Bergman's military awards include:

=== Medals and ribbons ===

Naval Aviator Badge				Office of the Secretary of Defense Identification Badge
Distinguished Service Medal (US Navy)	Defense Meritorious Service Medal	Air Medal w/ Valor device and Strike/Flight numeral "1"	Joint Meritorious Unit Award	Office of the Secretary of Defense Identification Badge
Navy Unit Commendation	Navy Meritorious Unit Commendation w/ 2 bronze service stars	Selected Marine Corps Reserve Medal w/ 1 silver service star	National Defense Service Medal w/ 2 bronze service stars	Office of the Secretary of Defense Identification Badge
Vietnam Service Medal w/ 3 bronze campaign stars	Global War on Terrorism Service Medal	Navy & Marine Corps Overseas Service Ribbon w/ 1 bronze service star	Armed Forces Reserve Medal w/ gold Hourglass Devices	Office of the Secretary of Defense Identification Badge
Vietnam Gallantry Cross w/ bronze star	Vietnam Gallantry Cross Unit Citation w/ bronze laurel leaf palm emblem	Vietnam Civil Actions Unit Citation w/ bronze laurel leaf palm emblem	Vietnam Campaign Medal w/ silver date bar	Office of the Secretary of Defense Identification Badge

== Personal life ==
Jack Bergman is officially listed by congressional records as being “of” Watersmeet, Michigan, and his House biography states that he and his wife settled in the Watersmeet area nearly three decades ago. However, Bergman has also been documented as having a second house in St. Francisville, Louisiana. In a 2013 transcript of a meeting of the Louisiana Military Advisory Council, Bergman identified himself as a “proud resident of St. Francisville.”

His dual-property situation became a subject of public attention in Michigan during the 2016 and 2018 election cycles, when lawsuits and media reports questioned whether his Michigan property qualified for a principal residence tax exemption while he also owned a home in Louisiana. Bergman denied wrongdoing, stated that his primary residence was in Michigan, and said local officials upheld his tax status after reviewing documentation.

Under the U.S. Constitution, members of the U.S. House of Representatives are required to be inhabitants of the state they represent at the time of election, a standard that is distinct from state tax definitions of residency or from where a member may spend substantial portions of the year.

Jack and his wife Cindy have ten grandchildren. Bergman is a Lutheran.

U.S. House of Representatives
Preceded by Dan Benishek	Member of the U.S. House of Representatives from Michigan's 1st congressional district 2017–present	Incumbent
U.S. order of precedence (ceremonial)
Preceded by Nanette Barragán	United States representatives by seniority 158th	Succeeded by Andy Biggs
