= Bedbury =

Bedbury is a surname. Notable people with the surname include:

- Floyd Bedbury (1937–2011), American speed skater
- Scott Bedbury (born 1957), American branding consultant
