= Air Barons =

- Active: Jun 1958 – December 1971
- Country: United States
- Branch: United States Navy
- Type: Douglas A-4 Skyhawk
- Role: Aerobatic flight demonstration team
- Garrison/HQ: NAS Glenview

Commanders
- Current commander: Cmdr. Jim Mahoney

Aircraft flown
- Fighter: 6 – Douglas A-4 Skyhawk

The Air Barons were an aerobatics team of the United States Navy, which was active from 1958 to 1971. The team was initially equipped with Grumman F9F-6 Cougars. The Air Barons were the aerobatics team of the Naval Air Reserve and thus the second aerobatic team of the US Navy along with the Blue Angels.

== History ==
In contrast to the Blue Angels, which also flew the A-4 at the same time, the Air Barons always flew with an additional tank under each wing, while the Blue Angels used external transfer tanks only for transfer flights and carried out the actual flight demonstrations completely without external loads. One of the 6 A-4 also had an air to air refueling unit at the centerlinepylon. In contrast to the full-service military pilots of the Blue Angels, which only operate aerobatics during their classification at the Blue Angels, the pilots of the Air Barons were active as pilots of the Naval Air Reserve only as part-time military pilots. The Air Barons aerobatic team flew 66 official flight demonstrations during its existence.
