= POINT Intercity Bus Service =

Government-funded system in Oregon

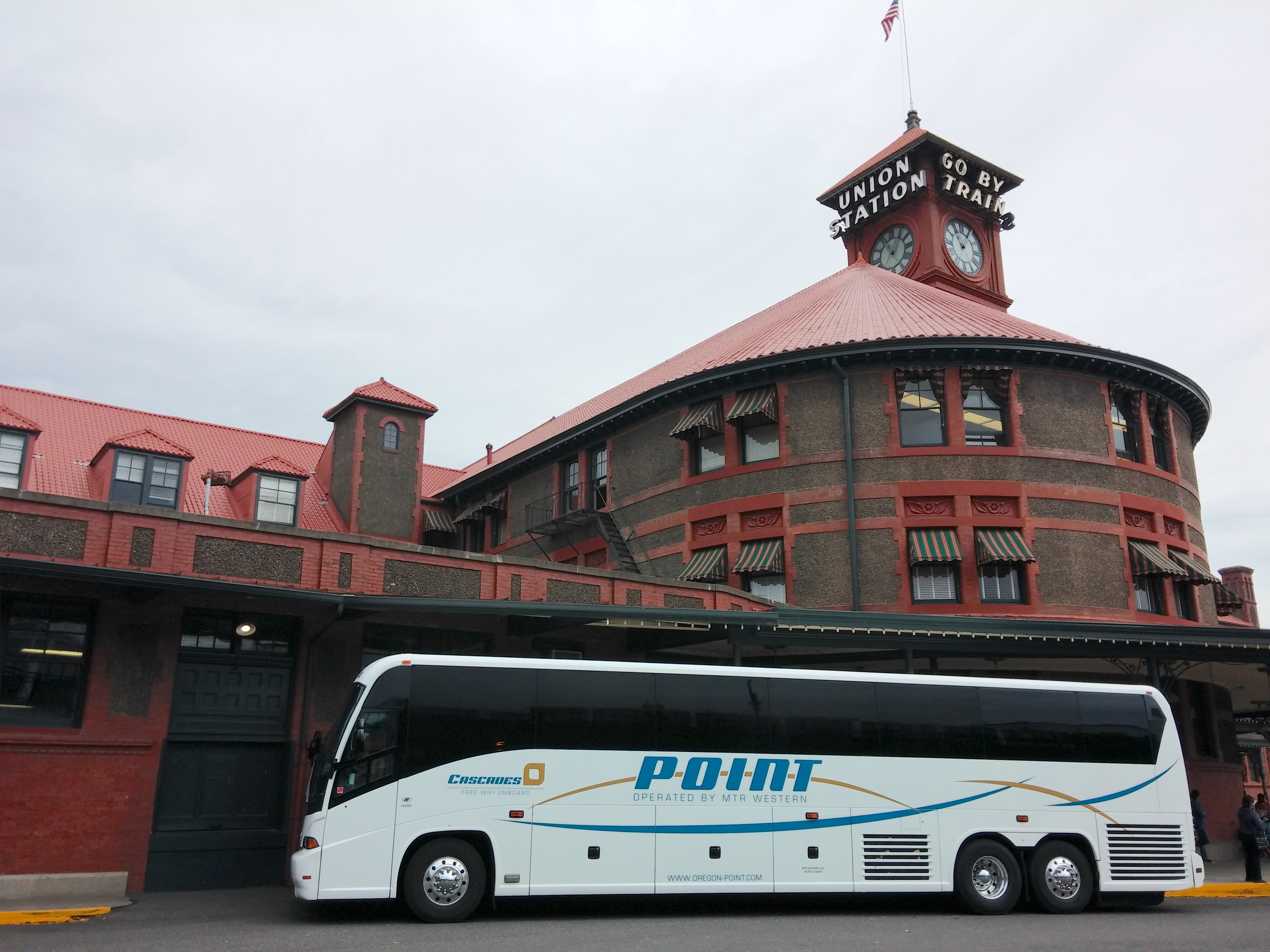
- A POINT bus at Portland Union Station in 2015
- Parent: Oregon Department of Transportation
- Commenced operation: April 2009
- Service area: Oregon
- Service type: Intercity bus
- Routes: 4
- Operator: MTR Western, Pacific Crest Bus Lines, Northwest Navigator
- Website: www.oregon-point.com

The POINT Intercity Bus Service is a four-route, intercity bus service sponsored by the Oregon Department of Transportation (ODOT). The service is administered by ODOT's Public Transportation Division as part of its intercity grant program. The POINT service exists to connect towns and rural communities with major transportation hubs and urban centers. ODOT accomplishes this by filling gaps in Oregon's long distance transit network where no public services exist and which would otherwise be unprofitable for private companies.

Tickets for POINT services are sold through multiple ticketeing systems, including the Amtrak, Greyhound, and FlixBus national networks. When purchasing tickets through Amtrak, POINT services are marketed as part of the Amtrak Thruway network.

== History ==
ODOT began investing heavily in intercity bus services in 1994. The decline in Greyhound service in Oregon in the late 1990s led to a rise in local private operators. Over time, to better meet the travel needs of Oregonians and draw more ridership, ODOT created the POINT program through "a mixture of new service, expanded service and service re-branding that relies on public-private partnerships with private bus operators."

The service is operated by private bus companies under contract to ODOT. MTR Western operates the Cascades and Eastern Routes, Northwest Navigator operates the NorthWest Route, and Pacific Crest Bus Lines operates the SouthWest Route.

In 2019, the former High Desert POINT route was discontinued and is now operated by Pacific Crest Bus Lines as an Amtrak Thruway service from Redmond to Klamath Falls.

== Routes ==
- Cascades Route (established July 2012), operating from Portland (Union Station) to the University of Oregon (Eugene) stopping at Tualatin, Woodburn, Salem, and Albany before stopping in Eugene
- Eastern Route (established February 2011), operating from Bend to Ontario with stops in Brothers, Riley, Burns, Buchanan, Drewsey, Juntura, Harper, and Vale before stopping at Ontario
- NorthWest Route (established March 2010): Portland (Union Station) to Astoria with stops at Beaverton, Hillsboro, North Plains, Elsie, Cannon Beach, Seaside, Gearhart, Warrenton before stopping at Astoria
- SouthWest Route (established April 2009): Klamath Falls to Medford and Cave Junction to Brookings, with service in between Medford and Cave Junction provided by Josephine Community Transit

== See also ==
- Intercity buses in the United States
