= Naval Air Station Glenview Museum =

- Location within Illinois
- Established: 2004
- Location: Glenview, Illinois
- Coordinates: 42.0917°N 87.8140°W
- Type: Aviation museum
- Founder: A. C. Realie
- Website: www.thehangarone.org

The Naval Air Station Glenview Museum is an aviation museum located in Glenview, Illinois focused on the history of Naval Air Station Glenview.

== History ==
=== Background ===
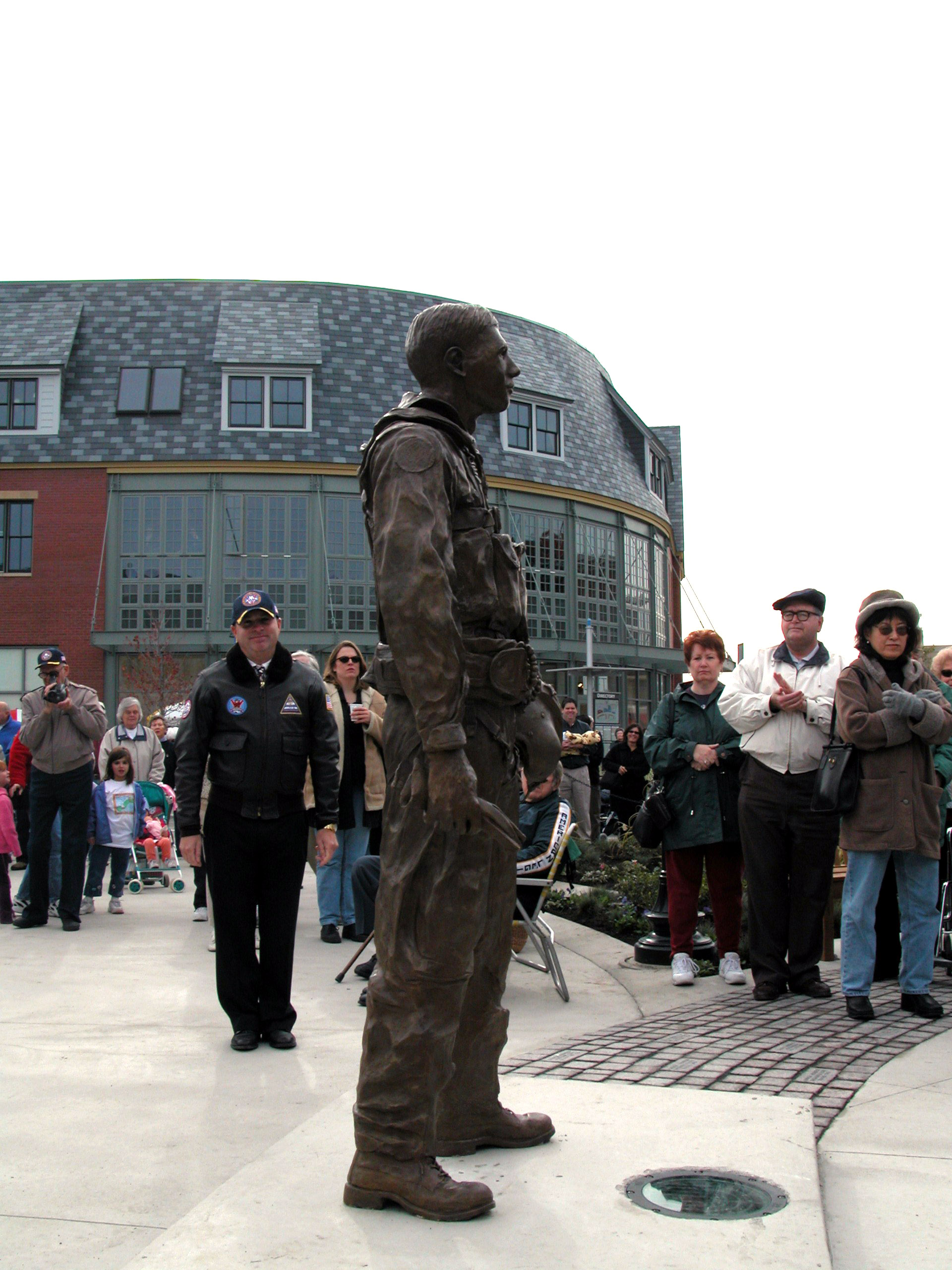
Statue of a naval airman sponsored by the museum

When NAS Glenview closed in 1995, plans were made to redevelop the former property into the Glen Town Center. The Glenview Hangar One Foundation was founded by A. C. Realie in 1996 to preserve the eponymous 180,000 sq ft (17,000 m^{2}) hangar and turn it into a museum. The foundation's efforts led to Hangar One and the former control tower being placed on the National Register of Historic Places in November 1998. However, two years later, the group argued that the hangar should be removed as its historic integrity had been significantly compromised. A large open area on the site of the former base was dedicated as Navy Park in October 2003.

=== Establishment ===
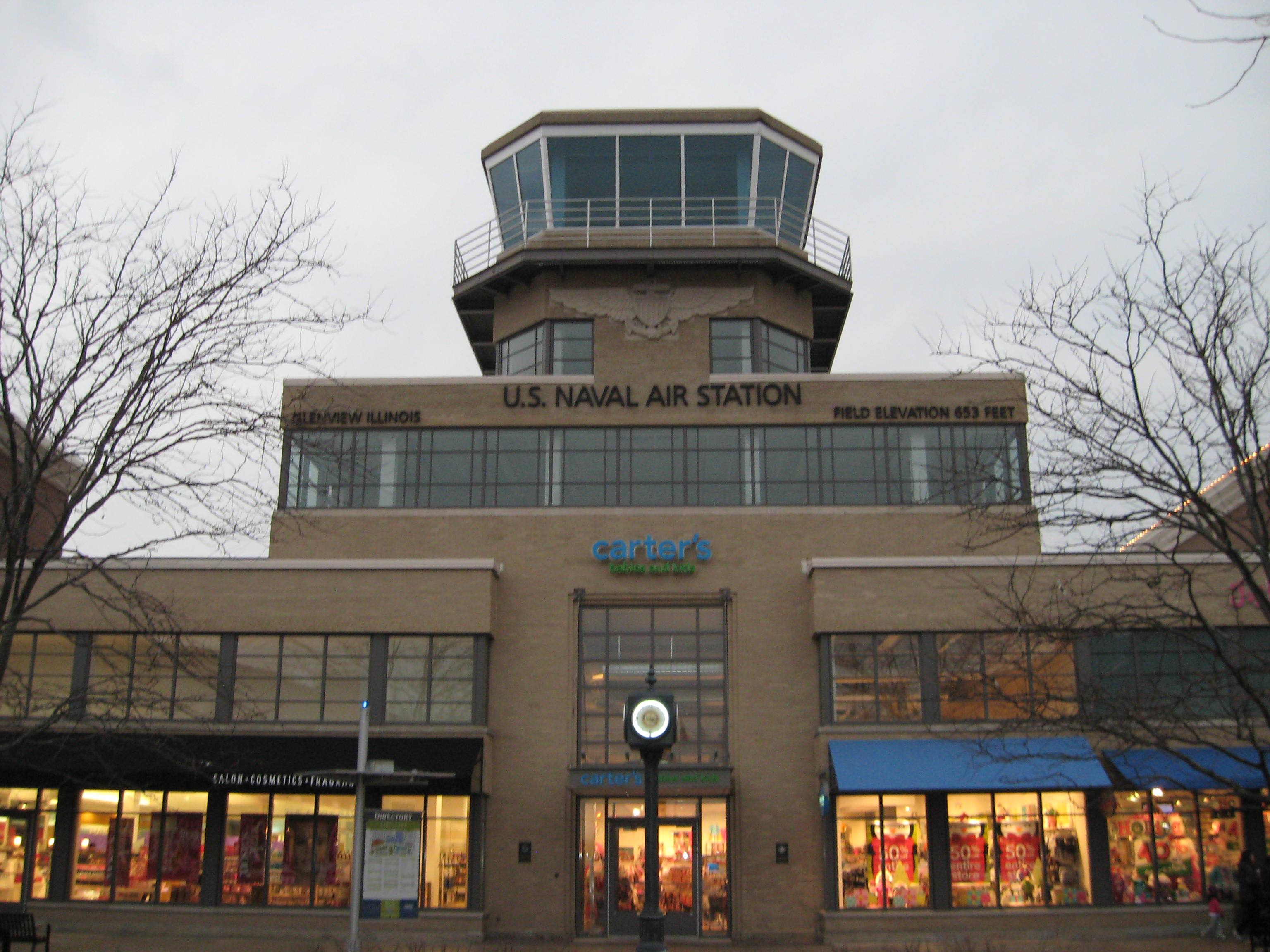
The former base control tower, previous home of the museum

The museum opened in a 2,800 sq ft (260 m^{2}) store in the former base control tower in June 2004. It was forced to close in March 2005 after the developer elected not to renew the one-year lease. The museum moved to a nearby 900 sq ft (84 m^{2}) space, where it reopened on 7 July 2006. In 2010, it began fundraising to build a 7,500 sq ft (700 m^{2}) to 10,000 sq ft (930 m^{2}) museum.

In December 2012, a General Motors FM-2 Wildcat, BuNo 57039, was recovered from Lake Michigan. The group partnered with another organization, Bring It Home, Glenview, to advocate that it should be placed in the museum. (Note: The Navy eventually decided that the aircraft would be placed on loan to the National Medal of Honor Museum in Arlington, Texas.)

A feasibility study was commissioned in June 2015 to evaluate the possibility of building a 16,000 sq ft (1,500 m^{2}) facility at one of three locations. To raise money for the new museum, the foundation produced a film about naval flight training in Lake Michigan during World War II that debuted in May 2016. The study was completed in August 2018. However, the Glenview Park Board rejected a proposal to build the museum in Gallery Park in October 2020.

The museum hired an archivist to inventory its collection in October 2024.

=== Closure announcement ===
The museum closed temporarily on 1 October 2025. It is in the process of transferring its collection to the Glenview History Center. The museum will close permanently in 2026.

== Exhibits ==
Exhibits at the museum include an R-2600 recovered from Lake Michigan, displays about George H. W. Bush and Butch O'Hare and a pew from the base chapel.

== Collection ==
- Sikorsky HH-52 Seaguard

== See also ==
- List of aviation museums
- National Museum of the American Sailor
