= Francesca Fontana =

Francesca Fontana is an American journalist and writer. Formerly a reporter for The Wall Street Journal, she is the author of The Family Snitch: A Daughter’s Memoir of Truth and Lies, an investigative memoir about her father's secret criminal past in Chicago, IL.

== Early life and education ==
Fontana lived on the Southwest side of Chicago until she was ten. Her mother, who later remarried, left her father when she was five. When Fontana was nine years old, her father was sent to prison. She moved to Oregon with her mother, stepfather, and brother when she was ten.

Fontana graduated from the University of Oregon in 2017. As a junior, she learned how to use the federal court records database and began researching her father's incarceration, intending to base her Clark Honors College thesis on her research.

== Career ==
A week after her graduation, Fontana moved to New York, where she interned for the Wall Street Journal. She was subsequently hired as a reporter, and later as a host for a Journal podcast. She was laid off in a round of editorial staff cuts in January 2026. Her last byline for the Journal was an excerpt from her memoir.

The Family Snitch was published by Steerforth Press in February 2026. It received positive reviews in publications including The New York Times.

== Bibliography ==
- The Family Snitch: A Daughter’s Memoir of Truth and Lies (2026, Steerforth: ISBN 978-1-58642-422-0)

== Recognition ==
In 2020, she received a Front Page Award for personal-service journalism by the Newswomen's Club of New York.
