= HML-776 =

Marine Light Helicopter Squadron 776
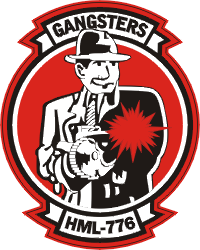
- HML-776 insignia
- Active: 1 April 1959 – 1 July 1994
- Country: United States
- Branch: USMC
- Type: UH-1N
- Part of: Inactive
- Nickname: Gangsters
- Tail Code: QL

Marine Light Helicopter Squadron 776 (HMM-776) was a reserve helicopter squadron of the United States Marine Corps. The squadron was based at Naval Air Station Glenview, Illinois, and fell under Marine Air Control Group 48 and the 4th Marine Aircraft Wing. HML-776 was deactivated on 1 July 1994.

== History ==
Marine Helicopter Transport Squadron 776 (HMR-776) was commissioned at Naval Air Station Glenview, Illinois, on 1 April 1959. They were the second helicopter squadron to form at NAS Glenview after HMR-763 was activated in April 1958. In April 1962, the squadron was redesignated Marine Medium Helicopter Squadron 776 (HMM-776). The redesignated HMM-763 was deactivated 30 September 1962 and its personnel reassigned to HMM-776. Another change in designation took place in 1972 when the squadron traded in its UH-34Ds for UH-1Es, and was again redesignated to its final name, HML-776. In January 1979 the squadron was reassigned to Marine Air Control Group 48.

In 1990, HML-776 was called to active duty in support of Operation Desert Storm and was deployed to Okinawa to fill a gap in forces left by the deployment of active duty forces to Southwest Asia. In 1991, while assigned to Marine Aircraft Group 36, HML-776 was sent to the Philippines to assist in relief operations following the eruption of Mount Pinatubo. The squadron returned to NAS Glenview in 1991 and returned to reserve status. In 1994, as part of the reorganization of the Marine Forces Reserve, HML-776 was deactivated. The squadron’s personnel and aircraft were transferred to Naval Air Station Joint Reserve Base Willow Grove, Pennsylvania, and formed HMLA-773, Detachment A.

== Unit awards ==
A unit citation or commendation is an award bestowed upon an organization for the action cited. Members of the unit who participated in said actions are allowed to wear on their uniforms the awarded unit citation. HML-776has been presented with the following awards:

Ribbon	Unit Award
	Joint Meritorious Unit Award
	Navy Unit Commendation
	Meritorious Unit Commendation
	National Defense Service Medal

== See also ==
- United States Marine Corps Aviation
- List of decommissioned United States Marine Corps aircraft squadrons
- List of active United States Marine Corps aircraft squadrons
