= Victor Pierpont Morris =

Victor P. Morris
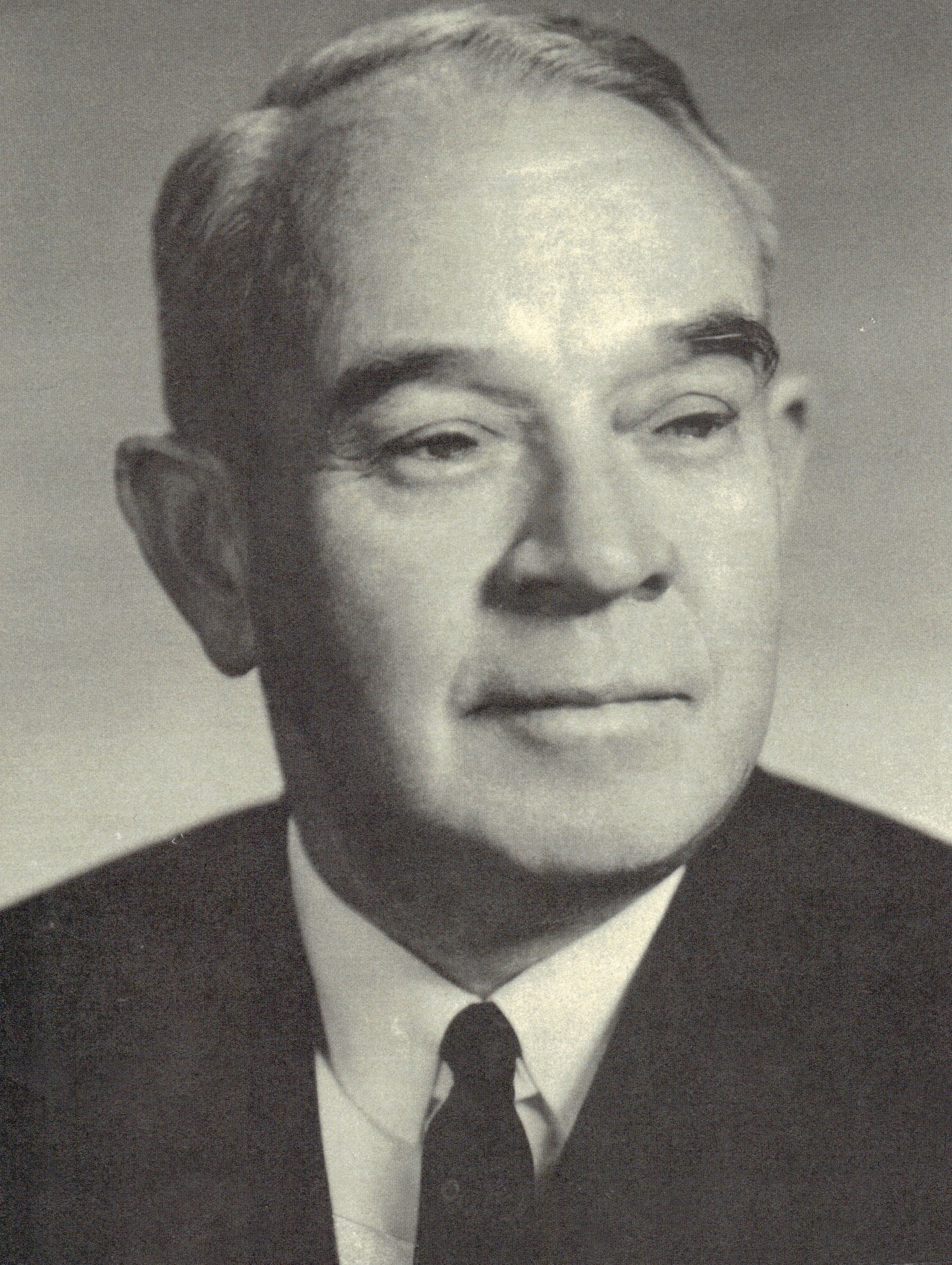
- University of Oregon -- professor, business school dean, and acting president; Northwest Christian College -- twice interim president, Eugene, Oregon
- Born: November 24, 1891; Sioux City, Iowa, USA
- Died: June 21, 1974 (aged 82); Eugene, Oregon, USA
- Education: University of Oregon (BA, MA); Columbia University (PhD)
- Occupations: Professor, Dean, President, Minister

Victor P. Morris was a highly respected University of Oregon (UO) professor (1926 to 1959), dean (1936 to 1957), and interim president (1953 to 1954). In addition, he served twice as acting president of Northwest Christian College (NCC) (1934 to 1936 and 1943 to 1944) as well as serving on the NCC Board of Trustees (1936 to 1961), over 20 years as chair. NCC is now known as Northwest Christian University.

== Early life ==
Morris was born in Sioux City, Iowa, on November 24, 1891, but moved to Oregon in 1905. His father, James M. Morris, was a regional minister in the Christian Church and a faculty member at Eugene Divinity School (precursor to Northwest Christian University) for several years. Morris was married to Grace Parker of Monmouth, Oregon; they celebrated their 49th wedding anniversary a week before he died.

== Academic background ==
His academic background included Bachelor of Arts (BA, 1915) and Master of Arts (MA, 1920) degrees from the University of Oregon and a Doctor of Philosophy (PhD, 1930) in economics from Columbia University in New York City. He authored a book titled Oregon’s Experience with Minimum Wage Legislation, which was published in 1930 by Columbia University Press in New York.

== University of Oregon ==
In his eulogy at Morris’ funeral, UO President Robert D. Clark said “Above all else he was a teacher.” Morris began teaching at the UO in 1926. Prior to that he taught in several Oregon high schools (1920 to 1922), at Grinnell College in Iowa (1922 to 1924), and at Oregon State College in Corvallis (1924 to 1926). At UO, he taught a course in economic principles, even when he was Dean of the College of Business. This course was remembered by many of his students as making economics understandable. After serving as Dean, the longest of any in the College's history, he returned to the classroom, holding the College's first endowed chair as the H.T. Miner Professor of Business, before retiring.

== Northwest Christian College ==
While serving on the NCC Board of Trustees, Morris twice stepped in to serve as Acting President, from 1934 to 1936 and again from 1943 to 1944. While he was on the board from 1934 to 1961 he served as Chair of the Board from 1934 to 1936 and again from 1942 to 1961. He oversaw the recovery of the college from its financial difficulties during the Great Depression. In addition, he shepherded the college through World War II. He worked with two of NCC's presidents: Kendall E. Burke (1936 to 1943) and Ross J. Griffeth (1944 to 1965). During his time at NCC, a new heating plant was installed in 1947, the Burke Hall dormitory was built in 1951, and the Library Building was constructed in 1957. Also during this time, ten buildings were removed or demolished. In addition, 12 properties were purchased.

== Other activities ==
His life was dedicated to service of others. He served two terms on the Eugene School District Board. After retiring he spent over a year in Korea with his wife as part of the UO University Advisory Team, sponsored by the US State Department. He served on the first Oregon State Education Commission and was a member of the Merit System Council for the State Public Welfare Commission, the Unemployment Compensation Commission, the State Board of Health, and also as chair of the Oregon state Committee on Postwar Readjustment and Development. For nearly 20 years, Morris had a radio program called “The World in Review” on Oregon Public Broadcasting.

== Ministerial work ==
Morris was an ordained minister in the Christian Church and an active member of the First Christian Church in Eugene, Oregon. He taught many Sunday school classes and officiated the weddings of many of his former students.

== Death ==
Morris died in Eugene, Oregon, on June 21, 1974.

== Awards and honors ==
NCC awarded Morris with an Honorary Doctor of Divinity degree in 1948. The Victor P. Morris Award, given annually to the most outstanding Adult Degree Program student in Business Administration at NCU, was instituted in 1995. Morris was named Eugene’s First Senior Citizen in 1966 at the age of 75 by the Eugene Chamber of Commerce.
