= Darren Berg =

American entrepreneur and convicted fraudster

Frederick Darren Berg (born Frederick Darren Muskopf; May 17, 1962) is an American entrepreneur, business executive, convicted Ponzi scheme operator, and prison escapee. He is the founder of MTR Western, a motorcoach operator headquartered in Seattle. He sold fraudulent investments through the Meridian Group, a group of investment companies, defrauding nearly 700 investors who lost almost $150 million, and he was sentenced to 18 years in prison in 2012. He has been nicknamed "Mini Madoff" for his crimes' similarity to those of Bernie Madoff. Berg escaped from prison in 2017.

== Early life ==
Berg was born with the name Frederick Darren Muskopf on May 17, 1962 in Ashland, Oregon, and grew up in Grants Pass, about an hour to the northwest. Darren's sister Wendy described their parents' relationship as abusive. "When he was a tiny boy, and my dad would be beating on my mother, he would crawl under the bed," said Wendy about Darren. Darren's grandfather drove for Greyhound Lines, a fact that Berg would frequently tell MTR Western drivers.

Berg's parents divorced in 1975. After his mother remarried, he changed his last name to match his stepfather's. He enrolled at the University of Oregon in Eugene where he joined and was elected treasurer of Oregon's Pi Kappa Alpha fraternity chapter. Berg later served as president and treasurer of the chapter simultaneously. The chapter accused Berg of embezzling as much as $21,000 of its funds to fund his charter bus company. Berg denied the allegations, left the fraternity, and dropped out of the university.

== Business ventures ==
Berg founded MTR Western in Seattle in 2003 with four Prevost H3-45 motorcoaches. In 2006, he announced a campaign to make MTR Western, which at that time had 300 workers and 167 buses in six cities, carbon neutral. In 2007, Berg identified himself as the general counsel of MTR Western in a hearing about an infraction for which the company had been cited, despite Berg not being a member of the Washington State Bar Association. Berg admitted at the hearing that he was not an attorney but insisted that he had graduated from law school. A Seattle Times reporter could find no record of Berg having obtained any university degree. Berg has falsely claimed to be a lawyer in other contexts as well.

Berg was known for being meticulously attentive to details at MTR Western. He interviewed his drivers personally, bought them uniforms from Nordstrom, and threw lavish holiday parties that one driver described as "legendary". Some of Berg's corporate employees described Berg as being prone to anger, throwing staplers, laptops, or coffee mugs at people who upset him. One employee, who spoke to Seattle Met on condition of anonymity, said that Berg would never admit wrongdoing after such outbursts.

In 2007, Berg founded GeoGenius, a company based in Seattle that produced travel-related audio and video content for GPS-enabled devices.

== Financial crimes ==
According to the Seattle Times in 2011, "Financial scandals have trailed Frederick Darren Berg across the Northwest for more than 25 years — each linked to his unusual lifelong fixation on tour buses." Berg’s first fraud conviction was for a check kiting scheme in 1987 while he was living in Portland, Oregon. Berg was convicted of bank fraud for stealing approximately $30,000 and was sentenced to probation. After leaving Portland for Seattle in 1989, the Seattle Post-Intelligencer reported that Berg "started swindling investors in 2001" with an investment firm known as Meridian Group which collapsed into bankruptcy in 2010. The firm perpetrated the largest Ponzi scheme in Washington state history.

Berg told investors in Meridian Group that he would buy mortgage loans and collect loan payments from borrowers. To deceive his investors, Berg opened dozens of post office boxes under fake names, wrote fake loan documents, and submitted this misleading information to his auditor, Moss Adams. The FBI arrested Berg in Los Angeles on October 21, 2010, on a criminal complaint charging him with wire fraud, money laundering, and bankruptcy fraud. On December 1, 2010, Berg was labeled as a potential flight risk and was denied bail. MTR Western was sold by a bankruptcy trustee. From the Ponzi scheme, Berg diverted as much as $85 million of investor money for his personal use, including $45 million channeled into MTR Western.

On August 2, 2011, Berg pleaded guilty to one count each of wire fraud, money laundering, and bankruptcy fraud. In February 2012, Berg was sentenced to 18 years in prison. He was assigned to serve his sentence at the United States Penitentiary, Atwater (USP Atwater) in California.

== Prison break ==
In December 2017, Berg was discovered missing after having walked away from the minimum security area at USP Atwater. Mark Calvert, who served as the bankruptcy trustee for Berg's Meridian investment groups, likened Berg's escape to the film The Shawshank Redemption, although without needing to create an escape tunnel. "The only difference is Berg just walked away," said Calvert, who criticized the choice to house Berg in a minimum-security facility.

In 2019, the Associated Press reported that the U.S. Marshals Service has named Berg's boyfriend, flight attendant Darrell Ray Blankenship, as a person of interest in Berg's prison escape case. Blankenship posted photos online, possibly including Berg, in Rio de Janeiro in early 2018, a few weeks after his escape. Blankenship sent a message to Berg's mother with a note reading, "hello from Rio".
