= Martenne Bettendorf =

American volleyball player

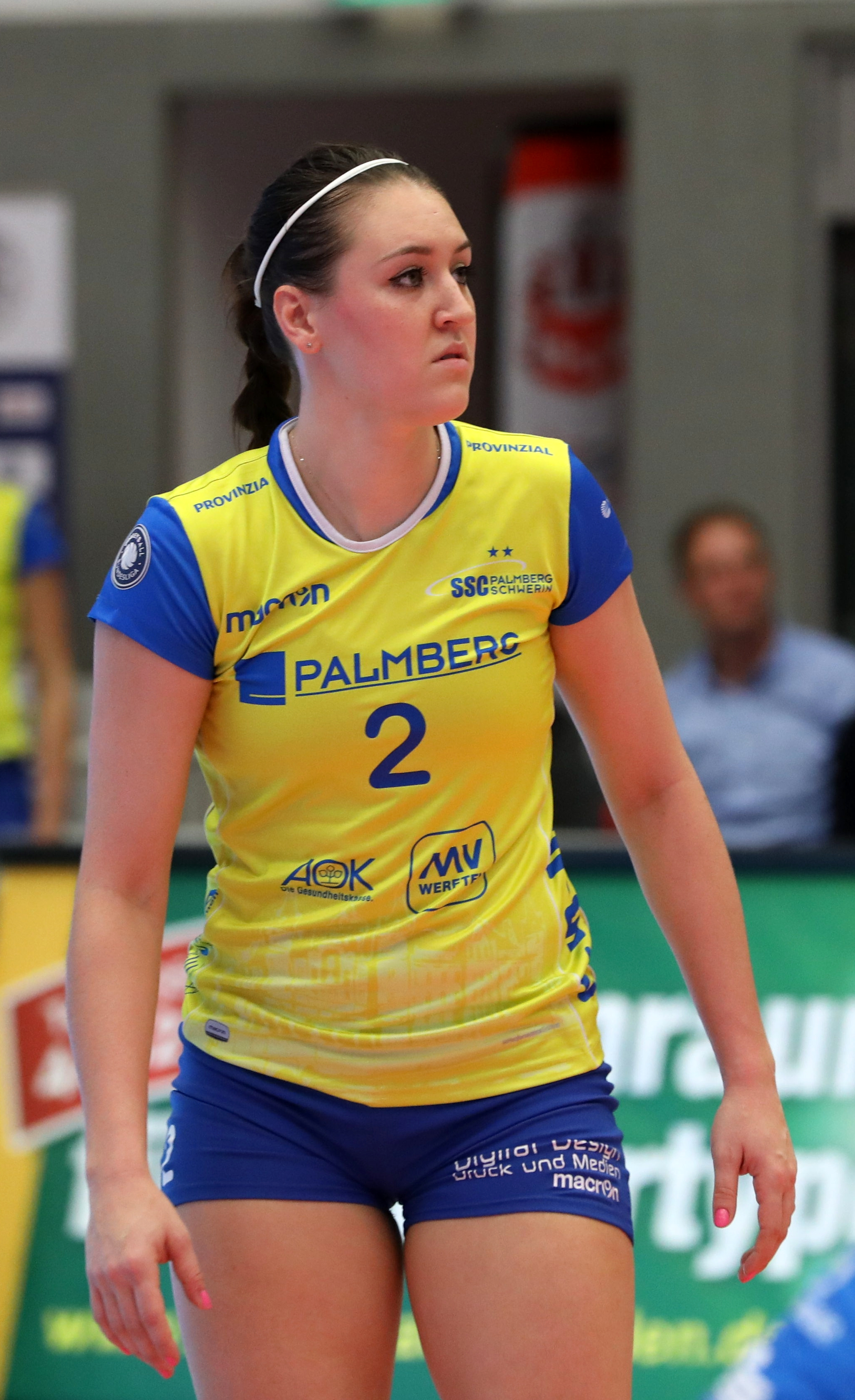

Personal information
- Nationality: American
- Born: April 1, 1994 (age 32) (United States) Portland, Oregon
- Height: 1.86 m (6 ft 1 in)
- Weight: 75 kg (165 lb)

Martenne Julia Bettendorf (born April 1, 1994, in Portland, Oregon) is an American volleyball player.

== Career ==
Bettendorf started playing volleyball at Portland Central Catholic High School. During her studies at the University of Oregon, she played for the University of Oregon Ducks team. In 2014, she was nominated as an All American player. Following that, Bettendorf made the jump to a professional volleyball player and received a contract with Azerrail Baku in Azerbaijan. With Baku she finished second in the national championship. She joined the international club in 2016/17 in the Champions League but missed as the worst runner-up the entry into the play-offs. For the 2017/18 season, she became the successor of her compatriot Ariel Gebhardt, a German champion SSC Palmberg Schwerin. For the 2018/19 season, she played in Neuchatel Switzerland where she helped lead her team to a league championship, CEV cup second runner up, and Swiss cup champions. For the 2019/20 season, she was in Nancy, France where she assisted in the teams first run to the post season playoffs. Season was cut short due to COVID.
