= Ann E. Elsner =

American researcher

Ann E. Elsner is an American researcher and Distinguished Professor of Optometry, Indiana University Bloomington.

She earned a B.A. degree from Indiana University Bloomington, and an M.A. and Ph.D. from the University of Oregon. In 1987, she joined the Schepens Eye Research Institute as a researcher. In 2005, she moved to Indiana University Bloomington and became a professor in the School of Optometry and director of the Borish Center for Ophthalmic Research. In the same year, she founded and became CEO of Aeon Imaging, a bioimaging technology firm.

In 2018, she received the Edwin H. Land Medal from Optica. In 2020, she received the Bicentennial Medal. In 2022, she received the Charles F. Prentice Medal Award from the American Academy of Optometry.

She is a Fellow of Optica, the Association for Research in Vision and Ophthalmology, and the American Academy of Optometry.
