= Gordon Arthur Stanley =

American naval aviator and fighter ace

- Born: July 13, 1921; Seattle, Washington, U.S.
- Died: April 19, 1956 (aged 34) near Fort Sheridan, Illinois, U.S.
- Military career
- Allegiance: United States
- Branch: United States Navy
- Service years: 1943–1956
- Rank: Lieutenant Commander
- Conflicts: World War II
- Awards: Silver Star; Distinguished Flying Cross (4)

Gordon Arthur Stanley (July 13, 1921 – April 19, 1956) was a United States Navy aviator and a flying ace of World War II. He was credited with shooting down eight enemy aircraft in the Pacific Theatre flying Grumman F6F Hellcats. As a United States Naval Reserve officer, he was killed in an accident while flying a Grumman F9F-6 Cougar of Naval Aviation Reserve Training Unit, Naval Air Station Glenview, in Illinois.

== Early life ==
Gordon Arthur Stanley was born on July 13, 1921, in Seattle, Washington, but his home of record was Oakridge, Oregon, the son of Mr. and Mrs. Fred B. Stanley of that town. Stanley attended the University of Oregon, where he was a member of Kappa Sigma fraternity. The Register-Guard, Eugene, Oregon, reported on Sunday, August 29, 1943, that Stanley had been commissioned an ensign in the Naval Reserve following completion of training at the Naval Air Training Center, Corpus Christi, Texas.

== Naval career ==
=== World War II ===
Stanley served as a U.S. Navy fighter pilot who flew with squadrons VF-3 and VF-27, the latter flying from USS Princeton. He is credited with eight victories while assigned to the latter squadron. On June 19, 1944, during the Great Marianas Turkey Shoot, Stanley was credited with downing four Japanese aircraft while flying an F6F-3 Hellcat. Following the war, he joined the U.S. Naval Reserve.

=== Death ===
In 1956, while assigned to the staff of the Chief of Naval Air Reserve Training at Naval Air Station Glenview, Illinois, north of Chicago, at age 34, on April 19, 1956, he embarked on a routine training mission in a flight of two Grumman F9F-6 Cougars. "Officials at Glenview said the plane was one of two on a training flight. The flyer who returned reported that a few seconds after the planes went into clouds at 19,000 feet, Stanley reported by radio that he was 'losing control'. Glenview sent out a helicopter and flying boat PBY air-sea rescue unit, and within a few minutes both reported seeing the lost plane in shallow water half a mile off Fort Sheridan. Neither saw any trace of the pilot." Navy officials said that the accident occurred at 1330 hrs. and that they were notified by phone from Fort Sheridan within five minutes. The rescue units were airborne at 1340 hrs. The pilot ejected but his chute apparently failed to deploy. The plane fell into shallow water about a half mile off of the fort and the canopy from the aircraft was recovered by personnel at the fort but there was no sign of Lt. Cmdr. Stanley. He was survived by his wife and three children in Arlington Heights, Illinois.

== Awards ==
Stanley was the recipient of the Silver Star and the Distinguished Flying Cross.
