= Neil Snider =

Canadian educator

R. Neil Snider was a Canadian educator. He served as the president of Trinity Western University (TWU) in Langley, British Columbia from 1974 until his retirement in 2006 and as president emeritus since that time. He was the longest-serving Canadian university president when he retired. He died in December 2025.

== Education ==
Snider earned an education degree from the University of Manitoba and a Ph.D. from the University of Oregon. He was also an ordained minister in the Evangelical Free Church of Canada.

== Career ==
Before coming to TWU, Snider served as chair of general studies, dean, and academic dean at Providence College. He was appointed president of TWU in 1974. Snider led TWU from its original status as a 350-student junior college to its current position as a 3,500-student Christian liberal-arts university, granting degrees in more than 50 areas of study. The school was recognized as a four-year college by the government of British Columbia in 1979 and accepted into membership by the Association of Universities and Colleges of Canada (AUCC) in 1984.

Snider retired in June 2006.

Snider was a member of the AUCC and the Council of Western Canadian University Presidents, as well as a board member of several charitable organizations. He lived in Abbotsford, British Columbia, Canada.

== Recognition ==
In 2002 Snider was presented with the Queen Elizabeth II Golden Jubilee Medal for the Golden Jubilee of Her Majesty Queen Elizabeth II.
