= Steve Cunningham (computer scientist) =

American computer scientist (1942–2015)

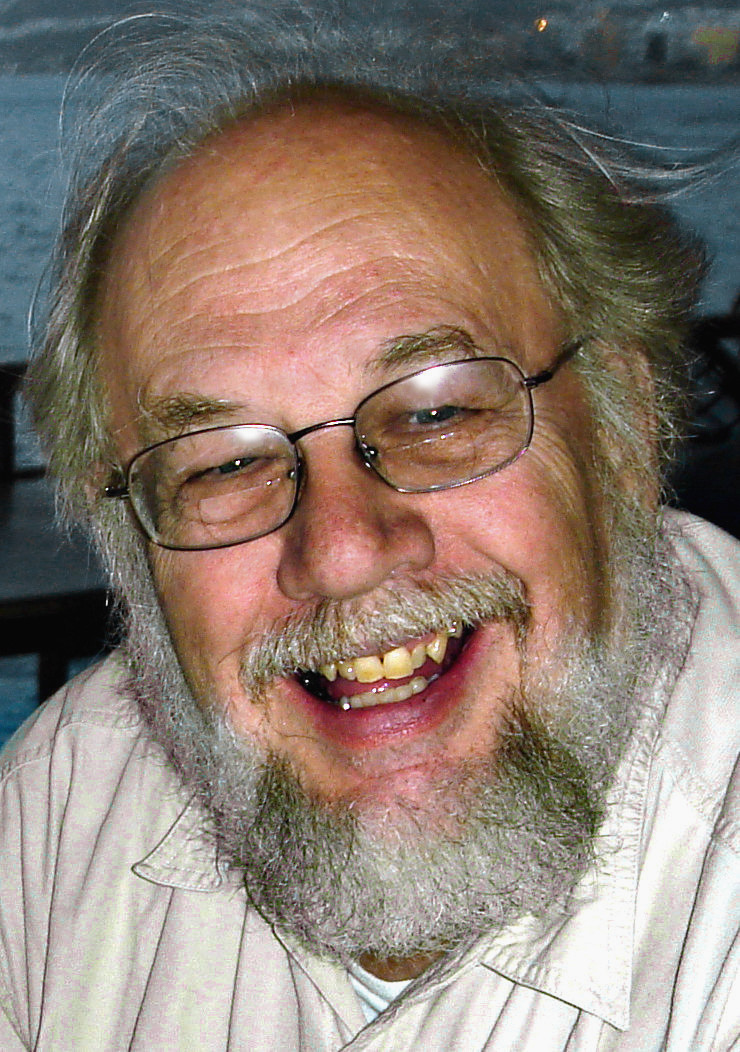
Steve Cunningham 2008

Robert Stephen Cunningham (1942 – March 27, 2015) was an American computer scientist who was Professor Emeritus of Computer Science at California State University Stanislaus.

== Biography ==
Steve Cunningham received his BA cum laude in Mathematics from Drury University in 1964. He continued his studies at the University of Oregon where he earned his M.A. in Mathematics in 1966 and his Ph.D. in Mathematics three years later. In 1982, he received an M.S. in Computer Science at Oregon State University.

Cunningham started working at the University of Kansas as Assistant Professor of Mathematics from 1969 to 1974. From 1974 he worked at the Birmingham–Southern College as Assistant Professor of Mathematics for a year, Associate Professor of Mathematics for four years and as Associate Professor of Computer Science from 1979 to 1982. Since 1982 he has worked at the California State University Stanislaus, since 1986 as Professor of Computer Science until 2001, Gemperle Distinguished Professor for three years and Stanislaus Professor Emeritus since 2005. From 1999 to 2000 Cunningham was also visiting scientist at the San Diego Supercomputer Center. He was National Science Foundation Program Director, EHR/DUE from 2003 to 2005. Research Professor of Computer Science at the Oregon State University 2004-05 and Noyce Visiting Professor of Computer Science at Grinnell College in 2006.

Cunningham received several awards and honors. A Fellow of the European Association for Computer Graphics in 1998, the Outstanding Professor for Research, Scholarship, and Creative Activity, CSU Stanislaus in 2001, the Gemperle Distinguished Professor, CSU Stanislaus in 2001, the ACM SIGGRAPH Outstanding Contribution Award in 2004 and the Noyce Visiting Professor of Computer Science, Grinnell College in 2006.

Cunningham died on March 27, 2015.

== Work ==
Cunningham's research interests were in Computer graphics, especially computer graphics education, Computer Science Education, and computer visualization in learning mathematics.

== See also ==
- Educational visualization

== Publications ==
- 1989. Programming the User Interface: Principles and Examples. With Judith R. Brown. Wiley.
- 1991. Visualization in Teaching and Learning Mathematics. Edited with Walter Zimmermann. MAA Notes Number 19, Mathematical Association of America.
- 1992. Computer Graphics Using Object-Oriented Programming. Edited with N. Craighill, M. Fong and J. Brown. Wiley,
- 1992. Interactive Learning Through Visualization - The Impact of Computer Graphics in Education. Edited with Roger Hubbold. Springer-Verlag.
- 1996. Electronic Publishing on CD-ROM. With Judson Rosebush. O'Reilly and Associates.
- 2007. Computer Graphics: Programming in OpenGL for Visual Communication. Prentice-Hall.
- 2009. Graphics Shaders: Theory and Practice. With Mike Bailey. AK Peters. 2012. Second edition.
