= Naval Air Station Glenview =

US military base in Illinois (1923–1995)

- Glenview, Illinois in the United States
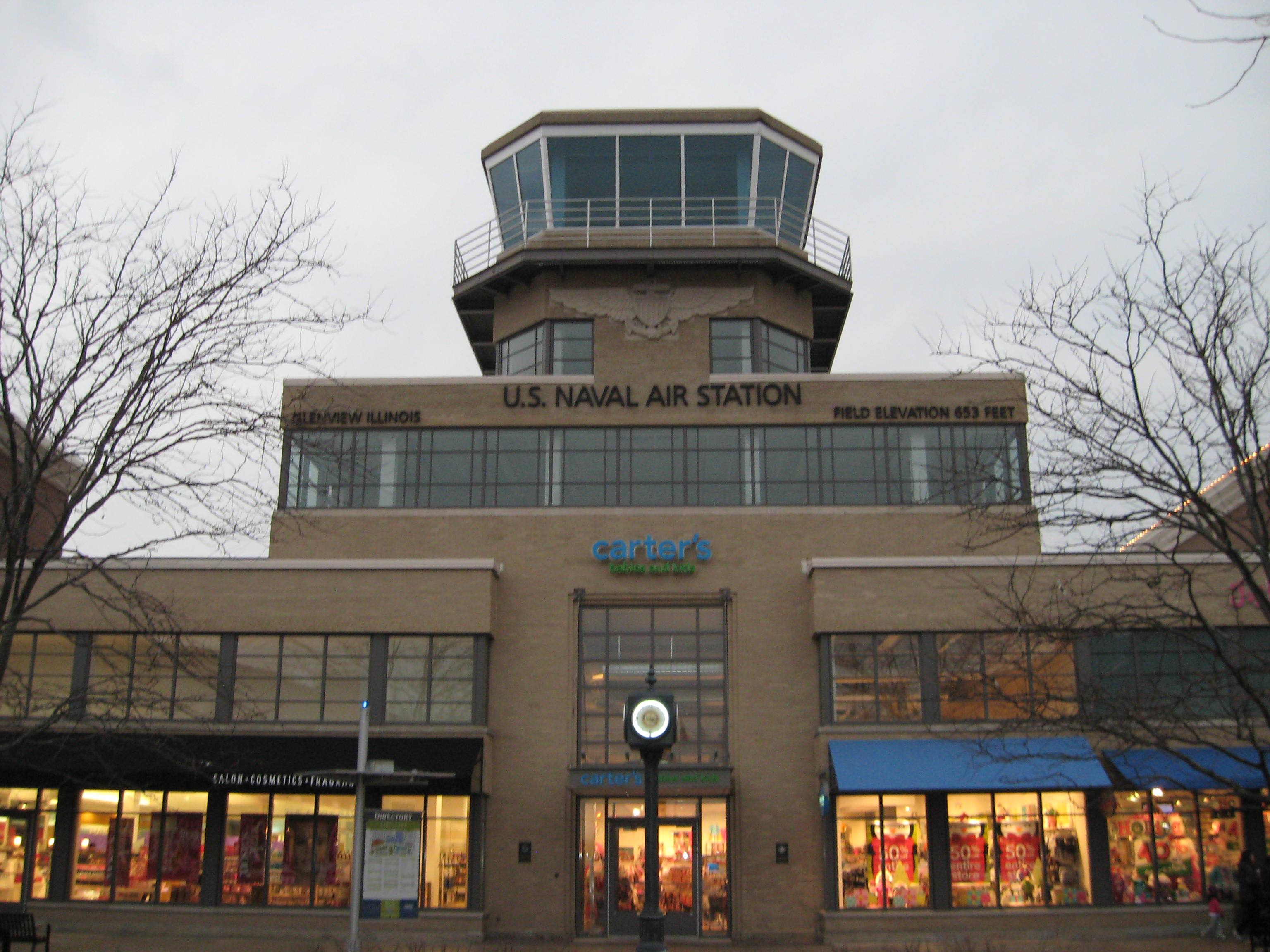
- The former air traffic control tower at NAS Glenview during 2010, now listed in the National Register of Historic Places

Site information
- Type: Naval Air Station
- Owner: Department of Defense
- Operator: US Navy
- Condition: Closed

Location
- Location in the United States
- Coordinates: 42°05′26″N 87°49′21″W

Site history
- Built: 1923; Dedicated 1929 (as Curtiss Field)
- Built by: Curtiss Flying Service
- In use: 1937–1995
- Fate: Redeveloped as a mixed-use development known as 'The Glen'
- Events: Chicago Air & Water Show

Airfield information
- Identifiers: IATA: NBU, ICAO: KNBU, WMO: 725306
- Elevation: 199 metres (653 ft) AMSL
Runways
Direction	Length and surface
17/35	2,438 metres (7,999 ft) Paved

U.S. National Register of Historic Places
- Official name: Hangar 1, Naval Air Station—Glenview
- Designated: 12 November 1998
- Reference no.: 98001357
- Area of significance: Military

Naval Air Station Glenview or NAS Glenview was an operational U.S. Naval Air Station from 1937 to 1995. Located in Glenview, Illinois, a suburb of Chicago, the air base primarily operated training aircraft as well as seaplanes on nearby Lake Michigan during World War II. Reconfigured as a Naval Air Reserve base following World War II, NAS Glenview supported Naval Air Reserve, Marine Air Reserve/4th Marine Aircraft Wing, and U.S. Army Reserve 244th Aviation Group as well as an active duty Coast Guard Air Station.

== History ==
=== Pre-military history ===
The base was originally built by the Curtiss Flying Service and intended to be the hub of Chicago's air service. When the field was dedicated as Curtiss Field on 20 October 1929, it was home to the largest hangar built to that time, Hangar One. Hangar One, one of the most advanced hangars at the time, included many innovations which were considered state-of-the-art in its time. A one gigacandela electric light was erected which allowed for airfield activity in the dark. A system of carefully designed sliding doors created dividers for storage and zone heating. Glassed-in galleries allowed passengers the opportunity to watch the mechanics at work on the ground floor. A passenger-friendly restaurant and lounge were opened in the upper levels. A loudspeaker system informed the passengers of the flight arrivals and departures. The final cost for the airfield and Hangar One was $3 million in 1930. By adjusting the price for inflation, the relative cost in 2017 would equate to about $44.8 million. It was widely believed to be one of the Midwest's finest airports.

In 1930, the National Air Races took place at Curtiss-Reynolds Airport/Curtiss Field and in 1933 the International Air Races took place there in conjunction with the Century of Progress. Such aviation luminaries as Charles Lindbergh, Wiley Post, Jimmy Doolittle and Art Chester attended. In 1934, Post tried to set an aviation altitude record from Curtiss. By 1938, civilian and military operations both operated from the field, but in 1940 it was sold to the United States Navy.

=== Military presence ===
==== U.S. Navy ====
Reduced military budgets between World War I and World War II forced the War Department and the Navy Department to place increased emphasis on Reserve and National Guard manpower, with many of the facilities for the personnel of these organizations located in major metropolitan areas, given their status as centers of civilian employment. One course pursued by the U.S. Navy was to establish a series of Naval Reserve Air Bases (NRABs), the third one of which was established near Chicago adjacent to the then-Naval Training Station Great Lakes. Reservists initially flew and maintained seaplanes from shore facilities on Lake Michigan and a small field at Naval Training Station Great Lakes. These facilities eventually became inadequate for newer and larger aircraft entering the Fleet in the 1930s, and it was recommended that the NRAB be relocated to Curtiss-Reynolds Airport/Curtiss Field. This recommendation was approved and military construction at Curtiss Field began on 4 January 1937, followed by an official dedication as NRAB Chicago on 28 August 1937.

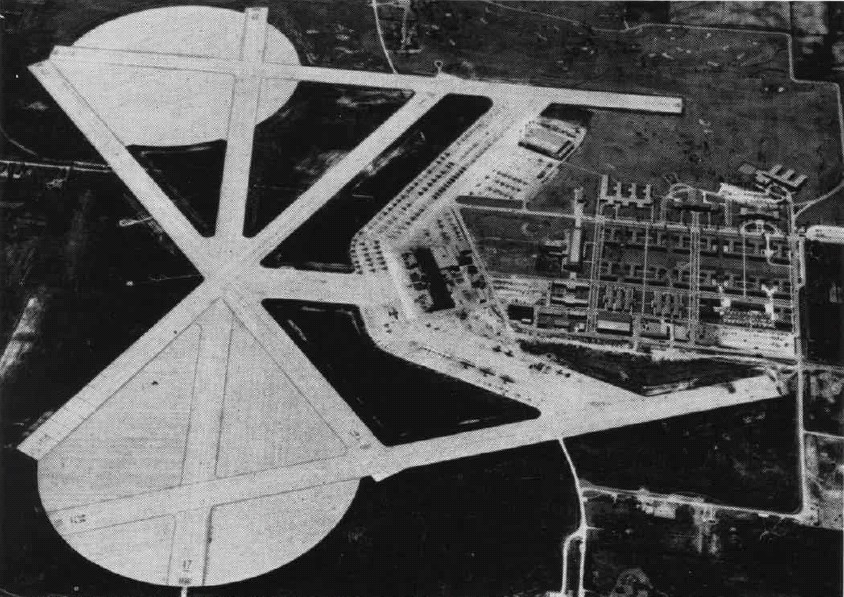
Aerial view of NAS Glenview in the late 1940s

For the next three years, the air station's primary role was elimination training for students seeking appointments as Naval Aviation Cadets (NAVCADs). Those students meeting the required standards were later transferred to NAS Pensacola, Florida for further flight training. By 1941, with the United States' entry into World War II appearing imminent, it was apparent to the naval leadership in Washington DC that the primary flight training facilities concentrated at and around NAS Pensacola would not be able to accommodate the needed expansion in Naval Aviation. As a result, naval planners opted to transfer primary flight training to multiple Naval Reserve Air Bases around the country and use NAS Pensacola for advanced training. NRAB Chicago was selected to be the first base in this program as a proof of concept. A subsequent construction program of 121 work days resulted in 1,300,000 square feet (120,000 m^{2}) of new concrete being poured for runways, taxiways and ramps, while new hangars and other administrative and support buildings were also constructed and completed by late November 1942. On 1 January 1943, NRAB Chicago was redesignated as NAS Chicago. By 1944, "Chicago" was deleted from the air station's title and the installation renamed NAS Glenview.

Nearly 9,000 aviation cadets for the U.S. Navy, U.S. Marine Corps and U.S. Coast Guard received their primary flight training at NAS Glenview during World War II, which represented over 800,000 flight hours and over 2 million takeoffs and landings. Later during the war, NAS Glenview also hosted advanced training in Fleet combat aircraft, primarily for carrier qualification in Lake Michigan aboard the Chicago-homeported training aircraft carriers USS Sable (IX-81) and USS Wolverine (IX-64) of the 9th Naval District Carrier Qualification Training Unit (CQTU).

Following the end of World War II, NAS Glenview discontinued its role as a primary training base and became headquarters for the newly formed Naval Air Reserve Training Command (NAVAIRESTRACOM) in 1946. NAVAIRESTRACOM's primary responsibility was the oversight of numerous reserve naval air stations throughout the US where experienced Naval Aviators, enlisted Naval Aircrewmen, and maintenance personnel from World War II could affiliate as Naval Reservists and maintain their aviation proficiency should their skills be needed for future conflicts. These skills were readily proven when squadrons and personnel were mobilized and recalled back to active duty during the Korean War and the Berlin Crisis. Each base also had an assigned Naval Air Reserve Training Unit (NARTU), which until a reorganization of the Naval Air Reserve in 1970, actually "owned" all assigned aircraft. One of the better units based at NAS Glenview in the post-World War II period was Attack Squadron 725 (VA-725), part of NARTU Glenview until 1970, when it was redesignated as Attack Squadron 209 (VA-209) and became part of Carrier Air Wing Reserve TWENTY (CVWR-20) from 1970 to 1972. Initially flying the A-4B Skyhawk, the squadron later transitioned to the A-4L Skyhawk. From 1967 to 1972, part of VA-725-cum-VA-209 also operated as the Air Barons, a Naval Air Reserve precision flight demonstration team that augmented the U.S. Navy Flight Demonstration Squadron, the Blue Angels, and the U.S. Air Force's demonstration squadron, the Thunderbirds, at air show locations other than those where the Blue Angels or Thunderbirds were performing on a given weekend during the air show season. Both VA-209 and the Air Barons were disestablished in 1972.

During the latter half of the Cold War from 1970 until 1990, and continuing on from the post-Cold War period until 1995, NAS Glenview was primarily the home of two Naval Air Reserve patrol squadrons, Patrol Squadron SIXTY (VP-60) and Patrol Squadron NINETY (VP-90). Initially equipped with the P-2 Neptune, both later transitioned to the P-3A Orion, followed by another transition the P-3B Orion maritime patrol and reconnaissance aircraft. These aircraft were home based at NAS Glenview and crewed by a combination of full-time active duty Training and Administration of the Reserve (TAR) personnel and part-time Selected Naval Reservists (SELRES). Training activities were conducted from NAS Glenview and the patrol squadrons routinely deployed overseas for anti-submarine warfare operations against Soviet submarines and surface ships in the Atlantic and Mediterranean or for other operations in the Caribbean.

Another Naval Air Reserve squadron at NAS Glenview was Fleet Logistics Support Squadron FIFTY-ONE (VR-51), operating the C-118 aircraft and later C-9B Skytrain II aircraft, providing operational support airlift and transport of military personnel and cargo worldwide. VR-51's noteworthy service included support of US military operations in Lebanon and Grenada during the 1980s and between the US and multiple bases in Southwest Asia during Operations DESERT SHIELD / DESERT STORM in the 1990s.

Through the mid-1990s, NAS Glenview was also home to twenty-seven Naval Air Reserve reinforcing/sustaining augmentation units, to include two patrol squadron augmentation units containing additional P-3 flight crews in an active flying status that also routinely flew VP-60 and VP-90 aircraft, as well as oversight of Naval Air Reserve training programs and associated reinforcing/sustaining units at Naval Air Reserve Center (formerly Naval Air Station) Twin Cities, Minnesota, the latter facility now part of Minneapolis-Saint Paul Joint Air Reserve Station.

Before its closure due to a 1993 Base Realignment and Closure Commission decision, the base was also used as a staging area and departure point for aircraft participating in the annual Chicago Air & Water Show. Following the 1993 BRAC decision, VP-60 and VP-90 were also slated for disestablishment and their respective P-3B aircraft either distributed to other Reserve patrol squadrons, identified for transfer to NATO and Allied military forces under the Foreign Military Sales (FMS) program, or retired and mothballed. VR-51 was also disestablished concurrent with VP-60 and VP-90, with its C-9B aircraft similarly distributed to other VR squadrons or mothballed. In November 1997 a new squadron using the designation VR-51 was established as a Naval Air Reserve squadron at MCAS Kaneohe Bay, Hawaii, where it currently operates C-20G Gulfstream IV aircraft. The majority of NAS Glenview's Naval Reserve reinforcing/sustaining units were also disestablished, with their reserve personnel either retiring from the Navy or transferring to other Regular Navy or Naval Reserve commands/units at other bases.

==== U.S. Marine Corps ====
The air station was also home to Marine Corps aircraft. In 1959, the Marine Corps Reserve established the Marine Helicopter Transportation Squadron 776 (HMR-776) at NAS Glenview with HUP-2 helicopters. The squadron was redesignated as Marine Medium Helicopter Squadron 776 (HMM-776) in 1962 and changed aircraft to the CH-34D. In 1972, the squadron was redesignated for the last time to Marine Light Helicopter Squadron 776 (HML-776) and changed aircraft to the UH-1E which was eventually upgraded to the UH-1N. This unit was deployed in 1991 in support of Operation Desert Storm and returned to NAS Glenview 10 months later. HML-776 was deactivated in 1994. NAS Glenview was also home to the 4th Marine Aircraft Wing's Marine Aerial Refueler Transport Squadron 234 (VMGR-234 and its KC-130F and KC-130T Hercules aircraft until 1994, when the squadron was permanently relocated to NAS JRB Fort Worth, Texas as part of the BRAC-mandated closure of NAS Glenview. The Marine Air Reserve Training Command (MARTC) was established on 25 February 1946, at NAS Glenview, Illinois, to maintain the combat readiness of Marine Corps Reserve aviation personnel post-World War II. It played a critical role in training reservists during the Korean and Vietnam wars before being inactivated in the late 1990s. Marine Attack Squadron-543 was a MARTC squadron based at NAS Glenview, flying the A-4 Skyhawk, models: A-4A, B, C and L aircraft. The squadron emblem was a bulldog riding a bomb over a target.

==== U.S. Army ====
The Fort Sheridan, IL Flight Detachment (FSFD) relocated its C-12, U-21 and UH-1 aircraft from Fort Sheridan's Haley Army Airfield near Highwood, IL to NAS Glenview in 1978. Operating from NAS Glenview's Hangar 1, the active duty Army Flight Detachment provided U.S wide executive transport flight operations to U.S. Army Recruiting Command, Military Enlistment Processing Command, Fourth U.S. Army, USARMR V and U.S. Army Corps of Engineers – Chicago District which were all headquartered at Fort Sheridan.

The Fort Sheridan Flight Detachment operated until the closure of Fort Sheridan, IL in 1991.

==== U.S. Coast Guard ====
Coast Guard Air Station Chicago was commissioned as a tenant activity on the northwest corner of NAS Glenview in March 1969 and equipped with HH-52 Seaguard helicopters. Primarily a search and rescue (SAR) activity for the Great Lakes, Air Station Chicago was the primary U.S. Coast Guard aerial SAR unit for southern Lake Michigan, responsible for the waters from Milwaukee, Wisconsin to Muskegon, Michigan and south to Gary, Indiana.

In April 1995, Coast Guard Air Station Traverse City gained operational responsibility for what was CGAS Chicago. Renamed Coast Guard Air Facility Glenview, the station remained on the base during NAS Glenview's BRAC closure process and consisted of a multipurpose hangar, office facility and public works building. Air Facility Glenview staged one of Air Station Traverse City's HH-65A Dolphin helicopters with two full crews during the busy search and rescue season from April through mid-November. However, CGAF Glenview subsequently ceased operations on 15 November 1996 and its operations eventually relocated to the current Coast Guard Air Facility Waukegan, Illinois.

=== 1993 Base Realignment and Closure (BRAC) Commission Decision ===
Towards the end and following the end of the Cold War, BRAC Commissions were established to shed what the Department of Defense and the U.S. Congress considered to be excess military units and infrastructure. The 1993 BRAC identified NAS Glenview for closure no later than 30 September 1995, along with corresponding inactivation or transfer of its assigned squadrons and other units.

=== Post-BRAC ===
On 29 June 1998, the Navy transferred the last segment of the closed Naval Air Station Glenview (BRAC 1993) from Navy ownership to private ownership, with the Village of Glenview, Illinois and the Local Reuse Authority (LRA) taking possession of over 90% of the closed and transferring portion of the base. The first transfer occurred in September 1997, with the remaining 10% transferred in October 1999. This last 10% contained the remaining sites that required some form of remedial environmental action. The 90% milestone was because the operational closure of the base occurred in September 1995, just two years after the base was selected for closure during BRAC 1993 (aka "BRAC III"). Since then, much of the base property had been idle. The new use plan for the base was different from the previous airfield use, with much of the land and facilities seeing extensive demolition and redevelopment. The importance of the redevelopment effort was significant. NAS Glenview was located in the geographic center of the Village of Glenview and contained 15% of the landmass. Once redevelopment planners decided not to use the existing infrastructure as an airfield, alternate plans were developed. The resulting plan called for a "mixed use" scenario providing open space and public land, senior and residential housing, recreational and sports areas, mixed retail areas, a business park with an area used as a "prairie reserve", and a new railroad station. Since the existing air base infrastructure had to be demolished to make room for a new supporting infrastructure, it was important for the LRA to develop the base in systematic stages.

Removed were 1 million cubic yards of concrete, 1.5 miles of runways and 108 former Department of Defense buildings. In their place is The Glen, a 1,121 acre mixed-use district, with new homes, offices, and retail space, although the control tower and Hangar 1 have been preserved as a historic building. Hangar 1, including the control tower, was added to the National Register of Historic Places in 1998 as building #98001357. However, according to the Glenview Hangar One Foundation, 85% of Hangar One was dismantled even following efforts by the foundation and the U.S. Navy to preserve historical buildings.

The Naval Air Station Glenview Museum was established in 2004.

== Alumni ==
- Astronaut Neil Armstrong served as a Naval Aviator and Naval Reservist at NAS Glenview.
- Former President George H. W. Bush received carrier pilot training as a Student Naval Aviator at NAS Glenview during World War II, in August 1943.
- Former President Gerald Ford served at NAS Glenview from the end of April 1945 to January 1946, during World War II, as the Staff Physical and Military Training Officer.
- Jesse L. Brown reported to Glenview Naval Air Station on 15 March 1947, for Naval Aviator training. He was the first African-American aviator to complete the United States Navy's basic flight training program, for pilots. A recipient of the Distinguished Flying Cross; and the first African-American naval officer killed in the Korean War.
- Rear Admiral Daniel Gallery, a Naval Aviator, commanded the Naval Air Reserve Training Command at NAS Glenview from 1952 to 1954. As a Navy Captain during World War II, Gallery led the task group which captured the German submarine U-505, which is now on display at Chicago's Museum of Science & Industry.
- Lieutenant Commander Edward H. "Butch" O'Hare, a Naval Aviator and Chicago native, during World War II became the U.S. Navy's first ever flying ace and is the first ever U.S. Navy Aviator to be awarded the Medal of Honor.
- Meinhardt Raabe, who portrayed the coroner in The Wizard of Oz, served with the Civil Air Patrol at NAS Chicago / NAS Glenview during World War II.

== Accidents and incidents ==
- On 2 December 1943, four fliers of the Glenview NAS were killed when two Navy Stearman N2S-4 aircraft collided shortly after take off from the NAS. Killed were Ens. Edward Stanley Gardner, Lt. (jg) Edmund J. Wegner, Cadet John A. Waterman, and Cadet Kazimierz Puchalski. Ensign Gardner, 30, was a native of Poughkeepsie, NY. His widow was from Candor, NY and they were married in May 1943. Ensign Gardner is buried in Poughkeepsie, NY.
- On 30 May 1943, two Marine Corps aviators were killed when their planes collided above Pfingsten and Willow Road in Glenview. The Marines were flying in formation, returning to the base on maneuvers from the USS Wolverine on Lake Michigan.
- On 26 May 1944, during a training flight, Milton C. Pickens lost altitude above Deerfield and circled the village's downtown while trying to regain altitude. He crashed into the garden of Stanley Antes, who was working in the garden at the time. The plane buried itself six feet into the ground and Pickens was killed. The site, at 914 Waukegan Road, is now the location of the Deerfield Public Library. A plaque commemorates Pickens's death.
- On 11 June 1947, an aircraft departing NAS Glenview to participate in an air show over downtown Chicago was forced to crash land in a field near Willow and Waukegan Roads in Glenview. The aircraft's landing gear broke off, but the two flyers were uninjured and no one on the ground was injured.
- On 15 January 1951, a USAF Douglas B-26C, AF Ser. No. 44-35736, (built as an A-26C-45-DT), of the 168th Bomb Squadron, Illinois Air National Guard, flying from the Air National Guard base at O'Hare International Airport to NAS Glenview, crashed into a farmer's field in Northbrook along Willow Road after it developed a problem with ice forming on the wings. All four crewmen and a passenger were killed, but there were no casualties on the ground.
- On 19 April 1956, LCDR Gordon Arthur Stanley, USNR, was lost in a Grumman F9F-6 Cougar jet fighter when he lost control at 19,000 feet over Lake Michigan at 1330 hrs local time. Although he ejected, his chute apparently failed to deploy and he was killed. The fighter impacted in the lake one half mile off of Fort Sheridan. Stanley was an ace, having scored eight aerial victories with VF-27 during World War II.
- On 31 May 1959, a U.S. Marine Corps AD Skyraider flying into NAS Glenview from MCAS Cherry Point crashed in an adjacent cemetery killing the pilot, 1stLt William Byrne, USMC. Byrne's widow, Jane, would eventually become Mayor of Chicago.
- On 5 September 1963, a North American AF-1E Fury, BuNo 143560, of VF-725, Naval Reserve, based at NAS Glenview, Illinois, suffered engine failure. The pilot, LT Don J. "Skip" Mellem, USNR, ejected through the canopy and survived. The fighter struck the front of a home in Northbrook, just off the base; a woman escaped out the backdoor and survived.
- On 8 July 1968, an A-4B Skyhawk piloted by LT William T. Reinders, USNR, crashed after takeoff into a Glenview home, killing a 13-year-old girl. The pilot said he could have missed the house if he had dropped external fuel tanks from the plane. He ejected at the last moment and was injured.
- On 20 January 1977, a U.S. Coast Guard Sikorsky HH-52A Seaguard – CG tail number 1448, struck three electrical transmission wires and crashed into the ice-filled Illinois River. The crew had been performing an aerial ice patrol along the Illinois and Mississippi Rivers. The names of the personnel killed in the incident were: LTJG Frederick William Caesar III, USN; LTJG John Francis Taylor, USCG; AT2 John B. Johnson, USCG, and Mr. Jim Simpson (Civilian). The aircraft and crew were assigned to AIRSTA Chicago.
- On 12 August 1978, a British Royal Air Force Avro Vulcan B2 bomber, serial number XL390 of No. 617 Squadron, Royal Air Force, crashed while leaving after an air display. The crash occurred after a possible stall at around 400 ft (120 m), during a wing-over. The plane crashed into a landfill just north of Willow Road to avoid surrounding residential areas. All four crew members aboard perished.
- On 16 August 1986, a U.S. Air Force F-16 Fighting Falcon piloted by Capt Vince Aamato, USAF, lost power at 15,000 feet and was guided to a safe landing at NAS Glenview by Jeff McCoy, an air traffic controller at O'Hare.
- On 3 March 1991, a U.S. Navy CT-39G Sabreliner crashed into a residential area at Dewes Street during a visual approach to NAS Glenview. All three crew members aboard perished. As the jet approached the street, the pilot turned the plane such that the wings were perpendicular to the street in "knife-blade" fashion. The jet crashed into the center of the street, and the only damage on the ground was fire damage to the front of 2 houses and a few trees were burned. The village established a scholarship fund for the survivors of the crew.
