= MTR Western =

Motorcoach operator

- Founded: 2003
- Headquarters: Seattle, Washington
- Locale: USA
- Service area: Western United States
- Service type: contract service, charter service
- Hubs: Seattle (main office), Portland, Eugene, Spokane
- Fleet: Federal Mini Coach; Krystal Mini Coach; Prevost H3-45, X3-45; Setra S417; TEMSA Safari; Van Hool Double Decker
- Chief executive: Marka Waechter
- Website: MTR Western

MTR Western is an American motorcoach operator active in the western United States and Canada.

== Services ==
MTR Western provides group charters, sightseeing tours, driver-narrated tour programs, and on-call emergency transportation.

Charter clients include corporate customers such as Microsoft, Nike, Intel, Google, and Yahoo, in addition to touring entertainers, campaigning political candidates, and college and professional sports teams. They carry essentially all of the NFL and Major League Baseball teams that visit Seattle.

Tour clients include Tauck World Discovery, American West Steamboat Company, Caravan Tours, Contiki Tours, and Trafalgar Tours.

MTR Western operates two lines of the POINT Intercity Bus Service in Oregon.

== History ==
MTR Western was founded in Seattle, Washington in 2003 by Darren Berg with four Prevost H3-45 motorcoaches. By 2007, they were one of the largest premium motorcoach companies in North America, with facilities in Seattle, Portland, Spokane, Eugene, The Dalles, San Francisco, Salt Lake City, Vancouver, and Calgary, and winner of the BUSRide 2006 Motorcoach Industry Achievement Award.

MTR Western's three-year growth of 1,214.9% earned it national recognition in Inc. Magazine's "Inc. 500", a list of America's fastest growing private companies in 2007. The list ranks MTR Western as number 166 in the U.S., number 9 in Washington State, and number 3 in the Transportation category.

In 2008 they debuted in Metro Magazine's "Motorcoach Top 50" at number 17. MTR Western is known for their award-winning "compelling and creative" bus wrap designs.

Darren Berg funneled millions of dollars from a Ponzi scheme into MTR Western. After Berg's arrest in 2010, he filed for Chapter 11 bankruptcy, and a bankruptcy trustee sold Berg's assets. On January 14, 2011, MTR announced the sale of MTR Western and OC&W Coachways to GTO LLC. The lead investor in GTO is Howard S. Wright III, co-owner of the Space Needle.

=== Gregoire license plate controversy ===
On April 10, 2008, MTR Western became involved in a controversy between the Washington State Republican Party and Democratic Governor Christine Gregoire. In a press release, State Republican Party Chairman Luke Esser said, "Gov. Gregoire has been making it harder and harder for businesses to survive here in our state for three years, so it's no surprise that her campaign hired a bus with Oregon license plates to save money. The symbolism of Gov. Gregoire's bus tour couldn't be plainer."

Washington-based MTR Western responded the next day with a press release citing Federal law: "Our Oregon license plates are issued pursuant to the International Registration Plan (IRP), which was created by wise federal legislation put into place to simplify the registration of commercial vehicles that travel in interstate commerce," said MTR Western CEO and founder Darren Berg. "It's disheartening to be associated with misleading statements that support an opinion that business opportunities are grim in the state of Washington."

One columnist from traditionally Republican Eastern Washington wrote of the controversy, "On Thursday the state Republican Party issued a press release titled "Gregoire Driving An Oregon Bus on Re-Election Tour" that screamed of scandal... Long story short, there’s no story here, much less a full blown scandal."

== Associated Companies ==
=== OC&W Coachways ===
MTR Western purchased Eugene, Oregon-based Oregon Coachways in 2006 from owners Donald Moorehead and John Mikulvich. The company, now named OC&W Coachways, provides no-frills charter bus service in Oregon, California, and Washington.

=== GeoGenius ===
GeoGenius, LLC
- Type: Privately held company
- Industry: Tourism
- Founded: 2007
- Founder: Darren Berg
- Headquarters: Seattle, Washington; USA
- Products: GPS-triggered travel guides
- Website: GeoGenius

GeoGenius was a company based in Seattle, Washington that produced travel-related audio and video content for GPS-enabled devices.

GeoGenius was founded by CEO Darren Berg in 2007. The company's first client was the parent company, which contracted them to develop GPS-triggered audio and video content for use by their motorcoach tour customers.

The GeoGenius proof of concept, a multiple channel, multiple interest, GPS-triggered 7-day tour from San Francisco to Seattle, commenced operation in May, 2007. Another video tour was scheduled to be installed on MTR Western's "hop on, hop off" city sightseeing tour of Vancouver, B.C. in April 2008. Historical and travel-related content is featured on other tours of Vancouver operated by MTR Western subsidiary Sightline Tours.

The company was developing content for personal download to multiple platforms, allowing tourists to construct their own tours.

GeoGenius development was overseen by Lorayne Deceour.
