= Scott Bedbury =

American advertising executive

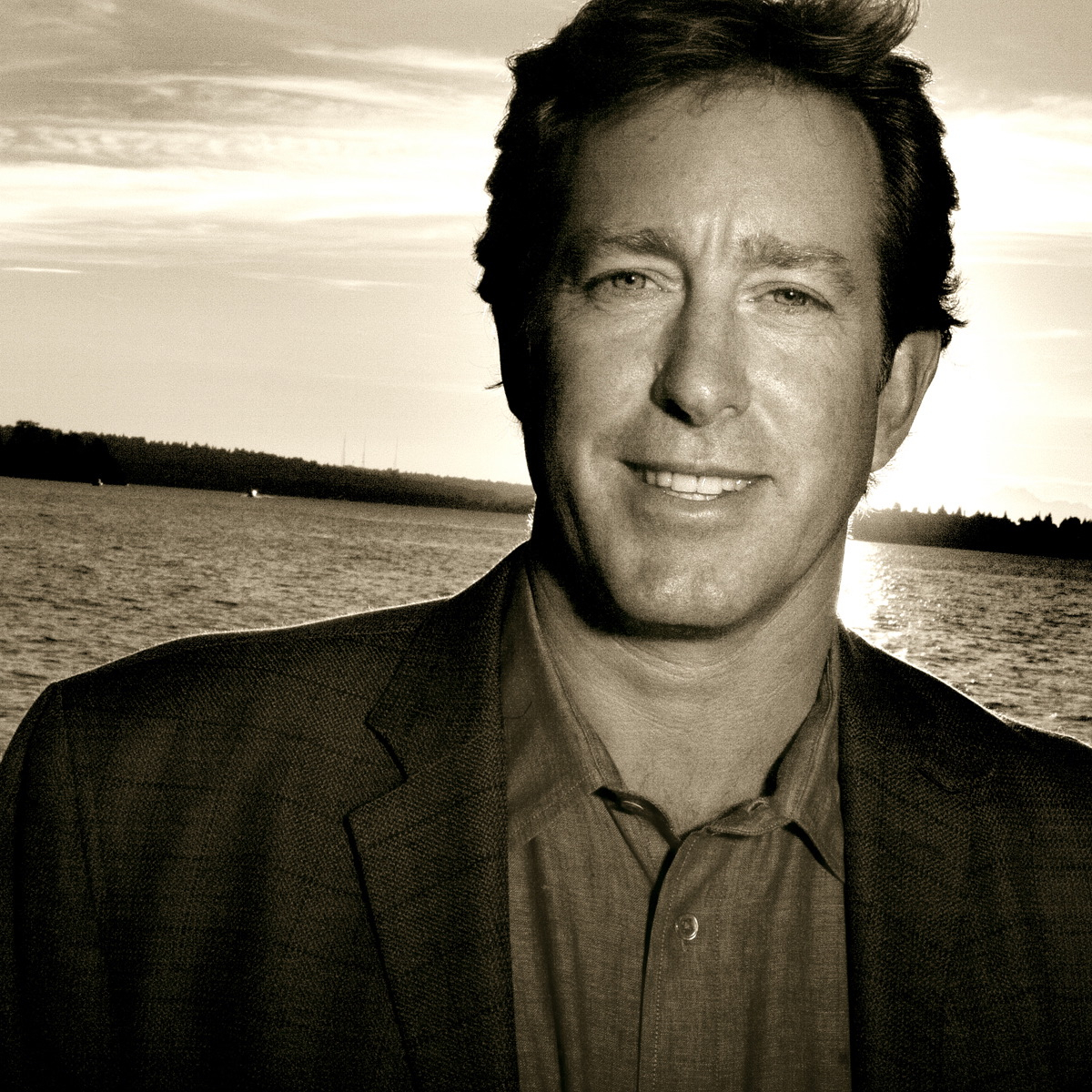
- Born: October 3, 1957 (age 68); Eugene, Oregon, U.S.
- Education: University of Oregon
- Occupation: Branding consultant

Scott A. Bedbury (born October 3, 1957) is an American branding consultant. He is CEO of Brandstream, a branding firm, and co-founder and chairman of Upstream Research, an analytics startup. He was Nike's advertising director from 1987 to 1994, and Starbucks' chief marketing officer from 1995 to 1998. In 2012, Advertising Age ranked Bedbury in the top ten clients bringing "guts and innovation to the business".

== Education ==
In 1980, Bedbury graduated from the University of Oregon's School of Journalism and Communication (SOJC) with a Bachelor of Science in Journalism. The University of Oregon Alumni Association named him an Outstanding Young Alumnus in 1997.

== Career ==
Bedbury began his career with Nike in 1987 as worldwide advertising director. In 1988, Bedbury and Nike's advertising agency, Wieden & Kennedy, launched "Just Do It", a global campaign that helped move the company from distant third to number one. The "Just Do It" campaign opened up the access point to the brand and made it more ageless, more relevant and more multi-cultural. In 1989, Bedbury's work with the Nike-Women's Fitness Campaign diversified the audience further, "repositioning Nike as a meaningful brand to women".

Bedbury joined Starbucks as its chief marketing officer in 1995 in Seattle, Washington. In his first year, Bedbury helped launch the Frappuccino and open Starbucks' first international stores in Japan. Bedbury worked with former Nike and Starbucks insights director Jerome Conlon to create the "Third Place" positioning, which is described as, "not home (1st place) or work (2nd place) it's somewhere in between, a public hang out."

Bedbury left Starbucks in 1998 and started his own branding consulting firm, Brandstream. Between 2011 and 2013, Bedbury served as an advisor to Airbnb CEO Brian Chesky.

== A New Brand World ==
Bedbury published his first book, A New Brand World in 2002.
