= Grodzins =

Grodzins is a surname occurring mainly in the United States. The name has Jewish and Polish roots. Notable people with the surname include:

- Lee Grodzins (1926–2025), American physicist, brother of Anne and Ethel
- Morton Grodzins (1917–1964), American political scientist

== See also ==
- Anne Grodzins Lipow (1935–2004), American librarian, sister of Ethel
- Ethel Grodzins Romm (1925–2021), American author, journalist, and project manager
- Grodziński, a Polish surname
