= Deborah A. Carver =

American academic librarian

Dean Emerita Deborah A. Carver
- Born: Deborah Ann Carver; 1951 (age 74–75)
- Occupation: Retired university librarian
- Known for: Free borrowing program providing access to state university holdings for any Oregon resident with a public library card
- Board member of: Director, Association of Research Libraries; American Library Association representative to Oregon Library Association Board; Orbis Cascade Alliance Council
- Spouse: John Milo Pegg
- Awards: Oregon Librarian of the Year (1999); OLA Distinguished Service Award (2014)

Deborah A. Carver (born 1951) is a retired Philip H. Knight Dean of Libraries at the University of Oregon (UO) in the United States.

== Education and personal life ==
Carver is a 1973 political science graduate, magna cum laude, from the University of Massachusetts Amherst. Carver's 1976 library science master's degree is from the University of North Carolina at Chapel Hill, and her 1984 public administration master's degree is from the University of Virginia, Charlottesville.

Carver met her husband John Pegg when she enrolled in his mountaineering class. Together, they have climbed all major mountain peaks on the west coast of the United States.

Carver serves on the Eugene Symphony Board of Directors.

== Career ==
Carver began at UO in 1990 as an assistant university librarian for public services. She became dean of libraries in 2002. She also provided leadership within the Oregon Library Association (OLA). In 2011, Carver secured a grant from the National Endowment for the Humanities to create archival finding aids for 28 archives included in the Northwest Digital Archives.

During her tenure at the University of Oregon since 1990, Carver oversaw significant changes in services and facilities:

UO enrollments grew by almost 70% and the library grew with them. 132,000 square feet were added to the main library building and it was named in honor of the Knight family. A new library branch was opened in the Global Scholars Hall, and work began on a major expansion and renovation of the Science Library. Card catalogs gave way to online catalogs; e-journals signaled a major shift in scholarly publishing models; instructional technologies played a bigger and bigger part in the classroom.

Carver served as president of the Pacific Northwest Library Association in 1995–1996. In 2002, Carver chaired the task force that developed the OLA plan to provide all Oregon residents with access to Oregon's research library collections.

== Awards and legacy ==
She was named OLA's Oregon Librarian of the Year in 1999.

Carver was named Philip H. Knight University Librarian, an endowed chair, in July 2002.

In 2014, she received the OLA Distinguished Service Award, and the nomination letter noted, "She has never wavered from the vision of the Orbis Cascade Alliance as a shared resource for all students and faculty in the region."

== Selected publications ==
- Carver, Deborah A. "Transformational leadership: A bibliographic essay." Library Administration & Management 3 (1989): 30–34.
- Carver, Deborah A. "Creating effective manuals: A bibliographic essay." Library Administration & Management v. 4 (Summer 1990) p. 145–8.
- Lipow, Anne, and Deborah Carver. Staff Development: A Practical Guide. Chicago, IL: American Library Association, Library Administration and Management Association. (1992).
- Carver, Deborah. "From Circulation to Access Services – The Shift in Academic Library Organization," Collection Management, Volume 17:1–2 (1993).
- Carver, Deborah A. "True confessions: The real impact of regional library networks." Technical Services Quarterly 18.1 (2000): 13–23.
- Avery, Elizabeth Fuseler, Terry Dahlin and Deborah Carver, eds. Staff development: A practical guide (3rd ed). Chicago: ALA Editions. (2001).
- Carver, D. A., Breen, R. F., Oberg, L. R., Sparanese, A. C., & Spalti, M. (2002). Moveable Type; Vol. 10 No. 1 (Fall 2002).
- Carver, Deborah A. "Should librarians get tenure? No, it can hamper their roles." Chronicle of Higher Education 52.6 (2005): B10–B11.
- Carver, Deborah A. "Organizational models and roles." Journal of Access Services 7.2 (2010): 72–83.
- Carver, Deborah. "Statewide database licensing the Oregon way." OLA Quarterly 4.4 (2014): 7+.
- Carver, Deborah A. "From the president: Intellectual freedom: Liberties and liabilities." OLA Quarterly 1.4 (2014): 13.
- Carver, Deborah. "Vision 2010: Knife Edge Ridge." OLA Quarterly 7.3 (2014): 1.
- Carver, Deborah A. "Visions of the Future: A Planning Process for State Library Associations." OLA Quarterly 6.3 (2014): 2+.

== See also ==
- Academic library
- List of Knight endowed chairs and professorships
