= Mary Christina Wood =

- Born: 1962 (age 63–64)
- Education: Stanford Law School (J.D.)
- Occupations: professor, lawyer, author, and lecturer
- Website: law.uoregon.edu/faculty/mwood/

Mary Christina Wood (born 1962) is an Oregon Philip H. Knight Professor of Law and author, best known for her writings advocating for the use of the public trust doctrine to compel government action on climate change. Wood originated the approach, called atmospheric trust litigation, "to hold governments worldwide accountable for reducing carbon pollution within their jurisdictions, and her research is being used in cases and petitions brought on behalf of children and youth throughout the United States and in other countries."

In 2014, after a number of atmospheric trust litigation and petitions were brought by young people worldwide, Forbes contributor James Conca wrote, "If the Supreme Court holds the government responsible for at least trying to protect our atmosphere, things could certainly change here in America."

== Early life ==
Wood grew up "watching salmon at a place called Wood's Landing, located on the Columbia River in the State of Washington."

== Education ==
Wood graduated from Stanford Law School in 1987.

== Career ==
After graduating from Stanford Law School in 1987, Wood served as a judicial clerk on the United States Court of Appeals for the Ninth Circuit. She then practiced in the environmental/natural resources department of Perkins Coie, a Pacific Northwest law firm.

=== Law professor ===
Wood is the Philip H. Knight Professor of Law and Faculty Director of the University of Oregon School of Law's Environmental and Natural Resources Law Program. She teaches property law, natural resources law, public trust law, and federal Indian law, and has also taught public lands law, wildlife law, and hazardous waste law. She is the Founding Director of the school's nationally acclaimed Environmental and Natural Resources Law Program and is Faculty Leader of the Program's Conservation Trust Project, Sustainable Land Use Project, Native Environmental Sovereignty Project, and Food Resilience Project.

=== Author ===
Wood's book, Nature's Trust: Environmental Law for a New Ecological Age, was published by Cambridge University Press in 2014. An excerpt of the book was spotlighted by Moyers & Company in September 2014. Prior to Nature's Trust: Environmental Law for a New Ecological Age, Wood had co-authored a leading textbook on natural resources law (West, 2006), and a textbook on public trust law (Carolina Press, 2013).

Wood's work asserting the public trust doctrine's application to the atmosphere has inspired what has been coined atmospheric trust litigation. One non-profit organizing such litigation, Our Children's Trust, has brought a suit on behalf of 21 youth plaintiffs against the US government for its actions contributing to climate change. When the federal judge in that case denied both the federal government and the American Petroleum Institute's motion to dismiss on April 8, 2016, Wood told NPR station KLCC this:

"Basically, what the court is saying is that the government must come into court and defend against these allegations that the government has taken action to put the youth in extreme danger including actions that literally impair their potential survival."

=== Lecturer, speaker ===
On January 1, 2015, Bill Moyers hosted Wood as his last guest on the last episode of Moyers & Company.

=== Awards ===
In 1994, Wood received the University's Ersted Award for Distinguished Teaching, and in 2002 she received the Orlando Hollis Faculty Teaching Award. On March 7, 2015, Wood was awarded the 2015 David Brower Lifetime Achievement Award.
