= Eric C. Torrence =

American physicist and professor

- Born: 1968 (age 57–58)
- Education: B.S. 1990, University of Washington; Ph.D., 1997 Massachusetts Institute of Technology
- Awards: Fellow, American Physical Society, 2024
- Scientific career
- Fields: High energy particles and fields
- Workplaces: University of Oregon
- Thesis: Search for Anomalous Couplings in the Decay of Polarized Z Bosons to Tau Lepton Pairs
- Doctoral advisor: Richard K. Yamamoto

Eric C. Torrence (born 1968) is an American experimental particle physicist at the University of Oregon who conducts research on elementary particles and fields.

== Early life and education ==
Eric Torrence complete his Bachelor of Science degree at the University of Washington in 1990. He earned his Ph.D. at the Massachusetts Institute of Technology in June 1997, with his dissertation, Search for Anomalous Couplings in the Decay of Polarized Z Bosons to Tau Lepton Pairs, advised by Richard K. Yamamoto.

== Career and research ==
Eric Torrence joined the Physics Department at the University of Oregon in 2000. An experimental particle physicist, he uses particle accelerators to study basic properties of matter and fundamental forces of nature. He has conducted research at the Large Hadron Collider and FASER collaborations at CERN in Switzerland, and he is a member of the ATLAS collaboration.

=== Ph.D. graduates advised ===
- Jeffery A. Kolb
- John Myers
- Rahmat Rhamat

== Honors and awards ==
- 2008 University of Oregon Faculty Excellence Award. The university's Physics Newsletter reported that Torrence's "leading role today in the tau physics efforts of the ATLAS experiment places him at the center of physics in the coming decade."
- 2022 Tykeson Award for Excellence in Undergraduate Teaching. Hal Sadofsky, divisional dean for the natural sciences, said, "Professor Torrence's attention to his students and their success, while he pursues a highly active and visible research program, epitomize the ideals of the teacher-scholar."
- 2024 Fellow, American Physical Society, cited For significant contributions with the ATLAS and FASER Collaborations, particularly in the searches for new physics, measurement of the LHC luminosity, and for leadership in the operations of both experiments.
