= NWDA =

NWDA may refer to:

- National Water Development Agency, India
- Northwest Regional Development Agency, England
- Northwest Digital Archives, USA
