= Judith R. Baskin =

American religious studies scholar and professor

- Born: 1950 (age 75–76); Hamilton, Ontario, Canada
- Occupation: Faculty
- Title: Philip H. Knight Professor of Humanities; Associate Dean for Humanities; Director of the Harold Schnitzer Family Program in Judaic Studies
- Spouse: Warren Stuart Ginsberg
- Awards: 2010 National Jewish Book Award for Anthologies and Collections

Academic background
- Education: Antioch College, Yale University
- Thesis: Reflections of Attitudes towards the Gentiles in Jewish and Christian Exegesis of Jethro, Balaam, and Job (1976)

Academic work
- Discipline: Religion
- Institutions: University of Oregon; University at Albany, SUNY; University of Massachusetts, Amherst
- Main interests: Jewish women; Jewish history, religion and culture

Judith Reesa Baskin (born 1950) is a religious studies scholar at the University of Oregon in the United States. She is Associate Dean for Humanities, Director of the Harold Schnitzer Family Program in Judaic Studies, and the Philip H. Knight Professor of Humanities. She held positions at the University of Massachusetts Amherst, Yale University, and State University of New York at Albany, prior to accepting a faculty position at the University of Oregon in 2000. She was appointed Associate Dean for Humanities in the College of Arts and Sciences in July, 2009.

== Early life and education ==
Judith Reesa Baskin was born in 1950 in Hamilton, Ontario, Canada, the daughter of Bernard and Marjorie Ann (née Shatz) Baskin.

She earned a baccalaureate degree in 1971 from Antioch College, including a year abroad at Hebrew University of Jerusalem. Yale University awarded her a Doctor of Philosophy degree in Medieval Studies in 1976.

She is married to Warren Stuart Ginsberg, and the two have a son and daughter.

== Career ==
From 1976–1988 Baskin taught at the University of Massachusetts Amherst. In 1991, early in her academic career, she wrote she saw her work adding to "general knowledge of the diversity and richness of Jewish women's pasts".

From 1988–2000 she taught at the University at Albany, SUNY, and served as Chair of the Department of Judaic Studies. Baskin has been at the University of Oregon since 2000 as Director of the Harold Schnitzer Family Program in Judaic Studies and Philip H. Knight Professor of Humanities, and in July 2009 she was named Associate Dean for Humanities in the College of Arts and Sciences.

Baskin has written and edited books on topics in Jewish history and culture:

- Pharaoh's Counsellors: Job, Jethro and Balaam in Rabbinic and Patristic Tradition. Scholars Press. 1983. ISBN 978-0891306375.
- Midrashic Women: Formations of the Feminine in Rabbinic Literature. Brandeis University Press. 2002. ISBN 978-1584651789.
- Jewish Women in Historical Perspective. Wayne State University Press. 1991. ISBN 0814320910.
- Women of the Word: Jewish Women and Jewish Writing. Wayne State University Press. 1994. ISBN 9780814324233.
- Editor, The Cambridge Dictionary of Judaism and Jewish Culture (2011)
- Co-editor with Shelly Tenenbaum, Gender and Jewish Studies: A Curriculum Guide (1994)
- Co-editor with Kenneth Seeskin, The Cambridge Guide to Jewish History, Religion, and Culture (2010), 2010 National Jewish Book Award winner, first place in anthologies and collections

== Selected honors and awards ==
Baskin served as President of the Association for Jewish Studies from 2004 through 2006, and is listed as an "Honorary Director" of the association.

Hebrew Union College-Jewish Institute of Religion, Los Angeles campus, awarded Baskin a Doctor of Humane Letters, honoris causa, in 2012. The citation noted, "An academic leader, prize-winning teacher and prolific author, Dr. Baskin has taken a scholarly approach to the place of Jewish women in historical perspective."

Baskin's record of scholarship and research has earned other honors:

- 1971–76, Danforth Foundation Fellow
- 1971, Woodrow Wilson Fellow (Honorary)
- 1980, American Council of Learned Societies: Semester Research Grant for Recent Recipients of the Ph.D.
- 1993, Chancellor's Award for Excellence in Teaching, SUNY system
- 1995, Collins Fellow (awarded for Outstanding Service, University at Albany)
- 2002–present, Philip H. Knight Professor of Humanities, University of Oregon
- 2010, National Jewish Book Award, co-editor with Kenneth Seeskin, The Cambridge Survey of Jewish History, Religion, and Culture

== See also ==
- Jewish Encyclopedia
