= Benjamin Harshav =

Lithuanian-born literary theorist

- בנימין הרשב
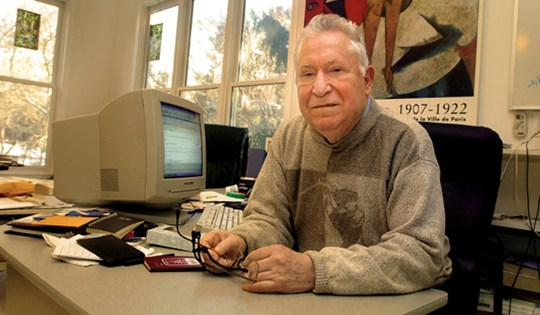
- Born: 26 June 1928; Vilnius, Poland
- Died: 23 April 2015 (aged 86); New Haven, Connecticut, US
- Spouse: Barbara Harshav
- Children: Ehud Hrushovski
- Parents: Abraham Hrushovski; Dvora Freidkes-Hrushovski
- Awards: Koret Jewish Book Award; EMET Prize

Benjamin Harshav (Hebrew: בנימין הרשב), born Hrushovski (Hebrew: הרושובסקי; June 26, 1928 – April 23, 2015), was a literary theorist specialising in comparative literature, a Yiddish and Hebrew poet (under pen names including H. Benjamin (Hebrew: ה. בנימין) and Gabi Daniel (Hebrew: גבי דניאל)), and an Israeli translator and editor. He served as professor of literature at the University of Tel Aviv and as a professor of comparative literature, Hebrew language and literature, and Slavic languages and literature at Yale University. He was the founding editor of the Duke University Press publication Poetics Today. He received the EMET Prize for Art, Science and Culture in 2005 and was a member of the American Academy of Arts and Sciences.

== Early life ==
Benjamin Harshav was born as Benjamin Hrushovski (Hruszowski) in 1928, in Vilnius, capital of today's Lithuania (then Polish city Vilno.) His parents were both educators: Dr Abraham Hrushovski (Hebrew surname Agasi, Hebrew: אגסי), his father, was a history teacher who taught in various gymnasiums In Vilnius and later in Haifa (died in 1973); Dvora Freidkes-Hrushovski (1896–1985), his mother, was a mathematics teacher and school headmistress in Vilnius. He had a younger sister, Eta Hrushovski (Hebrew: אטה הרושובסקי), born 1935, who died in 1968 during a trip in Turkey.

Harshav studied in a secular Yiddish school and Yiddish gymnasium. In September 1939, under the terms of the Molotov–Ribbentrop Pact, Vilnius was captured by the Red Army, then handed over to Lithuania; but again taken and annexed to the Soviet Union in August 1940. In 1941, as Germany invaded the Soviet Union in Operation Barbarossa, his family fled Eastward to the Ural Mountains. He finished his senior exams in a Russian school in 1945, and in 1945–46 studied mathematics and physics at Orenburg, where he won the first prize for first-year students. Abraham Hrushovski was appointed director of an institution for Polish war orphans living in the Soviet Union, and in May 1946 the family was able to return to Poland in a special train along with the orphans. Benjamin joined the Zionist youth movement Dror, and studied in the Dror Seminar first in Lodz, then, after illegally crossing the border to Czechoslovakia and then to Germany, in Munich and in the DP camp Indersdorf In Munich, in 1947–48, Harshav co-edited the Dror's publication "להבות". His life in these years, in the shadow of the Holocaust, is reflected in his Yiddish poetry book, "שטויבן (Dusts)", published in Munich in 1948.

In May 1948, Harshav immigrated to the nascent state of Israel through the illegal Aliyah Bet. His parents and sister, attempting earlier to arrive on another ship, were detained in a British camp in Cyprus and arrived later. Harshav enlisted in the Palmach and fought in the 1947–1949 Palestine war, the 1948 Arab–Israeli War, as part of the fifth battalion until 1949.

== Academic career ==
=== 1948–1986: Living in Israel ===
From 1948 to 1986, Harshav lived in Jerusalem and Tel Aviv. From 1949 to 1957, he studied for degrees in Hebrew literature, Biblical Studies, Jewish History, and Yiddish literature at the Hebrew University of Jerusalem. In 1951 he was amongst the founders of The group of Yiddish poets "יונג ישראל". Meanwhile, he also founded and edited the literary journal "Likrat" (Hebrew: לקראת) with Aryeh Sivan, Moshe Dor, and Natan Zach. From 1957 to 1960 he studied comparative literature at Yale University with René Wellek.

Harshav taught Hebrew literature at the Hebrew University of Jerusalem from 1954 to 1957 and 1960–63. From 1963 to 1966 he served as a lecturer of comparative literature and Russian literature. In 1965, he became the founding head of the Department of Poetics and Comparative Literature at the University of Tel Aviv. In 1968, he founded Hasifrut, a scientific Hebrew literature magazine published by the University of Tel Aviv.

From 1971 to 1973, Harshav went on sabbatical to Berkeley, California, where he was a guest professor of comparative literature and Slavic literature at UCB. He took up the same position in 1977, and in the autumn of 1978. In the summer of 1972, Harshav was a professor of literary theory at the Indiana University in Bloomington.

In 1975, Harshav founded the Israeli Institute for Poetics and Semiotics at the University of Tel Aviv, today known as the Porter Institute of Poetics and Semiotics. He stood at the head of the institute until 1987. He founded and edited the international publication of the Porter Institute, Poetics and Theory of Literature. After the publication was shut down, he founded Poetics Today, a quarterly journal published by Duke University Press. In 1974, he founded the series Literature, Meaning, Culture (Hebrew: ספרות, משמעות, תרבות) and served as editor-in-chief until 1986.

In 1976–77, Harshav was a fellow at the centre of advanced degrees in Hebrew literature at Oxford University. In the autumn of 1980 he was a guest professor of classical and modern Hebrew and Jewish literature at Harvard University. In 1982, he was appointed to the Porter Chair of literary theory and poetics at the University of Tel Aviv.

In the summer of 1983, Harshav was a professor of poetics and structuralism in a summer program hosted by Indiana University, as well as a professor of Yiddish linguistics at the University of Columbia. From 1983 to 1985, he was a fellow at the Institute for Advanced Study in Berlin. In the summer of 1985, he was a guest professor of comparative literature at Dartmouth College in Hanover, New Hampshire. In the winter of 1986, he was a guest professor of Middle Eastern studies at the University of Colombia. From 1986 to 1987, he was a guest professor of comparative literature at Yale University. From 1986 to his death in 2015, Harshav lived in New Haven, Connecticut, where Yale University is situated, and became a US citizen.

=== 1987–2015: Living in Connecticut ===
In 1987, Harshav took early retirement from the University of Tel Aviv and joined Yale University as a professor of comparative literature, where he was appointed Blaustein Chair of Hebrew Language and Literature. He also became a professor of Slavic Languages at Yale in 1992. He upheld both of these positions until his retirement in 2011. From 1998 to 2000, he was the director of advanced degrees at the department of comparative literature.

From 1971 to 1998, Harshav was a member of the board of directors of the International Association for Semiotic Studies (IASS). From 1972, he was a member of the Hebrew Writers Association in Israel. From 1993, he was a fellow of the United States Authors Guild. From 1985 to 1991, he was a member of the International Comparative Literature Association (ICLA). In 1995, Harshav was chosen as a fellow of the American Academy of Arts and Sciences.

In 1997, Harshav received a silver medal from the University of Rome Tor Vergata along with his wife, Barbara Harshav, for his studies and translations. In 2004, he won the Koret Jewish Book Award for biographical literature, for his two-volume book about Marc Chagall, Marc Chagall and his Times. In 2000, he won the Jerusalem Prize. He won the EMET Prize in 2005 for his life's work, and the Akveyhu Prize (Hebrew: עקביהו) for the study of Hebrew poetry in 2008.

Harshav published an anthology of his Yiddish and Hebrew poems. He translated his own work into Hebrew from Yiddish, English, and German. He also translated into English.

=== Awards ===
- December 1998 – Silver Medal, University of Rome Tor Vergata (along with wife, Barbara Harshav)
- 1999 – An Overcoat for Benjamin (Hebrew: אדרת לבנימין)
- 29 March 2004 – Koret Jewish Book Award for Biography, Autobiography, and Literary Studies, for his book Marc Chagall and his Times
- 2005 – EMET Prize for Art, Science, and Culture

== Bibliography ==
- The Rhythm of Largeness: Theory and Practice in Uri-Zvi Grinberg's Expressionist Poetry (Hebrew: ריתמוס הרחבות: הלכה ומעשה בשירתו האקספרסיוניסטית של אורי צבי גרינברג), Hakibbutz Hameuchad Publishing House, 1987
- The Poems of Gabi Daniel(Hebrew: שירי גבי דניאל), Siman Kri'a, 1990
- The Art of Poetry (Hebrew: אמנות השירה), Carmel Publishers, 2000
- Poetry of the Hebrew Revival: A Critical and Historical Anthology (Hebrew: שירת התחיה העברית : אנתולוגיה היסטורית-ביקורתית), The Open University of Israel, 2000
- Fields and Frames: Studies in the Theory of Literature and Meaning (Hebrew: שדה ומסגרת: מסות בתאוריה של ספרות ומשמעות), Carmel Publishers, 2000
- The Poetry of the Self in New York: Portraits of Four Yiddish Poets and a Selection of their Poems in Hebrew Translation (Hebrew: שירת היחיד בניו-יורק: דיוקנאות של ארבעה משוררי יידיש ומבחר שיריהם בתרגום עברי). Carmel Publishers, 2002
- The Other Culture: Yiddish and Hebrew Dialogue (Hebrew: התרבות האחרת: יידיש והשיח היהודי). Carmel Publishers, 2006
- Meter and Rhythm in Modern Hebrew Poetry (Hebrew: משקל וריתמוס בשירה העברית החדשה). Carmel Publishers, The Open University of Israel, 2008
- Language in the Time of Revolution, Los Angeles and Berkeley: The University of California Press, 1993. ISBN 9780804735407
- The History of Hebrew Versification (Hebrew: תולדות הצורות של השירה העברית מן התנ"ך עד המודרניזם), Bar-Ilan University Press, 2008.

=== Books edited ===
- Exile of the Poets by Bertold Brecht, translated from German and edited. Ha'Kibutz Ha'Meuchad, 1978.
- Poet in New York by Jacob Glatstein, translated from Yiddish and edited. Siman Kri'a and Ha'Kibutz Ha'Meuchad.
- Manifestoes of Modernism. Carmel Publishers, 2001.

=== Books translated ===
==== Into Hebrew ====
- A. Glanz-Leyeles, Poems and Dramatic Visions [Poetry translated from Yiddish by B. Hrushovski], Jerusalem: Mosad Bialik 1960.
- In the Chariot of Fire: Poems and Long Poems (translated from Yiddish).
- The Golden Peacock: Poems and Long Poems (translated from Yiddish), Moyshe-Leyb Halpern, Mosad Bialik.
- Exile of the Poets: Selected Poetry 1914-1956 by Bertolt Brecht (translated from German), Ha'Kibutz Ha'Meuchad, 1978.
- Tevye the Milkman and other Monologues (translated from Yiddish), Siman Kri'a and Ha'Kibutz Ha'Meuchad, 1983.
- Sibir: long poem, Abraham Sutzkever (translated from Yiddish), Ha'Kibutz Ha'Meuchad, 1983.
- Modernist Poetry: Selected Translations (translated from English, French, Russian, German, and Yiddish), Am Oved, 1990.
- The Poems of Gabi Daniel (Hebrew: שירי גבי דניאל), Siman Kri'a, Tel Aviv, 1990
- The Street Drummer: Selected Poetry, Moyshe-Leyb Halpern, Mosad Bialik, 1993.
- Introspectivism in New York, including a selection of poems from A. Leyeles, Moznayim, 1986.
- Collected Poetry, Avoth Yeshurun, Siman Kri'a and Ha'Kibutz Ha'Meuchad, 2001
- A Gathering of Silences, Selected Poems, Avraham Sutzkever (translated from Yiddish), Am Oved, 2005.

==== Into English ====
- Akhziv, Caesarea and One Love, Yehuda Amichai (translated from Yiddish), Schocken Publishing House, 1996.
- Yeuhda Amichai, A Life of Poetry, (translated from Hebrew), Harper-Collins, 1994

== Festschrift in his honor ==
A Festschrift was written for Benjamin Harshav on his seventieth birthday by Ziva Ben-Porat under the name An Overcoat for Benjamin: Papers on Literature for Benjamin Harshav (Hebrew: אדרת לבנימין). Published by Ha'Kibutz Ha'Meuchad and the Porter Institute for Poetics and Semiotics, the work had two volumes. The first was published in 1999 and the second in 2001.
