= James E. Brau =

American physicist and professor

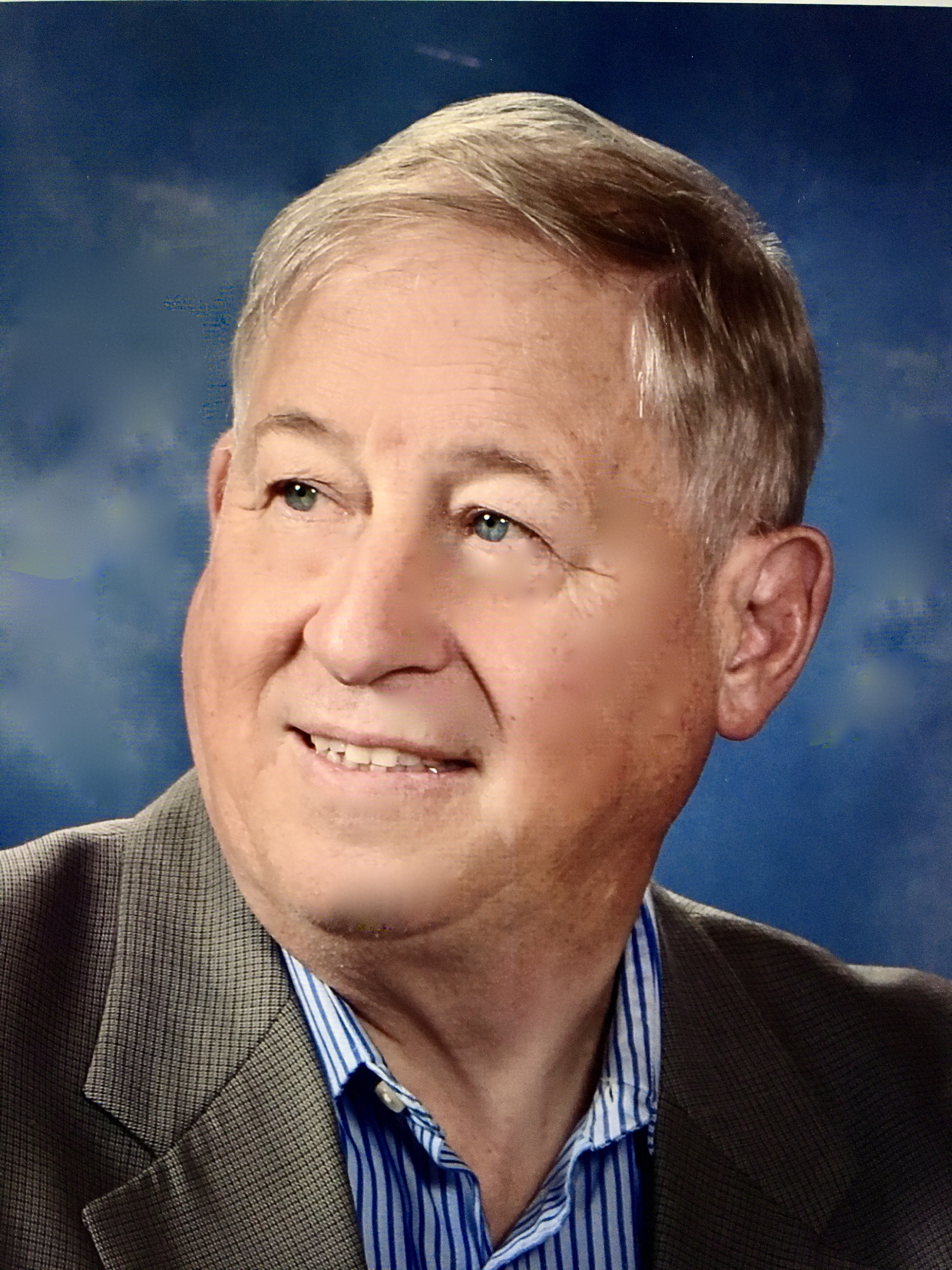
- Born: James Edward Brau; 1946 (age 79–80)
- Education: Massachusetts Institute of Technology
- Awards: Fellow, American Physical Society; Fellow, American Association for the Advancement of Science; Senior Member, Institute of Electrical and Electronics Engineers; Fellow, Hertz Foundation
- Scientific career
- Fields: High energy particles and fields
- Workplaces: Stanford Linear Accelerator Center; University of Tennessee; University of Oregon
- Thesis: Inclusive and Semi-inclusive Charge Structure in Pion-Proton Multiparticle Production Reactions at 150 GeV/c
- Doctoral advisor: Richard K. Yamamoto

James E. Brau (born 1946) is an American physicist and Professor of Natural Science Emeritus at the University of Oregon (UO) who has conducted research on elementary particles and fields. He founded the Oregon experimental high energy physics group in 1988 and served as director of the UO Center for High Energy Physics from 1997 to 2016. In 2006 he was appointed the Philip H. Knight Professor of Natural Science, an endowed professorship.

Prior to joining the Oregon faculty, he served in the Air Force and held positions at the Stanford Linear Accelerator Center and the University of Tennessee. He is a fellow of both the American Physical Society and also the American Association for the Advancement of Science.

== Personal life and education ==
James Edward Brau, son of James Ernest Brau and Rose (née Nist) Brau, was born in 1946 in Tacoma, Washington. He married Mary Williams in 1969. They have two adult sons (Benjamin and Daniel) and four grandchildren (Alex, Judson, Sarah, and Beckett).

Following his junior year at Lincoln High School, Brau participated in 1964 NSF-sponsored summer program at the University of Puget Sound, supervised by Prof. Z.F. Daneš, taking detailed gravitometer measurements of the Puget Sound area. He prepared a "Gravity map of Tacoma area, Washington (unpublished), University of Puget Sound, Tacoma, 1964", which contributed to his first scientific publication in 1965.

Brau served as student body president at Lincoln High School in Tacoma, where he graduated in 1965. He received an appointment from Rep. Thor Tollefson to the United States Air Force Academy (USAFA), where he double-majored in physics and mathematics, and was a member of Pi Mu Epsilon mathematics honorary fraternity.

On the USAFA Superintendent's List for academic and military excellence, Brau was also a member of Academy Student Section of American Institute of Physics, a member of Pi Mu Epsilon, and he earned the Maj. Gen. George O. Squier Award as outstanding cadet in physics. Brau earned a Bachelor of Science in 1969 as a Distinguished Graduate of the U.S. Air Force Academy.

Brau earned a Scientiæ Magister degree in physics in 1970 at the Massachusetts Institute of Technology, working with advisor Irwin A. Pless. Brau's Master's thesis, Prism Plot: A New Analysis of Multibody Final States was published in 1971. While serving at Kirtland AFB, Brau took graduate classes at the University of New Mexico in 1972–1973.

Brau received Fannie and John Hertz Foundation Fellowships (1969–1970 and 1974–77). Based on data collected at the Fermi National Accelerator Laboratory with research advisor Richard K. Yamamoto, in January 1978 Brau earned a Doctor of Philosophy degree in physics at MIT.

== Career and research ==
=== U.S. Air Force (1970–1974) ===
Brau served in the Guidance Test Directorate at Holloman Air Force Base (1970–1971), and in the Theoretical Branch of the Air Force Weapons Laboratory at Kirtland Air Force Base (1971–1974), working with Gregory Canavan. At Kirtland Brau carried out theoretical studies of laser-target interactions, electromagnetic pulse, and charged particle beams. He served as chief of Kirtland's General Physics Group (1973–1974), and resigned his Air Force commission in 1974 as a captain.

=== Stanford University (1978–1982) ===
Brau was a research associate at the Stanford Linear Accelerator Center (SLAC) (1978–1982) in the hybrid bubble chamber experimental research group. There he was responsible for the hybrid bubble chamber facility's lead glass detector, in collaboration with colleagues from Duke University, Florida State University and the University of Tennessee.

=== University of Tennessee (1982–1988) ===
On the physics faculty at the University of Tennessee from 1982 to 1988, he continued investigations of photo-production of charmed particles and vector mesons at SLAC. He joined the SLD Collaboration, beginning preparations for an experiment at the SLAC Linear Collider. He studied the design of a uranium calorimeter for SLD and in 1985 published an analysis in collaboration with Tony A. Gabriel — the first to show that despite earlier experimental work, compensation cannot be achieved with liquid argon readout. Using Monte Carlo calculations, Brau and Gabriel showed the importance of low energy neutron interactions with the readout medium hydrogen to achieve compensation.

=== University of Oregon (1988 –present) ===
Brau joined the physics faculty at the University of Oregon in 1988, establishing the first Oregon experimental particle physics group to collaborate with Oregon's existing particle theory group. During early years at Oregon, Brau's research continued to be based on the SLAC Linear Collider where he collaborated on the SLD experiment. He led the design, construction and operation of an innovative silicon-tungsten electromagnetic calorimeter luminosity monitor.

During the active period of the Superconducting Supercollider (SSC) Brau joined the GEM detector project. When the SSC was terminated in 1993, he was appointed project manager for the SLD vertex detector upgrade at SLAC, and led the project which produced a 307,000,000 pixel CCD vertex detector for SLD.

The University of Oregon established the Center for High Energy Physics in 1997, with Brau as founding director. Brau's research group participated in the NuTeV experiment at Fermilab and BaBar at PEP-II at SLAC before applying to join the ATLAS experiment at the Large Hadron Collider (LHC) in 2005. According to the University's Oregon News, he headed "the large UO contingent of faculty, postdoctoral researchers and graduate students at the LHC." In 2012 he was a co-author of the 2012 ATLAS Higgs boson discovery paper.

Brau led the Oregon group into the Laser Interferometer Gravitational-Wave Observatory (LIGO) Scientific Collaboration in 1997. He was a co-author of the gravitational wave discovery paper in 2016.

== Advisory panels, committees, and councils (1995–present) ==
Brau served on numerous advisory panels and review committees, such as the National Research Council Committee on Elementary Particle Physics, (1995–1998), and as associate director for physics and detectors for the Linear Collider Collaboration.

Brau chaired the SLAC Scientific Policy Committee (2001–2004), and served on Fermilab's Physics Advisory Committee (2002–2006). He also served on the Deutsches Elektronen-Synchrotron Physics Review Committee (2003–2007).

Brau participated on the Department of Energy High Energy Physics Advisory Panel (HEPAP) (2005–2008, on the National Research Council Board on Physics and Astronomy (2006–2009), and on the HEPAP Particle Physics Project Prioritization Panel (2007–2011).

Brau has served on the International Advisory Board, Physics at the Terascale, Strategic Helmholtz Alliance, Germany, since 2007, and the International Advisory Committee, International Conference on Calorimetry in Particle Physics, since 2013.

Brau co-chaired the organizing committee of the World-wide Study of the Physics and Detectors for Future Linear electron-positron Colliders (2002–2014). He has been a leader in the worldwide collaboration to design and build the International Linear Collider. In December 2016 Brau was named "Associate Director for Physics and Detectors" of the Linear Collider Collaboration, effective January 2017.

== Ph.D. graduates advised ==
- Pitts, K.T. (1 March 1994). Electroweak coupling measurements from polarized Bhabha scattering at the Z^{0} resonance (Thesis). pp. SLAC––446, 10114075. Bibcode:1994PhDT.........4P. doi:10.2172/10114075.
- Hwang, H (August 1994). QCD Test in Three-Jet Z0 Decays at SLD and Detector Development for H0 --> Gamma Gamma Searches in High-Energy Hadron Colliders (Thesis). pp. SLAC–R–689, 826663. doi:10.2172/826663. S2CID 123842272.
- Langston, Matthew D (15 July 2003). A Measurement of the Effective Electron Neutral Current Coupling Parameters from Polarized Bhabha Scattering at the Z0 Resonance (Thesis). pp. SLAC–R–629, 813363. Bibcode:2003PhDT.......104L. doi:10.2172/813363. OSTI 813363.
- Walston, S (22 June 2004). Heavy Flavor Decays of the Z0 and a Search for Flavor Changing Neutral Currents (Thesis). pp. SLAC–R–728, 827017. Bibcode:2004PhDT........67W. doi:10.2172/827017. OSTI 827017.
- Ito, Masahiro (2006). Search for supernova induced gravitational wave bursts with optimal filter technique on LIGO science data (Thesis). ProQuest 305274497.
- Strube, Jan (September 2008). Analysis of radiative decays of charged B mesons to baryonic final states (Thesis). hdl:1794/9022.
- Searcy, Jacob (11 July 2013). Measurement of the Top Quark Pair Production Cross Section in p-p Collisions at √s = 7 TeV in the l + τ Channel with ATLAS (Thesis). hdl:1794/12944.
- Brost, Elizabeth (27 October 2016). Search for the Flavor-Changing Neutral Current in Top Pair Events in sqrt(s) = 8 TeV Proton-Proton Collisions at the Large Hadron Collider Using the ATLAS Detector (Thesis). hdl:1794/20406.
- Wanotayaroj, Chaowaroj (1 May 2017). Search for a Scalar Partner of the Top Quark in the Jets+ETMiss Final State with the ATLAS detector (Thesis). hdl:1794/22275.
- Barkeloo, Jason (24 September 2020). Search for the Flavor-Changing Neutral Current, t->qgamma, in Top Pair Events Using the Atlas Detector (Thesis). hdl:1794/25619.
- Steinhebel, Amanda (13 September 2021). Much Ado About Nothing: Searches for Higgs Boson Decays to Invisible Particles (Ph.D. thesis). University of Oregon. hdl:1794/26657.

== Honors and awards ==
Upon graduation from USAFA, Brau was named the Outstanding Cadet in Physics of the Class of 1969. He was a Hertz Foundation Fellow for the duration of his graduate work at MIT.

In 2000, Brau was elected a Fellow of the American Physical Society, for "contributions to the development of particle detectors, particularly calorimeters and vertex detectors, and for studies of the properties of the Z boson with the SLD".

Brau is a senior member of the Institute of Electrical and Electronics Engineers.

At the University of Oregon in 2006, Brau was named Philip H. Knight Professor of Natural Science, an endowed position funded by Oregon alumnus Philip H. Knight.

In 2009 he was elected a Fellow of the American Association for the Advancement of Science, for "distinguished contributions to the field of elementary particle physics, particularly for developing and applying new technologies to facilitate precision tests of the Standard Model".

In 2011, Brau received the University of Oregon Research Innovation Award. In 2012, he was chosen to deliver the Inaugural Presidential Research Lecture at the University of Oregon.

As a team member of the LIGO discovery team, Brau was a co-recipient of each of the following prizes: 2016 Gruber Cosmology Prize, 2016 Special Breakthrough Prize in Fundamental Physics, 2017 Royal Astronomical Society Group Achievement Award, and the 2017 AAS Bruno Rossi Prize.
