= Grodziński =

Grodziński (masculine), Grodzińska (feminine) is a Polish surname. Notable people with the surname include:

- Avraham Grodzinski, Lithuanian rabbi, Slabodka yeshiva's spiritual supervisor
- Chaim Ozer Grodzinski (1863–1940), Lithuanian rabbi
- Eugeniusz Grodziński (1912–1994), Polish philosopher
- John R. Grodzinski, 21st century author/reviewer, military topics include War of 1812, Canadian Army
- Teresa Grodzińska (1899–1920), Polish military nurse
- Zvi Hirsch Grodzinski (1850s – 1947), Belarus-born American Orthodox rabbi

== See also ==
- Grodzinski Bakery, a chain of kosher bakeries in London and Toronto
