= The Persistence of Memory (novel) =

2004 novel

- First edition cover
- Author: Tony Eprile
- Language: English
- Genre: Novel, history
- Publisher: W. W. Norton & Company
- Publication date: June 2004
- Publication place: United States
- Media type: Print (hardcover)
- Pages: 288 pp (first edition, hardcover)
- ISBN: 978-0-393-05888-8 (first edition, hardcover)
- OCLC: 55671200
- Dewey Decimal: 823/.914 22
- LC Class: PR9369.3.E67 P47 2004

The Persistence of Memory is a novel by Tony Eprile. It was published in 2004 by W. W. Norton & Company.

== Plot summary ==
The story portrays 1970s and 1980s South Africa through the experiences of Paul Sweetbread, a young Jewish South African with a photographic memory. The novel follows Paul coming of age in Johannesburg's Jewish northern suburbs, from his experiences in school, through his service in the South African Defence Force during the country's border war. It culminates with his participation in the Truth and Reconciliation Commission in 1996. The novel deals heavily with the question of white liberal guilt during the apartheid regime.

== Reception ==
The New York Times described the book as "a fascinating picture of white South Africa, an anatomy of the liberal conscience -- both sympathetic and scathing -- that resonates far beyond its immediate setting".

Anderson Tepper, writing in The Forward, speculated that the novel "just might prove to be the [South African] Jewish community’s masterpiece."

=== Awards ===
The Persistence of Memory won the 2005 Koret Jewish Book Award for fiction, beating out The Plot Against America by Philip Roth.
