= Katharine Cashman =

American volcanologist (born 1954)

Katharine Cashman FRS MAE
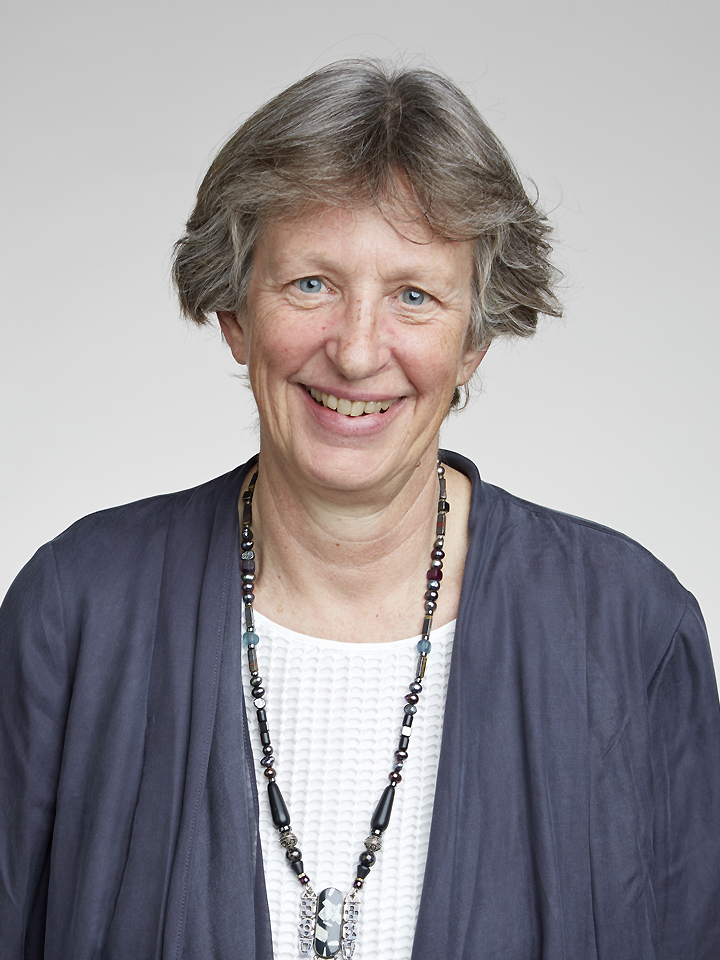
- Cashman in 2016
- Born: Katharine Venable Cashman; 19 July 1954 (age 72); Providence, Rhode Island
- Education: Middlebury College; Victoria University of Wellington (MSci); Johns Hopkins University (PhD)
- Awards: Royal Society Wolfson Research Merit Award
- Scientific career
- Fields: Volcanology
- Workplaces: University of Bristol; University of Oregon; Princeton University
- Thesis: Crystal size distribution in igneous and metamorphic rocks (1987)
- Doctoral advisor: Bruce Marsh
- Doctoral students: Julia Hammer
- Website: pages.uoregon.edu/cashman; www.bristol.ac.uk/earthsciences/people/katharine-v-cashman

Katharine Venable Cashman FRS MAE (born 19 July 1954) is an American volcanologist, professor of volcanology at the University of Bristol and former Philip H. Knight Professor of Natural Science at the University of Oregon.

== Education ==
Cashman was educated at Middlebury College, Vermont where she was awarded a Bachelor of Arts degree in Geology and Biology in 1976. She continued her studies at Victoria University of Wellington in New Zealand and then completed her PhD at Johns Hopkins University, Maryland, in 1986. Her PhD research applied theories of crystal size distributions to volcanic systems, and was supervised by Bruce Marsh.

== Career and research ==
She was an assistant professor at Princeton University from 1986 to 1991, and then an associate professor (1991–1997) and full professor (1997–present) at the University of Oregon. She moved to the University of Bristol in 2011 on a research professorship funded by the AXA insurance.

Cashman studies links between chemical and physical factors that control magma ascent, eruption, and emplacement on the Earth's surface. She has studied volcanoes on all seven continents and explored a wide range of eruption styles. She is best known for her work that links the kinetics of bubble and crystal formation to the behaviour of volcanic materials, but has worked on problems that span from the chemical to physical to social aspects of volcanism. She has worked with all the US volcano observatories and served on the scientific advisory committee for the island of Montserrat.

Her research uses a combination of volcanology, igneous petrology, kinetics, microscopy and fluid dynamics with a focus on mafic volcanoes. This includes channel development in Hawaiian lava flows and volcanic ash formation in eruptions. She also has interests in intermediate composition and silicic volcanoes, particularly at Mount St. Helens.

=== Awards and honours ===
Cashman was elected to the National Academy of Sciences in 2016. She was also elected a Fellow of the Royal Society (FRS) in 2016. As of 2016 she holds a Royal Society Wolfson Research Merit Award. She is a Fellow of the American Geophysical Union and the American Academy of Arts and Sciences, and is a member of the Academia Europaea. She is a member of the International Association of Volcanology and Chemistry of the Earth's Interior (IACVEI).

In 2020 she was awarded the Murchison Medal by the Geological Society of London.
