= Tony Eprile =

South African and American writer (born 1955)

- Born: 1955 (age 70–71); Johannesburg, South Africa
- Education: Connecticut College; Brown University
- Occupation: Novelist
- Writing career
- Genres: Drama, fiction, short stories
- Notable awards: Koret Jewish Book Award (2005)

Tony Eprile is a South African and American writer. His 2004 novel, The Persistence of Memory, won the Koret Jewish Book Award in 2005, beating out The Plot Against America by Philip Roth.

== Early life ==
Tony Eprile was born in Hillbrow, Johannesburg, South Africa in 1955 to Jewish parents. His mother, Liesel Weil was a from a well-to-do German Jewish family in Frankfurt that were adherents of Liberal Judaism. Amid the rise of the Nazi Party in Germany, she emigrated to South Africa in 1936 at the age of seventeen. Eprile's father, Cecil Eprile, a Scottish Jew, also arrived in South Africa in 1936. Cecil was the editor of the Golden City Post, a liberal newspaper catering to a black South African readership and advocating for the end of apartheid.

In the late 1960s, he emigrated to England with his parents and brother when he was 12 years-old. The family then emigrated to the United States between 1970 and 1972 At the age of 17, Eprile then a recent arrival in the United States, took a writing class at college. He produced a South African-themed short story titled, "Cough’s Tokoloshe", with the tokoloshe employed as a metaphor for white fears. Year later, he gave a copy of the story to a visiting poet, Robert Hayden. Hayden invited him to talk to him about the story, and they became friends, with Hayden acting as an important mentor to Eprile.

He attended Connecticut College, graduating with a BA in anthropology. He later graduated with an MA in Creative Writing from Brown University.

== Career ==
Eprile is the author of the 1989 book Temporary Sojourner and Other South African Stories, which was a New York Times Notable Book of the Year.

His 2004 book The Persistence of Memory won the Koret Jewish Book Award. Anderson Tepper, writing in The Forward, speculated that the novel "just might prove to be the [South African] Jewish community’s masterpiece." The novel was also a New York Times Notable Book of the Year. It was also listed as a best book of 2004 by The Washington Post and the Los Angeles Times.

He has taught at Northwestern University, Williams College, Bennington College, Lesley University, and the Iowa Writers' Workshop.

He has also published guest columns, book reviews, literary criticism and interviews with writers for titles such as The New York Times, The Nation, The Washington Post, Tablet and The Johannesburg Review of Books. He acts as an Editorial Advisory Panel member for The Johannesburg Review of Books with Antjie Krog and Lauren Beukes, among others.

== Personal life ==
Eprile lives in Vermont in the United States with his wife, Judith D. Schwartz, whom he married in 1989 shortly after the publication of Temporary Sojourner. Schwartz is a widely published environmental journalist, and has written six books.

== Books ==
Short stories

- Temporary Sojourner and Other South African Stories (1989)

Novels

- The Persistence of Memory (2004)
