= Julia Hammer =

American vulcanologist and petrologist

Julia Eve Hammer
- Occupations: Volcanologist; petrologist; professor
- Employer: University of Hawaiʻi at Mānoa
- Known for: Research on magma transformation and igneous rock formation

Julia Eve Hammer is an American volcanologist and petrologist who studies the transformation of magma, through upwelling, mixing, and volcanic processes, into igneous rock. She is a professor of earth sciences at the University of Hawaiʻi at Mānoa.

== Education and career ==
Hammer was an undergraduate at Dartmouth College, where she graduated in 1993 with a bachelor's thesis on the formation of Himalayan leucogranite, supervised by C. Page Chamberlain. She continued her studies at the University of Oregon, where she completed her Ph.D. in 1998. Her doctoral dissertation was Magma vesiculation, degassing, and crystallization: Case studies and results from analog experiments, with Katharine Cashman as her doctoral advisor.

She became an NSF Postdoctoral Fellow and researcher at Brown University from 1999 until 2002, when she joined the University of Hawaiʻi as an assistant professor. She was promoted to associate professor in 2006 and full professor in 2013.

== Recognition ==
Hammer was a 2005 recipient of the Presidential Early Career Award for Scientists and Engineers, given "for working at the forefront of a new field that uses data derived from experiments and theory to understand how volcanoes behave during eruptions". In 2018 she was named as a Fellow of the Geological Society of America.
