= Symeon C. Symeonides =

American lawyer

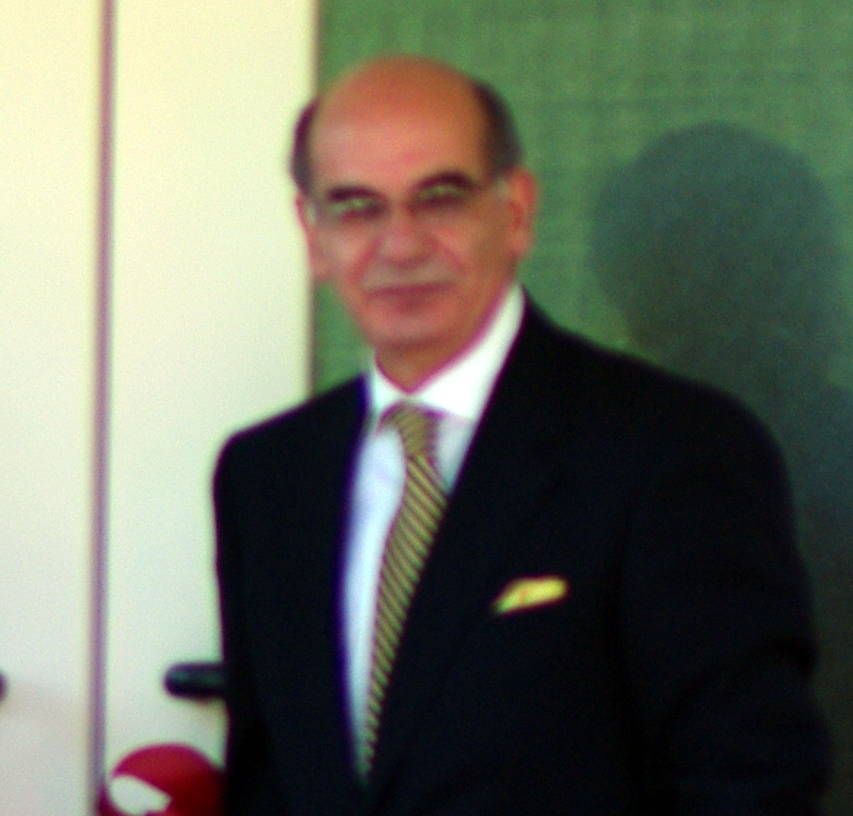
- Symeonides in 2008

Dean of Willamette Law School
- In office July 1999 – May 2011
- Preceded by: Robert M. Ackerman
- Succeeded by: Peter Letsou

Personal details
- Born: 1949 (age 76–77) Lythrodontas, Cyprus
- Spouse: Haroula Symeonides
- Education: Aristotelian University of Thessaloniki; Harvard Law School
- Profession: professor of law
- Website: Website

Symeon C. Symeonides (born 1949), Alex L. Parks Distinguished Professor of Law, Dean Emeritus, is an international law scholar and professor at the Willamette University College of Law in Salem, Oregon, United States. The Cyprus-born legal scholar is also President of the American Society of Comparative Law and former dean at Willamette. A graduate of Harvard Law School, he previously taught at Louisiana State University's Paul M. Hebert Law Center.

== Early years and education ==
Symeonides was born in Lythrodontas, Cyprus, in 1949. He then attended Aristotelian University of Thessaloniki, Greece, where he studied law. In 1972 he graduated first in his class with the highest grade point average in the history of the school. He earned his degree in private law. The next year he received a degree in public law, graduating summa cum laude. Symeonides then moved to the United States and attended Harvard Law School where he earned two degrees. He received an LL.M. in 1974 and a SJD in 1980. He is married to Haroula Symeonides.

== Legal career ==
While still finishing his legal education at Harvard Law, Symeon Symeonides began working as an assistant professor and then associate professor at Louisiana State University Law Center. In 1989, he became the Judge Albert Tate Professor of Law at LSU, teaching there until 1999. While a professor he served as U.S. National Reporter to the International Congress of Comparative Law in 1994, and as Rapporteur Général in 1998. During his time at LSU he also served as a vice chancellor. Symeonides has also taught at Tulane University, Loyola University New Orleans, and his alma mater in Greece.

In March 1999, Symeon C. Symeonides was hired as the dean at Willamette University’s law school located in Salem, Oregon, and served in the position from July 1999–February 2011. He is the Alex L. Parks Distinguished Professor of Law, Dean Emeritus. In 2002, he gave the lecture for private international law at the annual meeting of The Hague Academy of International Law. Held at the Peace Palace in The Hague, Netherlands, he was the 18th American selected for the honor in the 78 years of the conference. In Europe he has taught at Universite Paris V and Louvain-1a-Neuve.

Other legal work has included law reform for the Oregon Law Commission, Louisiana State Law Institute, and Puerto Rican Academy of Legislation and Jurisprudence. In 2006, he became president of the American Society of Comparative Law, an organization where he had previously served as secretary. Symeonides is also a member of the American Law Institute, Bartolus Society, and Order of the Coif. He has served as president of the Association of American Law Schools section on conflict of laws and as a member of the board of editors to the American Journal of Comparative Law.

Symeonides resigned as dean at Willamette in February 2011, effective at the end of the academic year and was succeeded by Peter Letsou.

== Published works ==
- Cases and Materials on Conflict of Laws: American, Comparative and International. 2nd Edition, West Group 2003.
- Conflict of Laws. 4th Edition, West Group 2004.
- Law and Justices in a Multistate World: Essays in Honor of Arthur T. von Mehren. Transnational Publishers 2002: editor.
- Private International law at the End of the 20th Century: Progress or Regress?. Kluwer Law International 1998: editor.

Academic offices
Preceded by Robert M. Ackerman	Dean of Willamette University College of Law; 1999–2011	Succeeded by Peter Letsou
