= Philip H. Knight Chairs and Professorships =

Endowed chairs and professorships

Philip H. Knight endowed chairs and professorships were established at the University of Oregon in 1996, when Penny and Phil Knight donated US$15 million for 27 endowed chairs and professorships, "to provide academic areas with a source of funds for recruiting and retaining faculty of superior academic quality". Chairs and professorships must be awarded on merit only, not longevity. Collectively, the Knight endowed chairs and professorships receive over US$325,000 in bonuses per year. The award for a Knight Chair is US$50,000, and US$25,000 for a Knight Professorship.

Phil and Penny Knight donated an endowment fund of US$5 million to the Stanford University Graduate School of Business in 2006.

In 2009, the Knights donated US$5 million to Willamette University for a School of Law endowed chair named for Alex L. Parks, Penny Knight's father, who served on the faculty of the School of Law.

== Stanford University ==
- Adam Johnson, Phil and Penny Knight Professor in Creative Writing
- Robert L. Joss, Philip H. Knight Professor and Dean Emeritus of the Graduate School of Business
- Richard Powers, Phil and Penny Knight Professor of Creative Writing
- A. Michael Spence, Philip H. Knight Professor Emeritus

== University of Oregon ==
- Judith R. Baskin, Philip H. Knight Professor of Humanities
- Bruce Blonigen, Philip H. Knight Professor of Social Science
- James E. Brau, Philip H. Knight Professor of Natural Science
- G.Z. "Charlie" Brown, Philip H. Knight Professor Emeritus of Architecture
- Michael Bullis, Somerville Knight Professor, College of Education
- Jon M. Erlandson, Philip H. Knight Professor of Social Sciences
- Phil A. Fisher, Philip H. Knight Chair in Psychology
- Warren Ginsberg, Philip H. Knight Professor of Humanities
- Kenneth Helphand, Philip H. Knight Professor of Architecture and Allied Arts
- Dennis R. Howard, Philip H. Knight Professor of Business, Professor Emeritus of Marketing
- David W. Hulse, Philip H. Knight Professor of Landscape Architecture
- Jeffrey M. Hurwit, Philip H. Knight Professor of Art History and Classics
- Mark L. Johnson, Philip H. Knight Professor of Liberal Arts and Sciences
- Edward Kame'enui, Knight Professor Emeritus of Education
- Sergio Koreisha Philip H. Knight Professor of Business
- Robert Kyr, Philip H. Knight Professor of Composition and Theory
- Adriene Lim, Dean and Philip H. Knight Chair, UO Libraries
- Michael Moffitt, Philip H. Knight Chair in Law
- James C. Mohr, Philip H. Knight Professor of Social Sciences
- Steve Owen, Philip H. Knight Professor of Jazz Studies and Music Theory
- Ellen Peters, Philip H. Knight Chair in Science Communication
- Michael G. Raymer, Philip H. Knight Professor of Liberal Arts and Sciences
- Lucas C. R. Silva, Philip H. Knight Professor of Natural Sciences
- Tom H. Stevens, Philip H. Knight professorship in the Department of Chemistry and Biochemistry
- Jeffrey Stolet, Philip H. Knight Professor of Intermedia Music Technology
- Daniel Tichenor, Philip H. Knight Professor of Social Science
- Gerald Tindal, Castle-McIntosh-Knight Professor of Education
- Merle H. Weiner, Philip H. Knight Professor of Law
- Mary Christina Wood, Philip H. Knight Professor of Law

== Previous University of Oregon Knight chairs and professors ==
- Keith Aoki, former Philip H. Knight Professor of Law
- Deborah A. Carver, former Philip H. Knight Dean of Libraries
- Katharine Cashman, former Philip H. Knight Professor of Natural Science
- Charles Dowd, former Philip H. Knight Professor of Music
- Geraldine Richmond, former Philip H. Knight Professor of Liberal Arts and Sciences
- George W. Shipman, former Philip H. Knight University Librarian
- Rennard Strickland, Philip H. Knight Professor Emeritus of Law
- Janet Wasco, Knight Chair in Communication Research

== Willamette University ==
Symeon C. Symeonides, Alex L. Parks Distinguished Chair and Dean Emeritus of the College of Law
