= Case & Draper =

Photography studio in Alaska, United States

Case & Draper was a photographic studio partnership in Skagway, Alaska, between William Howard Case and Horace H. Draper. Their work included photographs of the Tlingit, portraits, scenery, and gold rush era images. Digital collections of their work are available at the Orbis Cascade Alliance and the Alaska State Library, which has images of their photographic tent as well as their dog team and sled in front of their store. From 1907 to 1914, the studio was known as Draper and Co.

== History ==
Case arrived in Skagway in 1898 and established the partnership with Draper the same year. The photographers established their business in a photographic tent, allowing them to travel and take photographs. "Documenting the unknown" made them popular and they eventually moved into a storefront and sold curios, photographic equipment, and souvenirs, along with their work. They received a contract from White Pass and Yukon Route to photograph the scenery along the railway route in 1901. They opened a branch studio in Juneau in 1905.

The partnership between Case and Draper dissolved in 1907 and Case moved to Juneau where he opened his own photography studio. He lived there until his death in 1920. Draper remained with the original business in Skagway, continuing under the name Draper and Co. until about 1914.

Many of Case and Draper's photographs of local Tlingit women were staged and sexualized, meant for sale to miners.

== Draper ==
Herbert Horace Draper was born on July 5, 1855, in Rockford, Illinois. His family moved from Michigan to Oregon when he was 19. Draper worked as a commercial agent in Bellingham, Washington, and Astoria, Oregon, until the 1898 Gold Rush brought him to Skagway. He married a local school teacher named Harriet. He died in 1913 and area businesses closed for a day to mourn his passing. The studio was acquired by the Keller Brothers Drug Company.

== Case ==
William Howard Case was born on April 19, 1868, in Marshalltown, Iowa. He lived in South Dakota and Oregon until venturing to the Klondike during the 1898 Gold Rush. He had claims in Atlin. Case had three children: Howard, Alice, and Madge. His daughter Madge married Hugh Wade (Secretary of the Territory of Alaska from 1959 to 1966). Case was a member of the Masons and a Shriner. He died July 16, 1920. His studio was taken over by E. C. Adams.

== Gallery ==
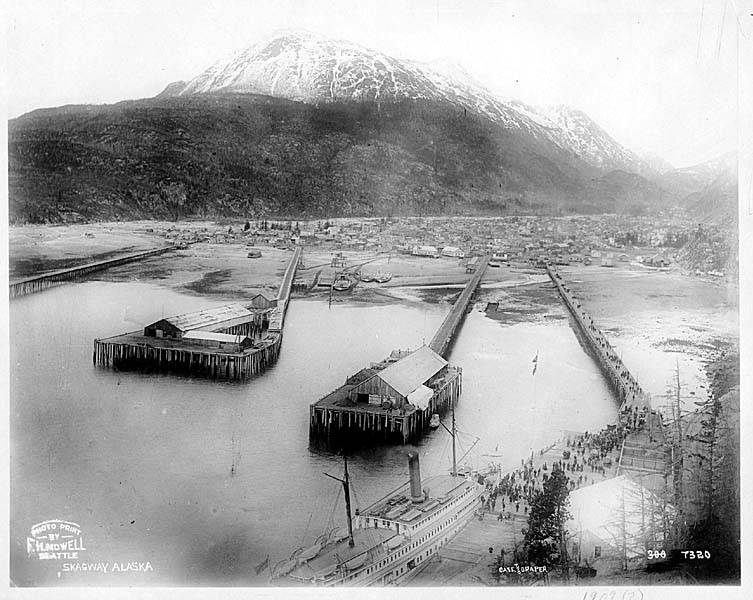
Skagway wharves and steamship unloading

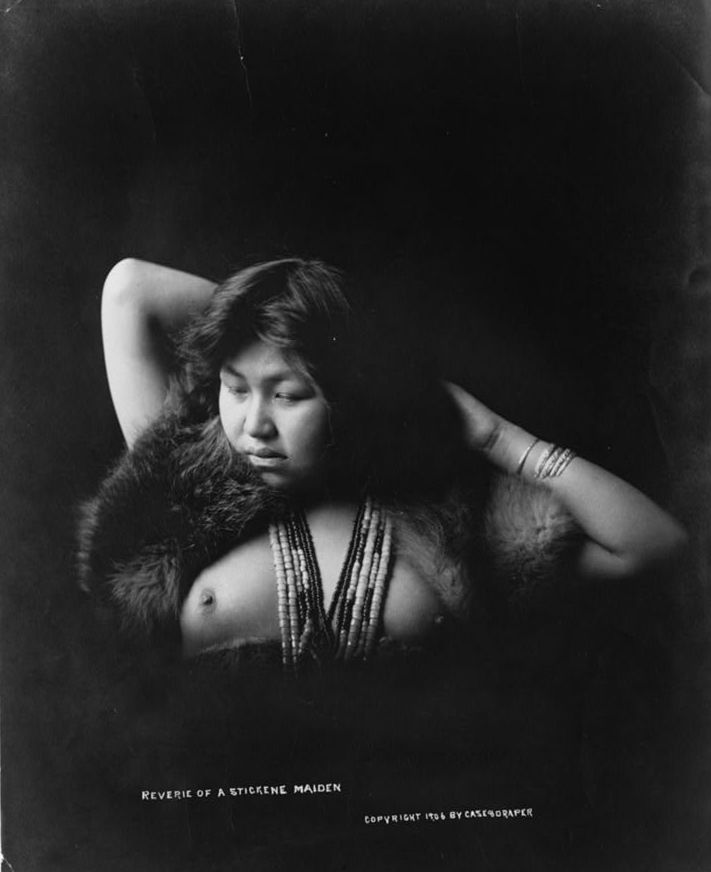
Reverie of a Stickene maiden

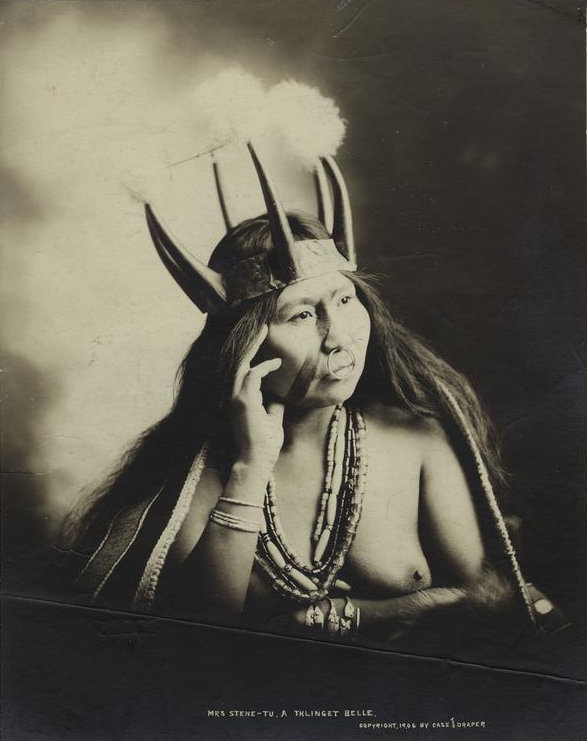
Tu a Thlinget belle

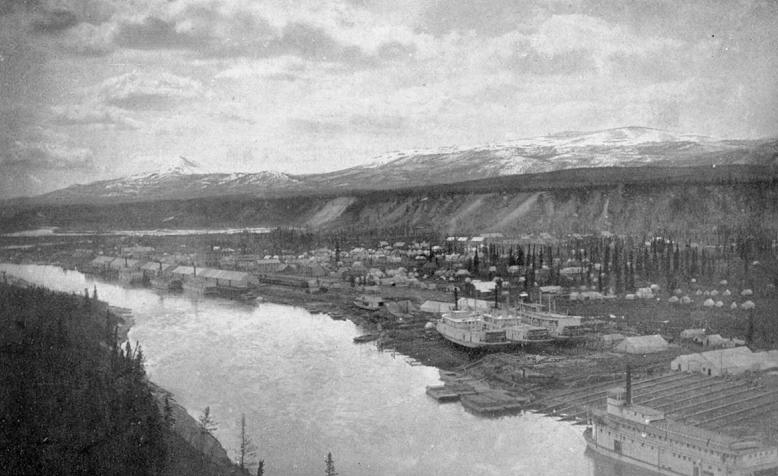
White Horse, Yukon Territory

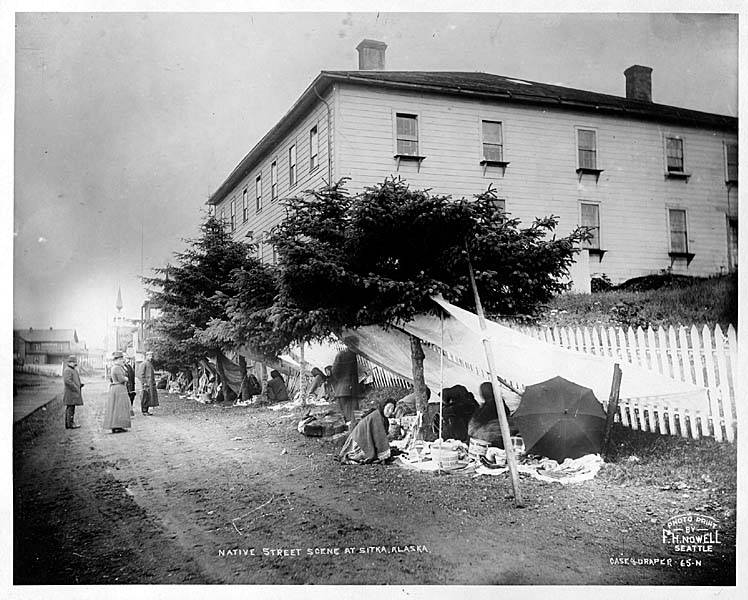
Native women selling wares under cloth shelters on Lincoln Street in Sitka

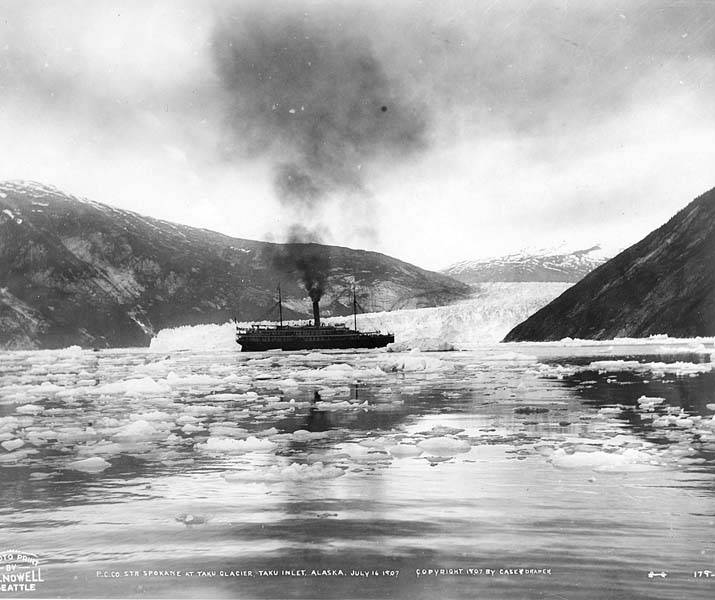
Taku Glacier, Taku Inlet, Alaska

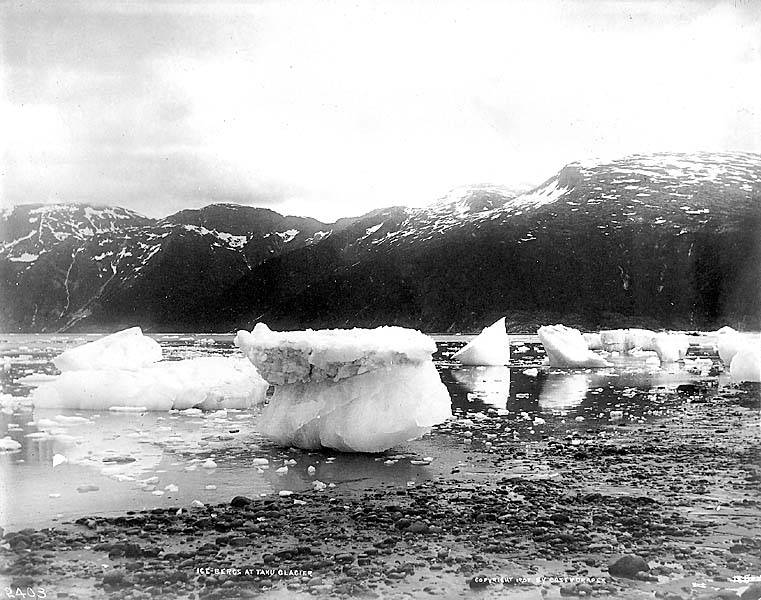
Icebergs at Taku glacier terminus

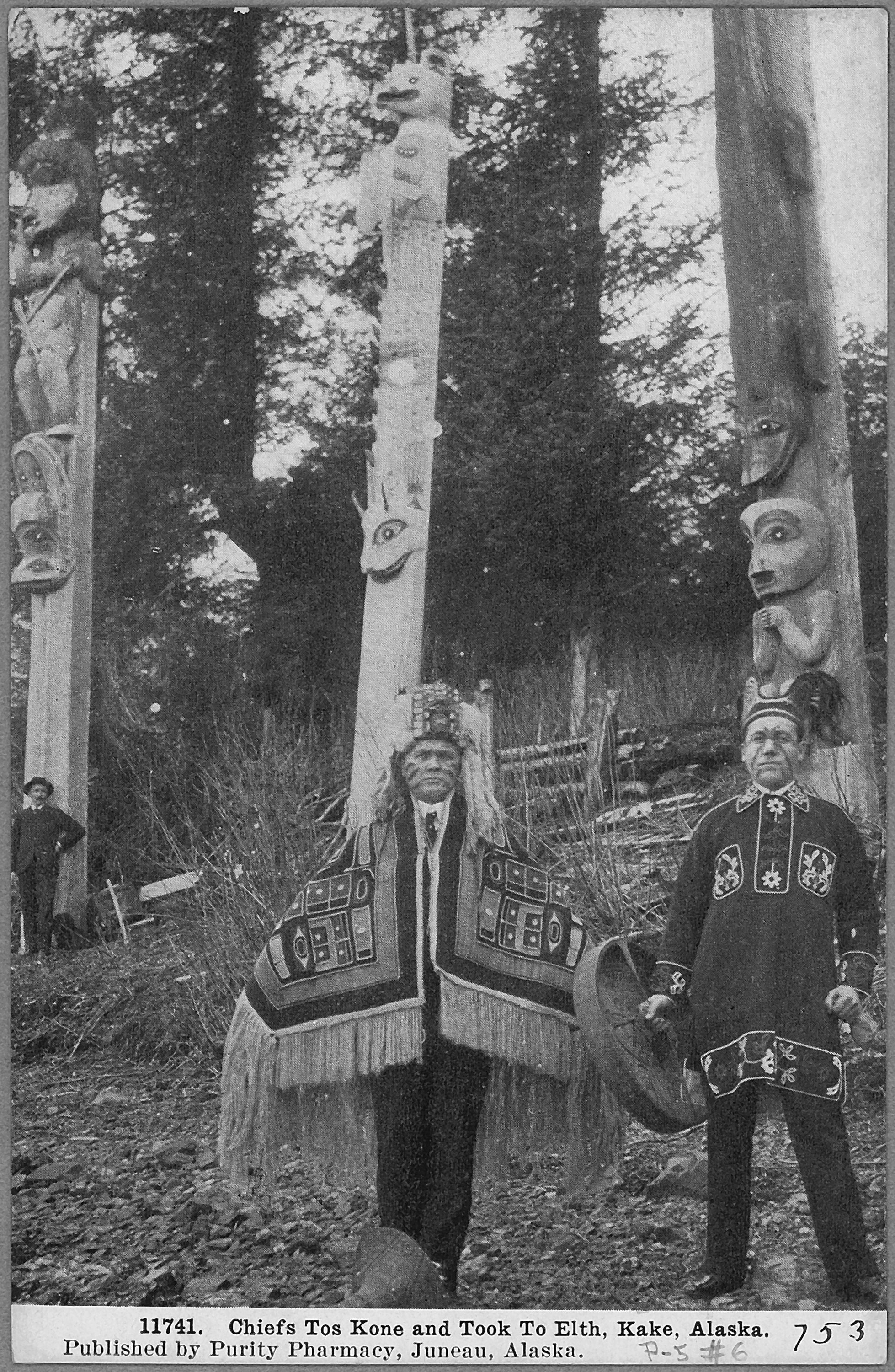
Chief Tos Kine and Chief Took to Elth, Kake, Alaska

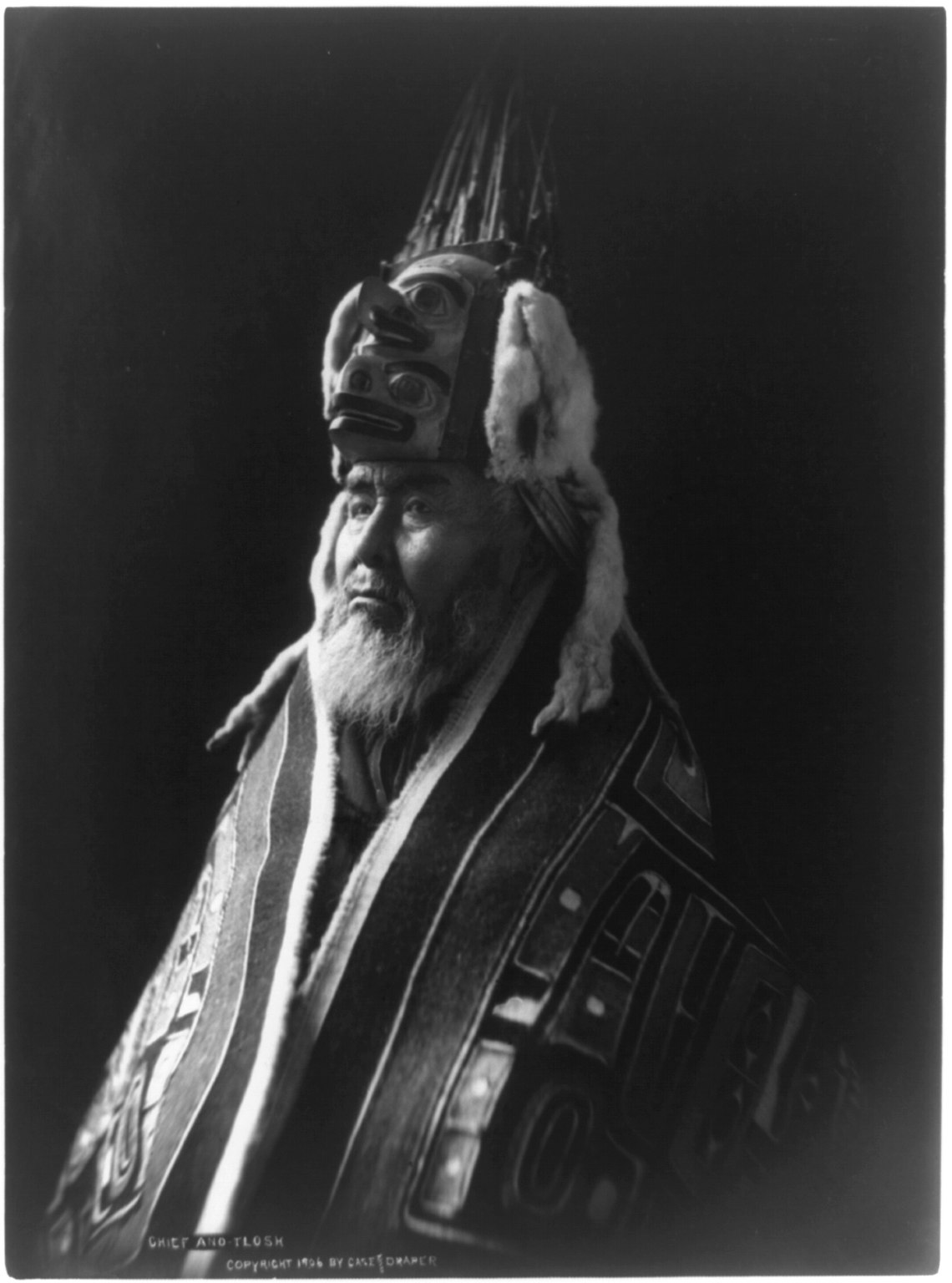

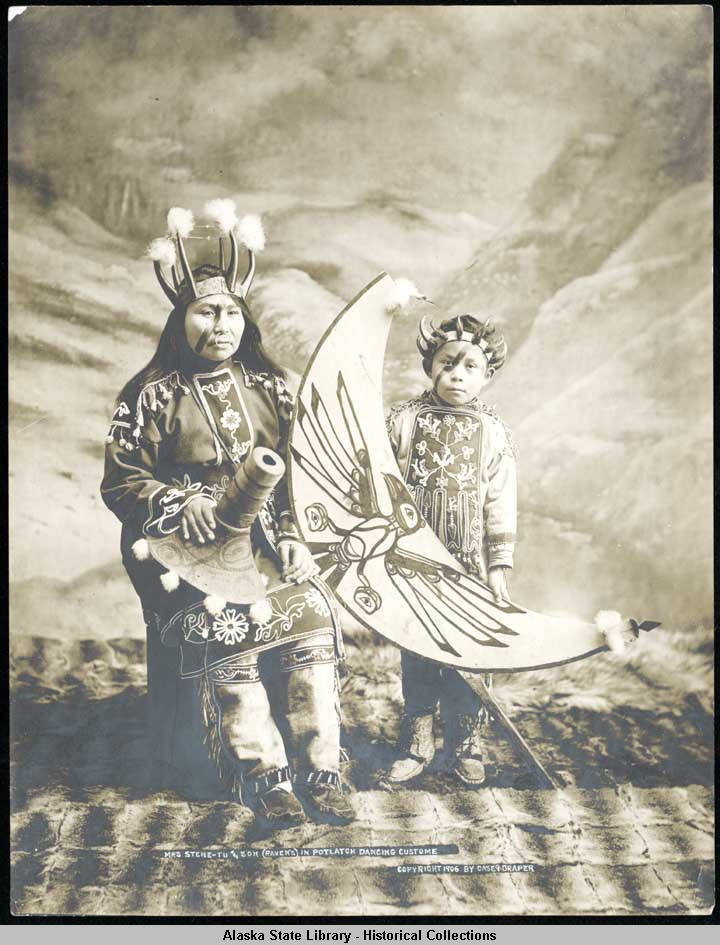

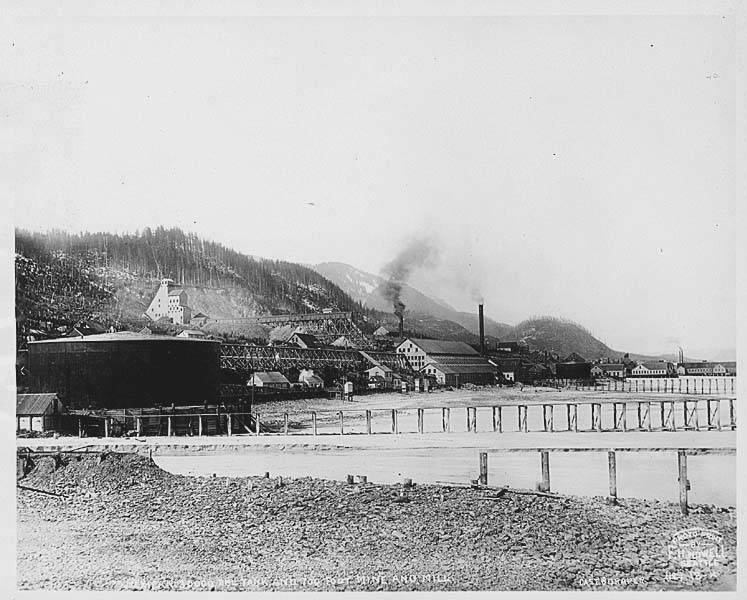

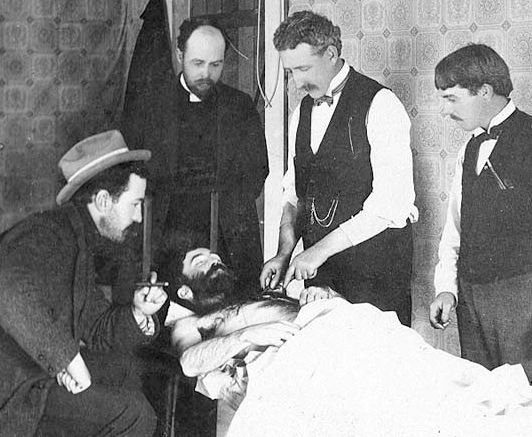
Death of Soapy Smith

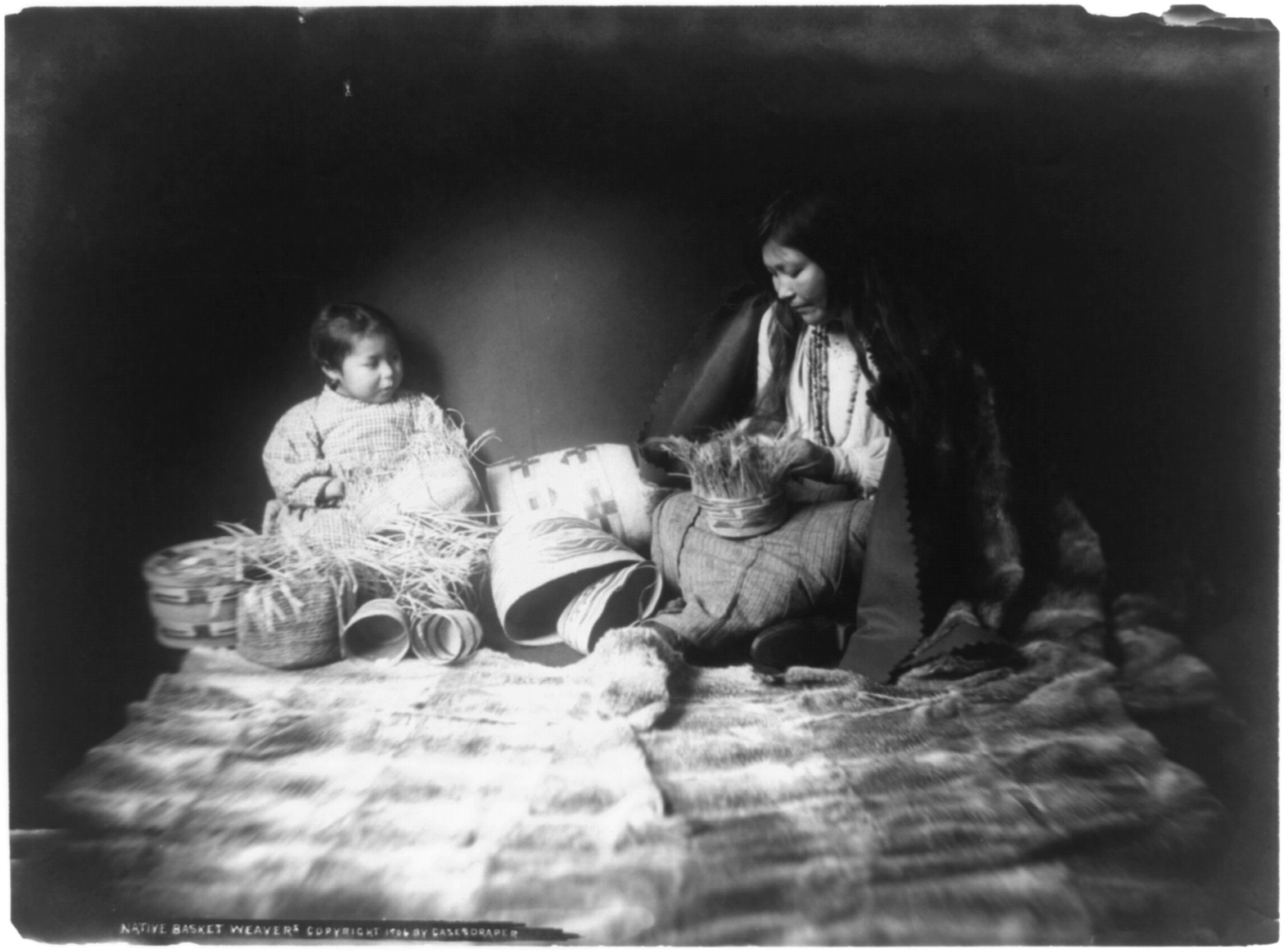

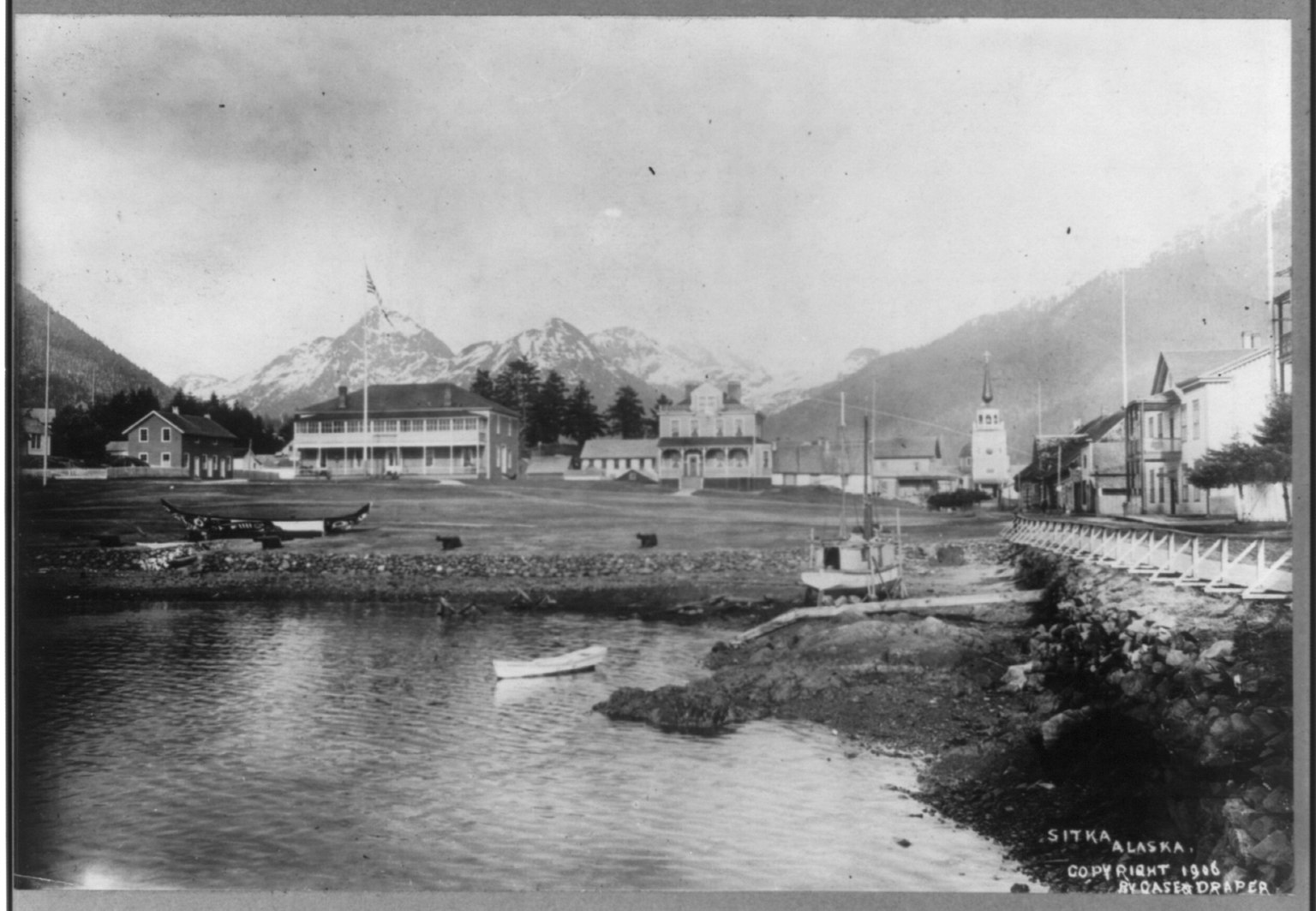
Sitka, Alaska

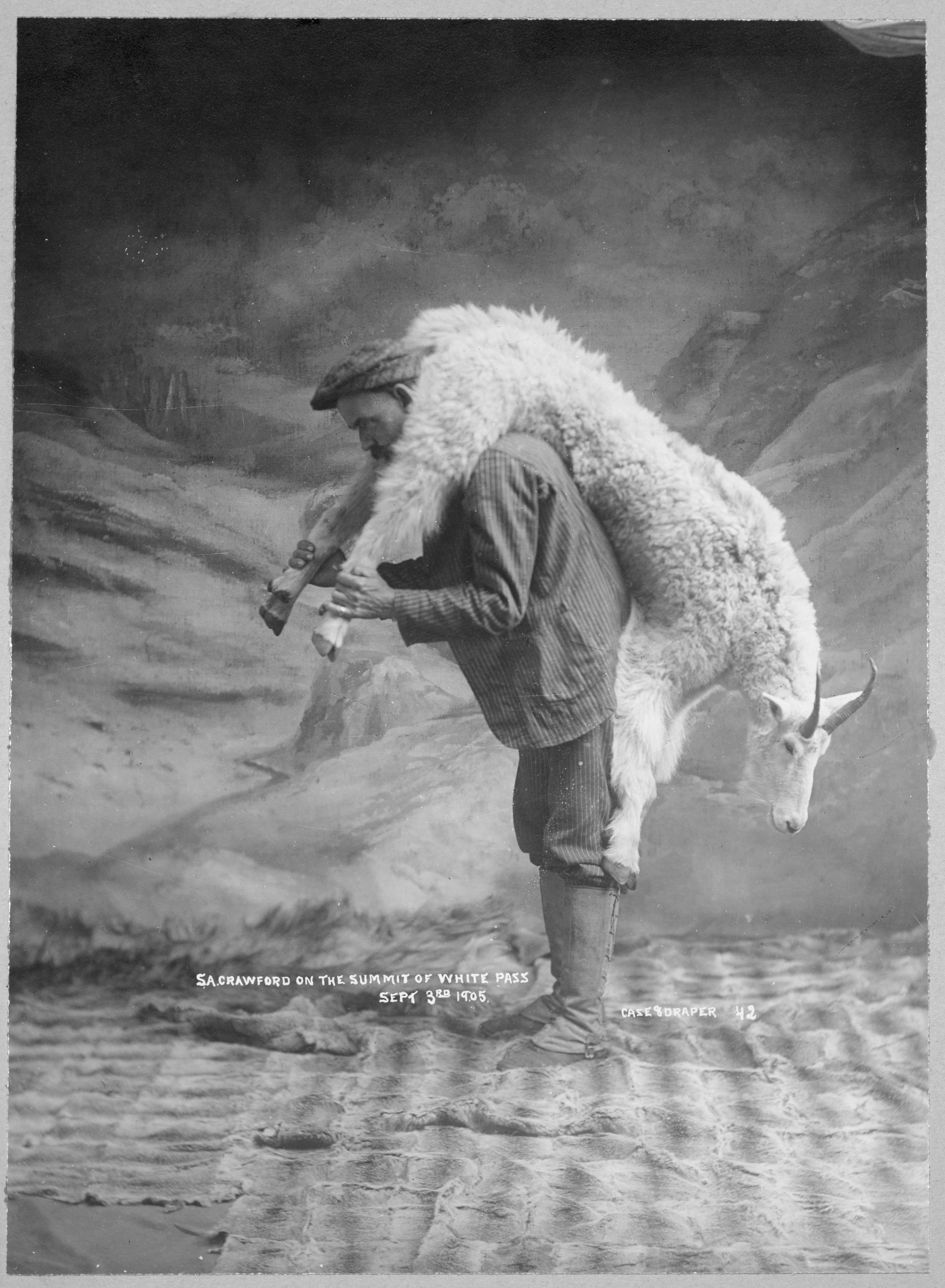

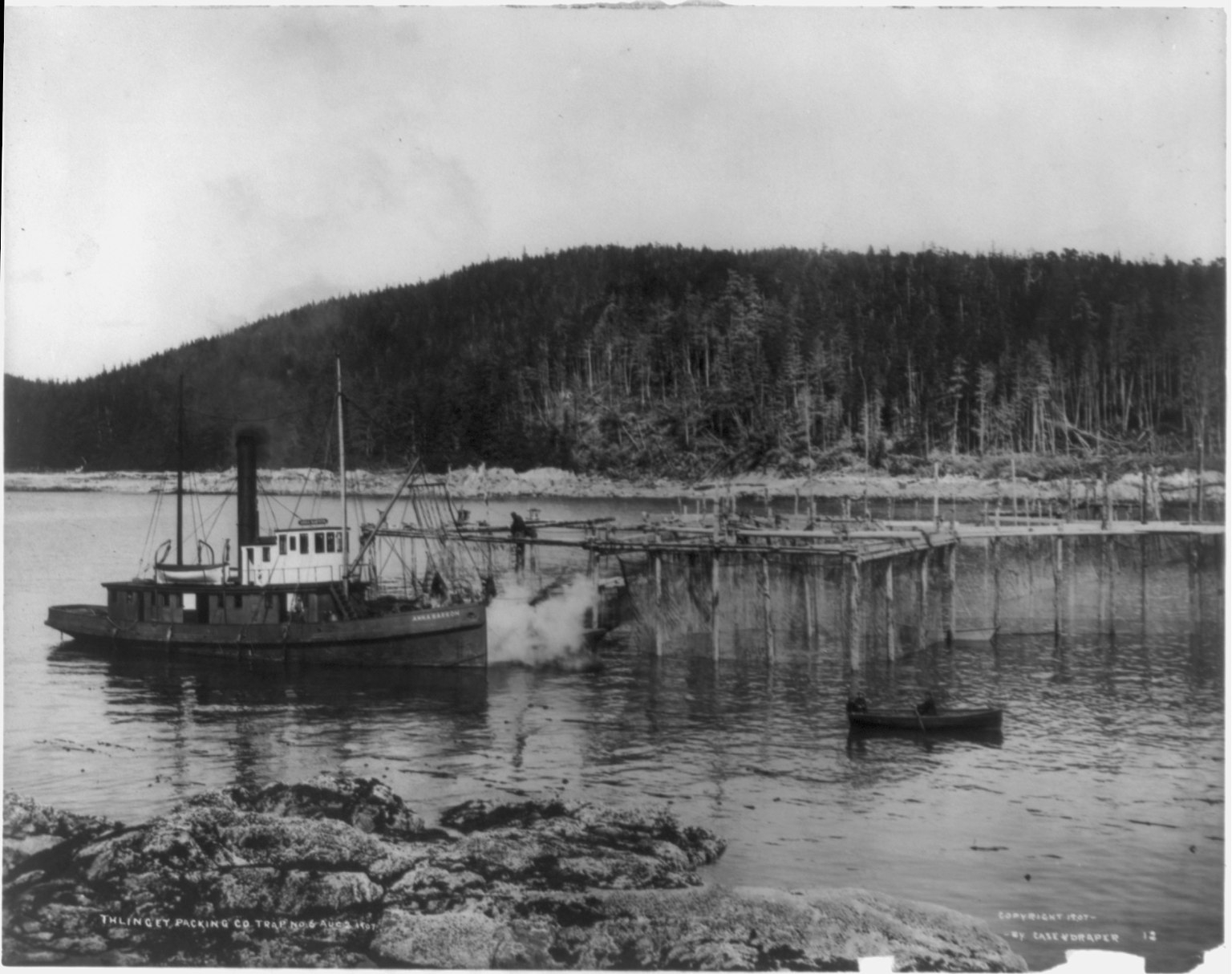
Thlinget Packing Co. trap

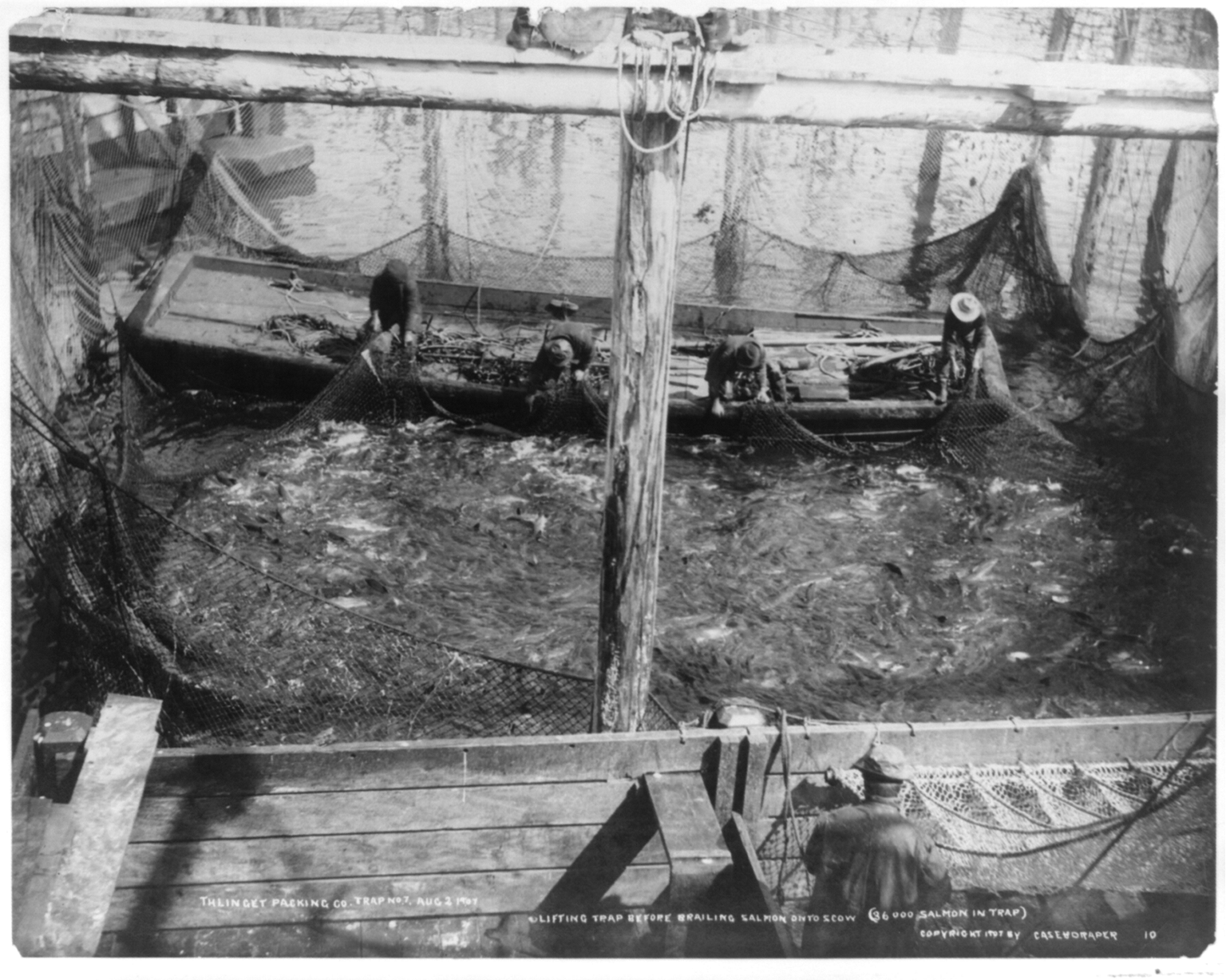

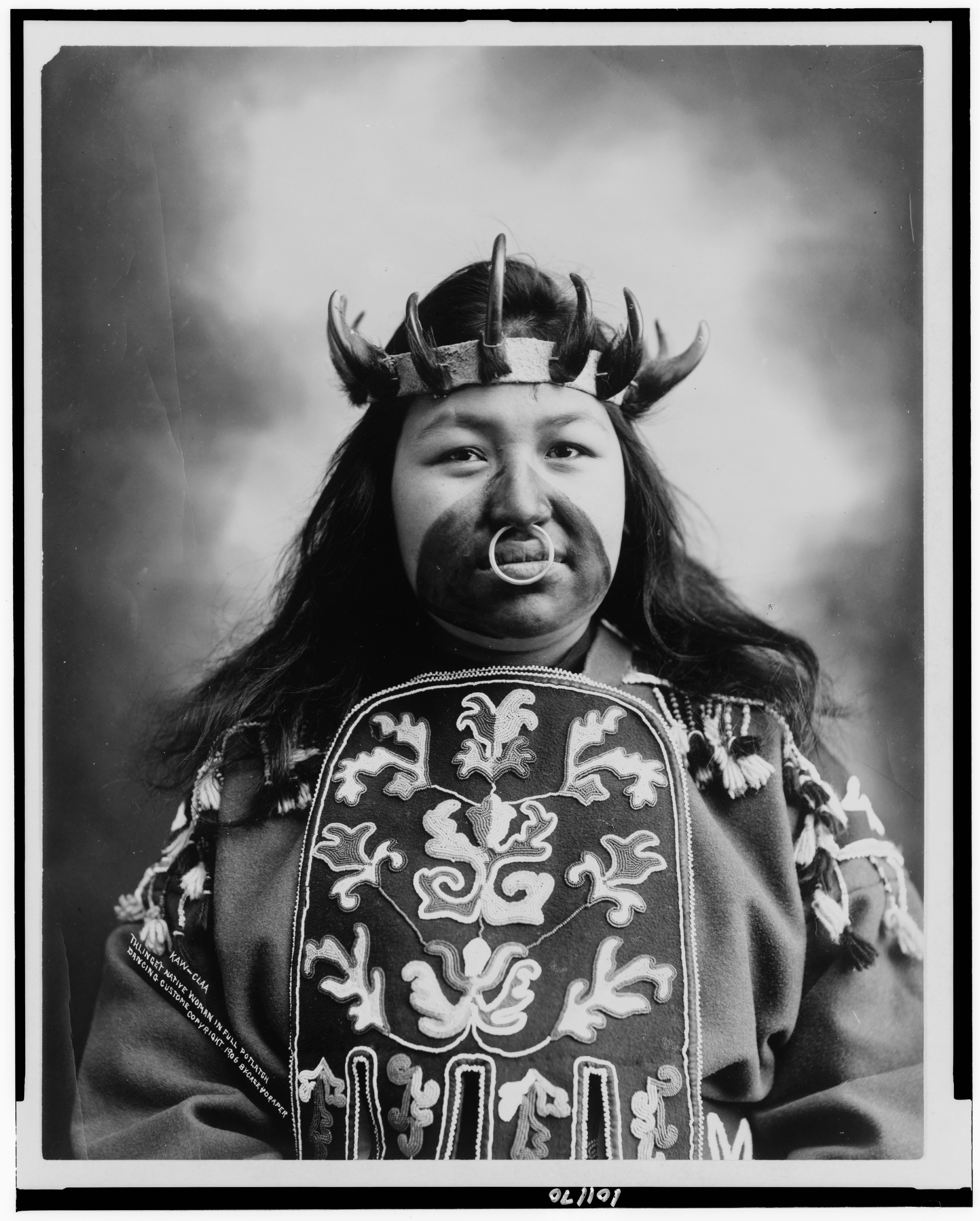

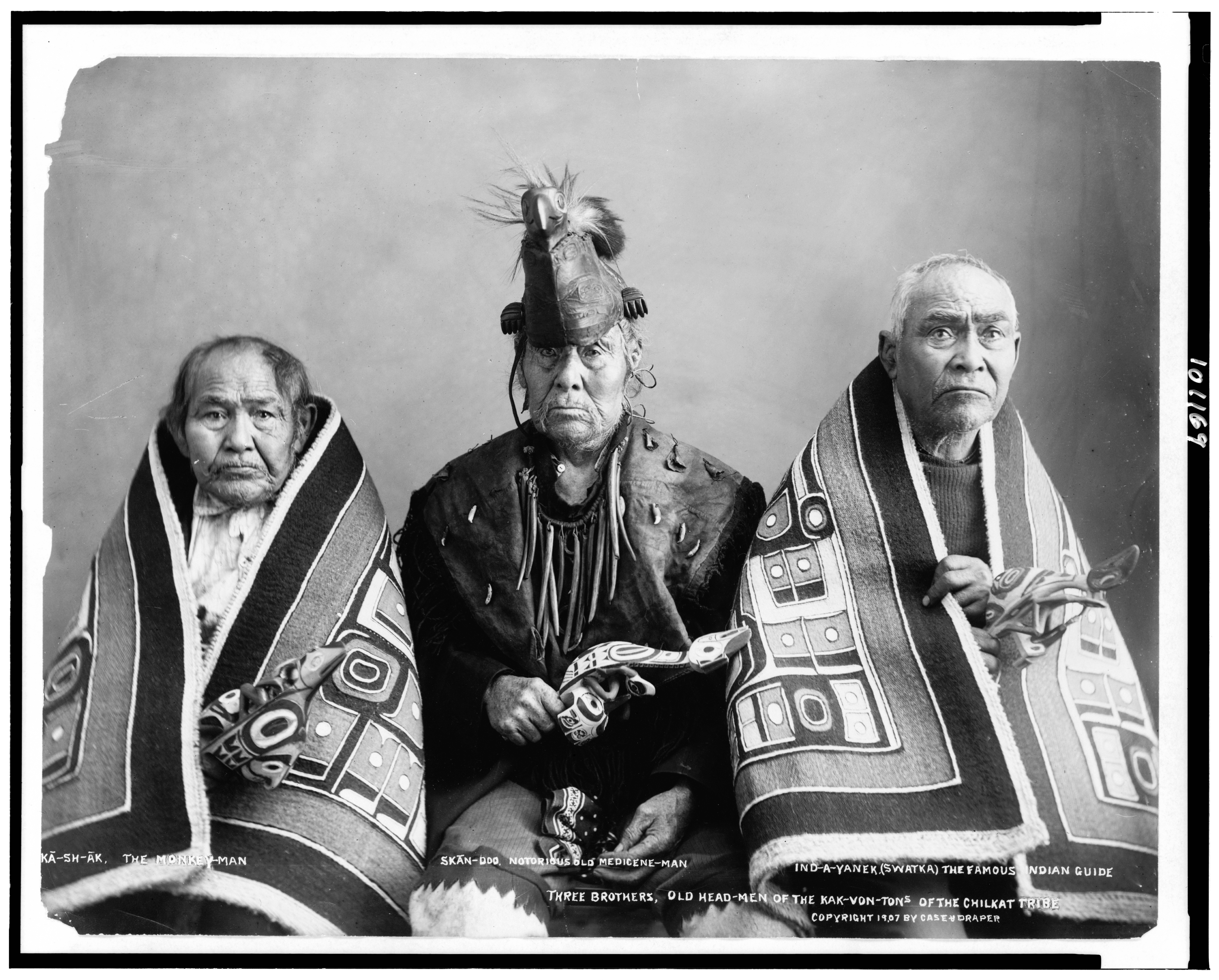

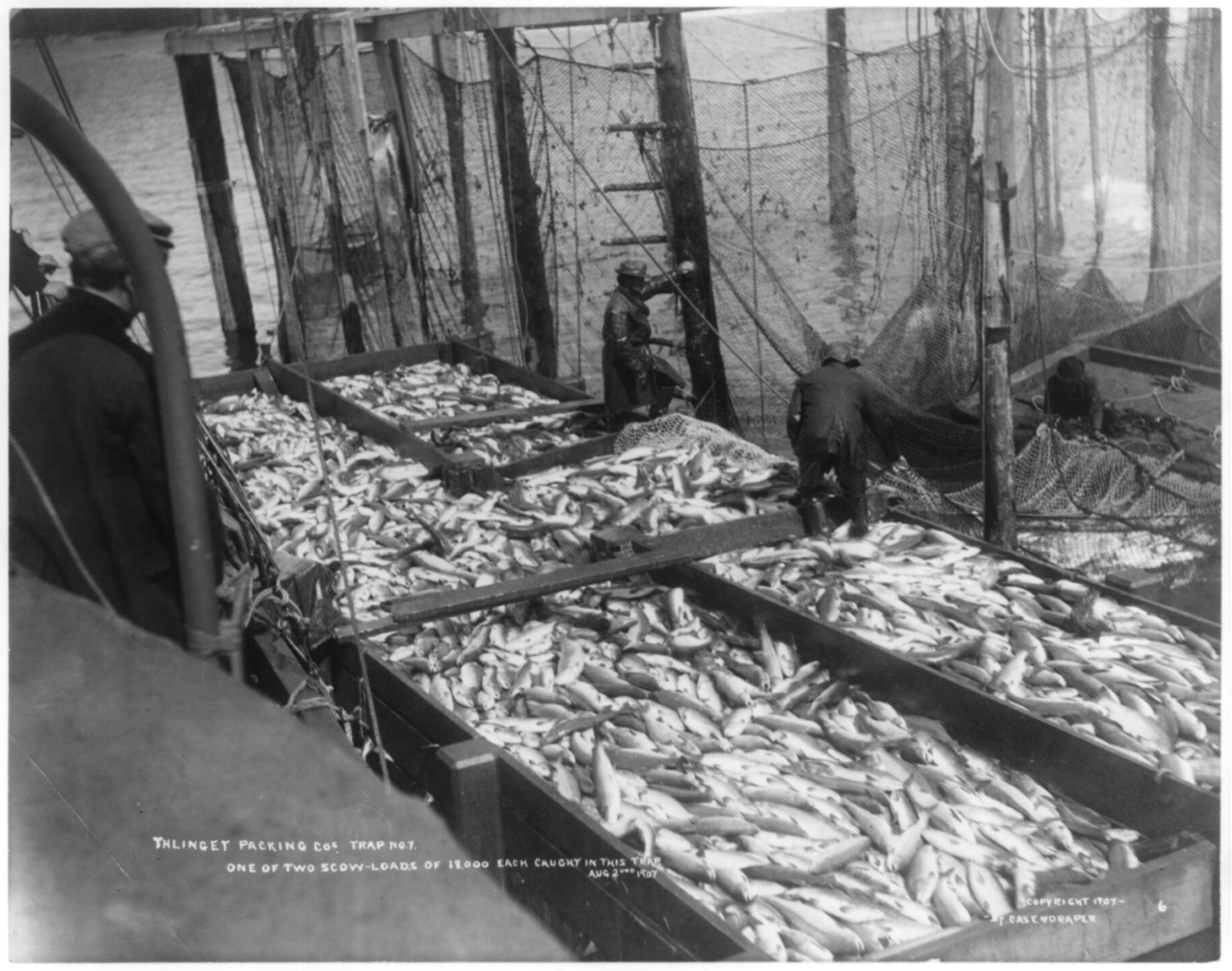
Case and Draper photo of a scow load of salmon in Alaska
