= Koret Jewish Book Award =

- Description: Best books on Jewish life and culture
- Country: United States
- Presented by: Koret Foundation

The Koret Jewish Book Award is an annual award that recognizes "recently published books on any aspect of Jewish life in the categories of biography/autobiography and literary studies, fiction, history and philosophy/thought published in, or translated into, English." The award was established in 1998 by the Koret Foundation, in cooperation with the National Foundation for Jewish Culture, to increase awareness of the best new Jewish books and their authors.

Professor Samuel Zipperstein of Stanford University oversaw the awards from their creation until 2005, when the Koret Foundation decided to increase public interest in the awards by honoring books that were less academic and more accessible to readers. Jewish Family & Life!, a non-profit organization, was selected to manage the awards. Its CEO, Rabbi Yosef Abramowitz, stated that he hoped to transform the awards into something akin to Oprah's Book Club. The History category and the Biography, Autobiography or Literary Study category were eliminated and replaced with a new category, Jewish Life & Living.

The Koret Jewish Book Award is one of the highest honors for authors of works on Jewish subjects.

== Winners ==
=== Fiction ===
1999	(tie) Yoel Hoffmann	Katschen & The Book of Joseph
	Brian Morton	Starting Out in the Evening
2000	A. B. Yehoshua	A Journey to the End of the Millennium
2001	Philip Roth	The Human Stain
2002	Isaac Babel, Nathalie Babel (editor)	The Complete Works of Isaac Babel
2003	Henryk Grynberg	Drohobycz, Drohobycz and Other Stories: True Tales from the Holocaust and Life After
2004	(tie) Aharon Megged	Foiglman
	Barbara Honigmann	A Love Made Out of Nothing & Zohara's Journey
2005	Tony Eprile	The Persistence of Memory
2006	David Grossman	Her Body Knows

=== Jewish Life and Living ===
2006	Rochel Berman	Dignity Beyond Death

=== History (discontinued) ===
1999	Miriam Bodian	Hebrews of the Portuguese Nation: Conversos and Community in Early Modern Amsterdam
2000	Chava Weissler	Voices of the Matriarchs: Listening to the Prayers of Early Modern Jewish Women
2001	David B. Ruderman	Jewish Enlightenment in an English Key: Anglo-Jewry's Construction of Modern Jewish Thought
2002	Eli Lederhendler	New York Jews and the Decline of Urban Ethnicity -- 1950-1970
2003	Benjamin Nathans	Beyond the Pale: The Jewish Encounter with Late Imperial Russia
2004	Shmuel Feiner	The Jewish Enlightenment
2005	Elisheva Baumgarten	Mothers and Children: Jewish Family Life in Medieval Europe

=== Philosophy and Thought ===
1999	Arnold Eisen	Rethinking Modern Judaism Ritual, Commandment, Community
2000	David Patterson	Along the Edge of Annihilation: The Collapse and Recovery of Life in the Holocaust Diary
2001	Kenneth Seeskin	Searching for a Distant God: The Legacy of Maimonides
2002	(tie) Samuel Heilman	When a Jew Dies: The Ethnography of a Bereaved Son
	Ken Koltun-Fromm	Moses Hess and Modern Jewish Identity
2003	Moshe Idel	Absorbing Perfections: Kabbalah and Interpretation
2004	Daniel Matt	The Zohar, Pritzker Edition, Volumes I and II
2005	Steven Greenberg	Wrestling with God and Men: Homosexuality in the Jewish Tradition
2006	Rebecca Goldstein	Betraying Spinoza

=== Biography, Autobiography or Literary Study (discontinued) ===
2000	Steven Nadler	Spinoza: A Life
2001	Cynthia Ozick	Quarrel & Quandary: Essays
2002	Dorothy Gallagher	How I Came Into My Inheritance and Other True Stories
2003	Tikva Frymer-Kensky	Reading the Women of the Bible
2004	Benjamin Harshav	Marc Chagall and His Times: A Documentary Narrative
2005	Amos Oz	A Tale of Love and Darkness

=== Children's Literature ===
2005	Karen Hesse, Wendy Watson (illustrator)	The Cats in Krasinski Square
2006	Howard Schwartz, Kristina Swarner (illustrator)	Before You Were Born

=== Special awards ===
German writer W. G. Sebald received a special Koret award in 2002 for his contributions to literature. Steven J. Zipperstein, the director of the Korets, cited Sebald's novel Austerlitz as a particularly impressive work. Sebald died several months before the awards ceremony.

In 2006, Jonathan Safran Foer's novel Everything is Illuminated received JBooks.com's People's Choice award for the best Jewish work of fiction of the previous decade, as determined by 1,500 voters in an online contest.
