= Ethel Grodzins Romm =

American author, journalist, and engineer (1925–2021)

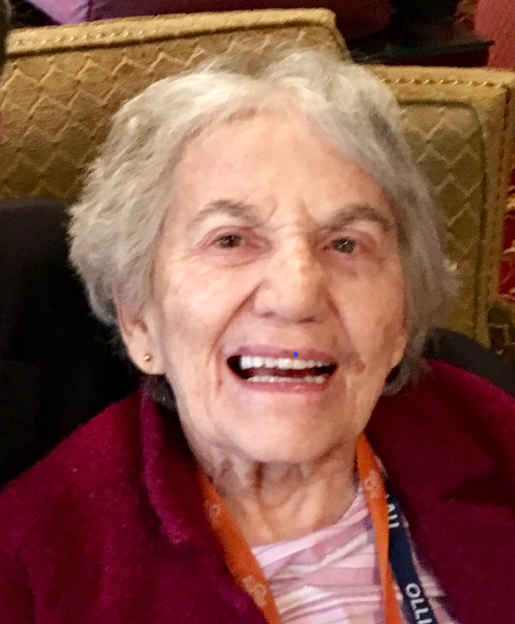
Romm in 2017

Ethel Grodzins Romm (March 3, 1925 – November 9, 2021) was an American author, journalist, project manager and environmental technology company CEO. She also served as co-chair of the Lyceum Society of the New York Academy of Sciences.

Romm graduated from high school in 1942 and trained as a mechanical engineering draftsman. She worked for the U.S. Air Force for the rest of World War II, becoming a project supervisor. For a decade after the war, at an engineering firm, she led crews that designed power transformers for General Electric. In the 1950s she married and started a family, while beginning to write books and articles and to teach interior and construction design. In the 1980s, she became a project, construction and building manager for Hartz Mountain Industries and then was President and Chief Executive Officer of Niton Corporation, an environmental science company, from 1988 to 1997. She was Co-Chair of the Lyceum Society from 2001 to 2016.

== Life and career ==
Romm was born in Lowell, Massachusetts, the daughter of David Melvin Grodzins and his wife Taube Grodzins, Jewish emigrants, with roots in Poland and Grodno, Belarus. She grew up in Manchester, New Hampshire, and graduated from Manchester Central High School in 1942. Her brother is physicist Lee Grodzins, and her sister was librarian and library science expert Anne Grodzins Lipow.

Upon graduating from high school, Romm was trained as a mechanical engineering draftsman at Bausch Machine Tool Company in Massachusetts. With many men away from home serving in World War II, she was quickly hired by the U.S. Air Force at Westover Air Force Base in Massachusetts as a civilian draftsman, where she stayed for the rest of the war, becoming a project supervisor and head of the drafting department. After the war, she worked for Associate Engineers, Inc., in Agawam, Massachusetts, from 1946 to 1954, where she headed crews that designed power transformers for General Electric. She then married newspaper reporter Al Romm (1926–1999) and moved, in 1957, to Middletown, New York, where her husband became the first editor of the Times Herald-Record newspaper and later vice president for news of Ottaway Newspapers. The couple had three sons, David, the host and producer of Shockwave Radio Theater on KFAI-FM; Daniel, a physician; and Joseph, a writer, physicist and climate expert.

While in Middletown, over the next 25 years, Romm became an author, journalist and interior and construction designer and lectured on those subjects at Orange County Community College. In 1960, she won her third Dorothy Dawes Awards for excellence in home furnishings reporting. Romm had articles published in Editor & Publisher, the ABA Journal, Esquire, New York Magazine and Huffington Post among others. Among other topics, she wrote about '60s counterculture and the underground press, writing and editing style, Education and the intersection of engineering and gender equality. Romm gained additional notice for an incident at the White House, in 1972, where she and her husband had been invited as part of a gathering of the American Society of Newspaper Editors. The Secret Service became aware that she had a reputation for speaking her mind and was opposed to the war in Vietnam. While the couple was waiting in the reception line to meet President Richard Nixon, a Secret Service agent asked Romm her intentions regarding any statements that she might make to the president. He told her that he was concerned "about the president's time". Romm and her husband left without meeting the president and later received an apology from the White House, saying that it was not White House policy to question writers and editors waiting to meet the president.

Romm was a project, construction and building manager for Hartz Mountain Industries in New York City from 1984 to 1988. She then was President, Chief Executive Officer of Niton Corporation, in Bedford, Massachusetts, from 1988 to 1997, which designed and built lead and radon detectors, portable X-ray analyzers and other environmental science equipment patented by her brother Lee. She was Co-Chair of the Lyceum Society of the New York Academy of Sciences from 2001 to 2016. She was also a member of the Roosevelt Island Resident Association Common Council. In 2016, Workmen's Circle devoted its annual winter benefit to a celebration of her life and work.

Romm died from Alzheimer's disease in Washington, D.C., on November 9, 2021, at the age of 96.

=== Books by Romm ===
- The Open Conspiracy: What America's Angry Generation Is Saying, Stackpole Books (1970) ISBN 0811711641
- Marvelous Machines (co-author James McCrea), Holt, Rinehart and Winston (1973) ISBN 003084620X
- Throw Out Wednesday, Satellite Books (1973) ISBN 0030846315
- A Labor Viewpoint: Another Opinion (Ethel Romm, ed). Essays by Sol Chaikin. Foreword by Senator Daniel Patrick Moynihan; Introduction by Romm, Library Research Associates (1980) ISBN 0-912526-26-2
- Strategies in Reading, Harcourt Brace Jovanovich (1984) ISBN 0153371242
