= Richard K. Yamamoto =

American physicist and professor

- Born: Richard Kumeo Yamamoto; June 29, 1935; U.S. Territory of Hawaii
- Died: October 16, 2009 (aged 74); Pelham, New Hampshire, U.S.
- Resting place: Hawaii Memorial Park, Oahu, Hawaii
- Education: Massachusetts Institute of Technology
- Spouses: Lily Yamamoto; Kathleen Barreto-Yamamoto
- Children: 3 daughters: Cara-Jean Donaghey; Lani Yamamoto; Sharon Yamamoto Takaki
- Scientific career
- Fields: Experimental high energy particle physics
- Workplaces: Massachusetts Institute of Technology (Laboratory for Nuclear Science); Massachusetts Institute of Technology (faculty)
- Thesis: Charge exchange scattering of negative pi-mesons near 1000 Mev (1963)
- Doctoral advisor: Irwin A. Pless
- Doctoral students: James E. Brau

Richard K. Yamamoto (1935–2009) was an American elementary particle physicist and professor of physics at MIT focusing primarily on the study of leptons and quarks and their interactions. To this end he was involved with experiments at Brookhaven, Fermilab, and SLAC, including the BaBar Experiment. He was also known for his expertise in building experimental hardware, which he shared with students.

== Biographical information and education ==
Richard K. Yamamoto was born June 29, 1935, in Hawaii, the son of Richard M. Yamamoto, a service station proprietor, and Yatsuko Yamamoto, a waitress. He became a freshman at the Massachusetts Institute of Technology (MIT) in 1953, earning an A.B. in 1957 and a Ph.D. in 1963, working with advisor Irwin A. Pless.

He was known to enjoy working with his hands. A practiced mechanic and a devotee of fast cars, he rebuilt his own car engines and took driving lessons at NASCAR tracks.

With his first wife Lily, a graphic designer, Yamamoto had three daughters and eight grandchildren. His second wife, Kathleen (Cougan) Barreto (1955-2012) was from Sunnyvale, California, and had a career in Silicon Valley.

Yamamoto died October 16, 2009, of complications related to lung cancer.

== Career ==
Yamamoto spent his entire career at MIT, first as a researcher at the Laboratory for Nuclear Science in 1963, and as an instructor in 1964. In 1965 he became an assistant professor, and in 1972 a full professor. His colleague Edmund Bertschinger said, "His kindness and gentle enthusiasm helped make the department an exciting and supportive place for everyone in physics."

Yamamoto loved teaching, both in the classroom and in the laboratory. For many years he taught the Junior Lab at MIT, as a master of all the experiments.

== Research ==
Yamamoto conducted research at three national laboratories: Brookhaven, Fermilab, and SLAC. At Fermilab, was credited with "a leading role in the creation, operation, and exploitation of the 30-inch Bubble Chamber Hybrid Spectrometer in studying hadronic interactions". In the SLD collaboration at SLAC, he studied Z0 boson production and decay in polarized electron-positron collisions, measuring "the electroweak mixing angle based on a polarized electron-positron scattering". Yamamoto's group contributed a "precise measurement of the electron beam polarization based on Compton scattering". The MIT faculty newsletter described it as "the most precise measurement of the electroweak mixing angle (sin2θW) based on a single process". That measurement was "an important constraint on models of electroweak symmetry breaking, including the possible mass of the Higgs Boson in the Standard Model".

Yamamoto in lab with magnetic spectrometer

Colleagues have said his management style was low-key, yet effective. Colleague Peter Fisher began working in 1994 with Yamamoto. Fisher said, "He loved to work with students, making things...He was happiest when he had his hands on some knob, adjusting a mirror, and looking at an oscilloscope." Fisher commented, "Dick was a mild-mannered guy, but when push came to shove, he stood up to the system." Fisher described a situation at SLAC when the Center's director was pressuring Yamamoto's team to publish their results, even though the team members were puzzled why two different electron-counting methods produced different results. Yamamoto insisted that they needed to know why the numbers were off, and they only published when they figured it out.

His group also "conducted precise studies of decays of charmed and bottom particles" at the BaBar B-Factory. He was involved in creating the BaBar drift chamber, contributing to measurement of CP violation and properties of heavy mesons. One source commented, "He was happiest building something and making it work. Many of his students have gone on to careers in physics and carry with them his love of experimental hardware."

== Honors, awards ==
- 1978 American Institute of Physics Fellow
- 2008 winner of MIT's "Infinite Mile Award"
