= Anne Grodzins Lipow =

American librarian

Anne Lipow

Anne Lipow (February 27, 1935 – September 9, 2004) was a prominent librarian who worked at the University of California, Berkeley Libraries. In 1992, she retired from Berkeley and started the Library Solutions Institute and Press.

== Early life and career ==
Lipow was born in Manchester, New Hampshire and was raised in Springfield, Massachusetts, the daughter of David Melvin Grodzins and his wife Taube Grodzins, Jewish emigrants, with roots in Poland and Grodno, Belarus. Her brother is physicist Lee Grodzins, and her sister, Ethel Grodzins Romm, was an author, project manager, CEO and co-chair of the Lyceum Society of the New York Academy of Sciences.

Lipow moved to Berkeley, California, from New York with her first husband Arthur Lipow in 1957 to attend graduate school. She received her MLS degree from UC Berkeley's Library School, graduating in 1960. She joined the staff of the UC Berkeley Library in 1961. In 1973 she created the BAKER document delivery service, which remains in service today. In 1982 she was appointed Education Officer for the UC Berkeley Libraries. In that role she developed a series of technology and library training courses for faculty, staff, and students. She retired as UC's library information officer in 1991 to start her own consulting service Library Solutions Institute.

== Library Solutions Institute and Press ==
The first event that her newly founded Library Solutions Institute offered was a full-day of hands-on Internet training for librarians, in June 1992. Scheduled to coincide with the annual conference of The American Library Association in San Francisco, it was held over two days in Berkeley, for two different cohorts of trainees. Spanning both groups of trainees was a reception and a talk by Clifford Lynch. This workshop required Anne and her colleagues John Ober and Roy Tennant to develop handouts describing various Internet protocols and services. The handouts were collected into a binder for workshop participants. Following the workshop, Lipow decided to publish the binder as a book. She changed the name of Library Solutions Institute to Library Solutions Institute and Press and published the book in the Fall of 1992 as Crossing the Internet Threshold: An Instructional Handbook. This was the same year that O'Reilly and Associates published "one of the first popular books about the Internet" (Wikipedia article).

Library Solutions Institute and Press went on to publish dozens of titles relating to libraries, technology, and new strategies for serving library clientele. Various workshops were also held around the world regarding these topics.

== Influence ==
Anne Lipow and her colleagues created the first training materials on how to use the Internet for librarians. These materials were then used for workshops put on by the Library Solutions Institute and Press, UC Berkeley Extension, Infopeople (a California library training organization), and other professional organizations. Crossing the Internet Threshold was translated into Romanian, Bulgarian, and Turkish, and used in those countries to train librarians. It was also translated into Spanish and used widely in South America and elsewhere.

Her publications on the changing nature of reference work in libraries were very influential, and led to invited speaking engagements around the world.

== Bibliography ==
- University of California, Library Affirmative Action Program for Women Committee, Anne G. Lipow, chair. A Report on the Status of Women Employed in the Library of the University of California, Berkeley, with Recommendations for Affirmative Action. Berkeley, CA: University of California, Berkeley, 1971.
- Fay, James S. and Anne Grodzins Lipow. California Campaign Contributors: 1982 Directory. Santa Barbara, CA: Pacific Data Resources, 1982.
- Lipow, Anne Grodzins. Job Training: Developing Staff Training Plans and Your Feedback Skills: Workbook. Chicago: American Library Association, 1984.
- Lipow, Anne Grodzins. "Prestige, Appointments, and Ready Professional Attention," The Journal of Academic Librarianship 11 (May 1985): 70–1.
- Lipow, Anne Grodzins, and Joseph A. Rosenthal. "The Researcher and the Library: a Partnership in the Near Future," Library Journal 111 (September 1, 1986): 154–6.
- Lipow, Anne Grodzins, coordinating editor. Staff Development: A Practical Guide. Chicago: Library Administration and Management Association, American Library Association, 1988.
- Lipow, Anne Grodzins. "The Online Catalog: Exceeding Our Grasp." American Libraries 20 (1989): 862–5.
- Lipow, Anne Grodzins. "Why Training Doesn't Stick: Who is to Blame?," Library Trends 38 (Summer 1989): 62–72.
- Lipow, Anne Grodzins. "Training For Change: Staff Development in a New Age," Journal of Library Administration 10(4) (1989): 87–97.
- Lipow, Anne Grodzins. "Handling the Negative Effects of an Online Catalog," In Integrated Library Catalogs, edited by Jenifer Cargil, 61–68. London: Meckler, 1991.
- Lipow, Anne Grodzins. "Teach Online Catalog Users the MARC Format? Are You Kidding?," The Journal of Academic Librarianship 17 (1991): 80–5.
- Lipow, Anne Grodzins. "Outreach to Faculty: Why and How." In Working With Faculty in the New Electronic Library: Papers and Session Materials Presented at the Nineteenth National LOEX Library Instruction Conference, Eastern Michigan University, 7-24. Ann Arbor, Mich.: Pierian Press, 1992.
- Lipow, Anne, and Deborah Carver. Staff Development: A Practical Guide. Chicago, IL: American Library Association, Library Administration and Management Association, 1992.
- Lipow, Anne Grodzins. "A Catalog or a Reference Tool? or, MELVYL's Exquisite Search Features You Can't Know Until Someone Tells You," Information Technology and Libraries 11 (1992): 281–4.
- Tennant, Roy, John Ober and Anne G. Lipow. Crossing the Internet Threshold: An Instructional Handbook. Berkeley, CA: Library Solutions Press, 1993.
- Lipow, Anne G. and Sheila D. Creth, eds. Building Partnerships: Computing and Library Professionals. Proceedings of Library Solutions Institute No. 3, Chicago: 1994.
- Lipow, Anne Grodzins. "Rethinking Reference in Academic Libraries (Book Review)," Research Strategies 12 (1994): 127.
- Lipow, Anne Grodzins, and Gail A. Schlachter. "Thinking out loud: Who will give reference Service in the Digital Environment?" Reference & User Services Quarterly, 37(2), 125–129. 1997.
- Lipow, Anne Grodzins. "Reference Services in a Digital Age" Reference & User Services Quarterly 38(1) (Fall 1998): 47–48.
- Lipow, Anne Grodzins. "Serving the Remote User: Reference Service in the Digital Environment," In Ninth Australasian Information Online & On Disc Conference and Exhibition, Sydney, Australia, (19–21 January 1999): 106–26.
- Lipow, Anne Grodzins. "'In Your Face' Reference Service" Library Journal 124(13) (August 1999): 50–52.
- Lipow, Anne Grodzins. "How to Get Started: Questions to Ask," In: Staff Development. Chicago: American Library Association, 2001.
- Lipow, Anne Grodzins (2002). The Virtual Reference Librarian's Handbook. New York: Neal-Schuman.
- Lipow, Anne Grodzins. "The Future of Reference: Point-of-Need Reference Service: No Longer an Afterthought," Reference Services Review, 31(1) (2003): 31–5.
- Lipow, Anne Grodzins. "The Librarian Has Left the Building -- But To Where?" Internet Reference Services Quarterly, 8(1/2) (2003): 9–18.
