= Moyers & Company =

US commentary and interview public television series (2012–2015)

- Presented by: Bill Moyers
- Country of origin: United States
- Original language: English
- No. of episodes: 322 (list of episodes)

Production
- Production location: New York City
- Running time: 57 minutes
- Production companies: Public Affairs Television; WNET

Original release
- Network: Syndicated, on most PBS stations
- Release: January 13, 2012 – January 2, 2015

Moyers & Company was a commentary and interview television show hosted by Bill Moyers, and broadcast via syndication on public television stations in the United States. The weekly show covered current affairs affecting everyday Americans, and featured extended conversations with guests on issues of the day. It premiered on January 13, 2012, and concluded on January 2, 2015.

The show was produced by Public Affairs Television, taped in the studios of New York City PBS affiliate station WNET, and distributed by American Public Television (APT) with major funding from the Carnegie Corporation of New York.

== History ==
Longtime tele-journalist Bill Moyers had hosted Bill Moyers Journal and Now on PBS, then retired from PBS in April 2010 (amid behind-the-scenes pressure from PBS leadership throughout the second Bush administration, which had moved to "create balance" by increasing politically conservative programming at the expense of liberal programs like Moyers'). In August 2011, Moyers announced that he would come out of retirement to host a new show, titled Moyers & Company. Despite Moyers receiving $2 million in funding from the Carnegie Corporation of New York, alone (a perennial sponsor of PBS programming), and Moyers' track record of creating and hosting 2 hit PBS shows, PBS did not offer the new show a time slot on its 2012 network schedule. Instead, the show was syndicated (i.e., distributed one station at-a-time) by American Public Television (APT) to local public television stations.

Moyers said that he returned to television because "nothing else was as interesting. I had done some writing and speaking, but I love television. It lets me work with colleagues and comrades. And I had breath and I had energy and I had funders." He said the show would focus less on field reporting and more on "meaty conversations".

Moyers also said that he planned for the show to run for two years, and then retire at age 80. In the event, the show lasted three years.

== Broadcast ==
Moyers & Company was distributed by APT for free to public television stations (PBS affiliates), who aired it either in prime time on Fridays or afternoon on weekends. It was broadcast in 93% of all television markets in the United States, including 27 of the top 30.

The show was also available on radio and online.

== Reception ==
Associated Press critic Frazier Moore said the program would be "gratefully received" by those who have followed Moyers throughout his career. He added that the show promised to be "no less important, thoughtful and far-flung in its interests than his past TV projects, addressing subjects that range from politics to poetry, and with a nuanced approach that defies the polarization endemic to most TV interview programs." David Bianculli of NPR called the show's premiere "one of my favorite TV moments of this year" calling Moyers's new role "valuable". Richard Huff of New York's Daily News gave the premiere a 3/5 rating and remarked, "Moyers’ genial way makes it easy to digest for those willing to invest a quietly paced hour."

Brian Lowry noted Moyers's unabashedly liberal perspective, but argued that "[e]ven if you reject every word he says, it's a valuable articulation of a certain point of view... without name-calling, raising voices or fabricating arguments."

Fairness and Accuracy in Reporting commended the return of Moyers on public television for again airing voices unrepresented and underrepresented in the commercial media while questioning PBS's commitment to fulfilling its stated mission of airing those voices.
