= Orbis Cascade Alliance =

Library consortium in the Northwestern United States

- Formation: 2003
- Location: United States
- Website: www.orbiscascade.org

The Orbis Cascade Alliance is a library consortium serving academic libraries in the Northwestern United States. The consortium was formed through the 2003 merger of two previous consortia, Orbis and Cascade, which consisted of libraries in Oregon and Washington, respectively. The Alliance functioned as part of the University of Oregon until its incorporation as a nonprofit on February 1, 2011. The Alliance has 38 governing members, consisting of colleges and universities in Oregon and Washington, plus the University of Idaho. The Alliance serves many types of libraries in a broader area that includes Oregon, Washington, Idaho, Montana, Utah, Wyoming, Alaska, and Hawaii.

== Members ==
- Central Oregon Community College
- Central Washington University
- Chemeketa Community College
- Clackamas Community College
- Clark College
- Eastern Oregon University
- Eastern Washington University
- George Fox University
- Gonzaga University
- Lane Community College
- Lewis & Clark College
- Linfield College
- Mt. Hood Community College
- Oregon Health & Science University
- Oregon Institute of Technology
- Oregon State University
- Pacific University
- Portland Community College
- Portland State University
- Reed College
- Saint Martin's University
- Seattle Pacific University
- Seattle University
- Southern Oregon University
- The Evergreen State College
- University of Idaho
- University of Oregon
- University of Portland
- University of Puget Sound
- University of Washington
- Walla Walla University
- Warner Pacific College
- Washington State University
- Western Oregon University
- Western Washington University
- Whitman College
- Whitworth University
- Willamette University

== See also ==
- Archives West
- Case & Draper
