= Slavic literature =

Slavic literature or Slavonic literature refers to the literature in any of the Slavic languages:

- Belarusian literature
- Bosnian literature
- Bulgarian literature
- Croatian literature
- Czech literature
- Kashubian literature
- Macedonian literature
- Polish literature
- Montenegrin literature
- Russian literature
- Serbian literature
- Slovak literature
- Slovene literature
- Sorbian literature
- Ukrainian literature

Outside the Russian literature and to an extent Serbian literature, Slavic literature has been described as generally neglected in English literature studies and reference works.

== See also ==
- Slavic studies
- Old Church Slavonic language
