= Kenneth Seeskin =

American philosopher (born 1947)

- Born: 1947 (age 78–79)
- Awards: Koret Jewish Book Award (2001)

Education
- Education: Yale University (PhD)

Philosophical work
- Era: 21st-century philosophy
- Region: Western philosophy
- Institutions: Northwestern University
- Main interests: Jewish philosophy

Kenneth Seeskin (born 1947) is an American philosopher and Philip M. and Ethel Klutznick Professor Emeritus of Jewish Civilization at Northwestern University. He is known for his works on Jewish philosophy. Seeskin won the Koret Jewish Book Award for his book Searching for a Distant God: The Legacy of Maimonides in 2001.

== Books ==
- The Cambridge Companion to Maimonides, Cambridge University Press, 2005
- Maimonides on the Origin of the World, Cambridge University Press, 2005
- Autonomy in Jewish Philosophy, Cambridge University Press, 2001
- Searching for a Distant God: The Legacy of Maimonides, Oxford University Press, 2000
- Jewish Philosophy in a Secular Age, SUNY Press, 1990
- Maimonides: A Guide for Today's Perplexed, Behrman House, 1991
- Thinking about the Torah: A Philosopher Reads the Bible, University of Nebraska Press, 2016
