= Eugeniusz Grodziński =

Polish philosopher

Eugeniusz Grodziński

Eugeniusz Grodziński (January 10, 1912, Pskov, Russian Empire – October 11, 1994, Warsaw, Poland) was a Polish philosopher, whose research areas were philosophy of natural language, philosophical foundations of logic, and philosophical problems of psychology.

He was born as Yefim Grodzinski in Pskov, Russian Empire, studied law, and in 1957 (during the Repatriation of Poles (1955–1959)) emigrated from Vilnius, the Soviet Union to Warsaw, Poland. Until his retirement, he was a professor at the Institute of Philosophy and Sociology (IFiS) of the Polish Academy of Sciences.

== Books ==
- Grodziński, E. 1969. Język, metajęzyk, rzeczywistość. Warszawa, Państwowe Wydawnictwo Naukowe
- Grodziński, E. 1978. Monizm a dualizm : z dziejów refleksji filozoficznej nad myśleniem i mową. Wrocław : Państwowa Akademia Nauk; OSSOLINEUM
- Grodziński, E. 1985. Językoznawcy i logicy o synonimach i synonimii : studium z pogranicza dwóch nauk. Wrocław : Zakład Narodowy im. Ossolińskich
- Grodziński, E. 1988. Koryfeusze nie są nieomylni : szkice polemiczne. Wrocław : Zakład Narodowy im. Ossolińskich
- Grodziński, E. 1986. Myślenie hipotetyczne : studium na pograniczu ontologii, filozofii języka i psychologii. Wrocław : Zakład Narodowy im. Ossolińskich
- Grodziński, E. 1983. Paradoksy semantyczne. Wrocław : Zakład Narodowy im. Ossolińskich
- Grodziński, E. 1980. Wypowiedzi performatywne : z aktualnych zagadnień filozofii języka. Wrocław : Zakład Narodowy im. Ossolińskich.
- Grodziński, E. 1983. Zarys ogólnej teorii imion własnych. Wrocław : Zakład Narodowy im. Ossolińskich
- Grodziński, E. 1981. Zarys teorii nonsensu (An outline of the theory of nonsense). Wrocław : Zakład Narodowy im. Ossolińskich
- Grodziński, E. 1964. Znaczenie słowa w języku naturalnym. Warszawa, Państwowe Wydawnictwo Naukowe.
- Grodziński, E. 1989. Filozoficzne podstawy logiki wielowartościowej. Warszawa, Państwowe Wydawnictwo Naukowe.
