= Archives West =

American archival website

Archives West is an online catalog of descriptive information about the archival collections at various institutions in the western United States (Idaho, Montana, Oregon, Alaska, Utah and Washington). It was established in 2005, and is a program offering of the Orbis Cascade Alliance. From 2005 to 2015, the site was known as Northwest Digital Archives (NWDA); the name changed as part of a substantial redesign to better describe the site's content and scope.

It was funded by the National Endowment for the Humanities in two phases between 2002 and 2007, and by the National Historical Publications and Records Commission. Since 2007, it has been supported by the contributing institutions.

It uses Encoded Archival Description (EAD).

== Contributing institutions ==
- Boise State University
- Central Washington University
- Central Oregon Community College
- Confederated Tribes of the Siletz
- Eastern Oregon University
- Eastern Washington University
- George Fox University
- Lane Community College
- Lewis & Clark College
- Linfield College
- Montana Historical Society
- Montana State University
- Oregon Health & Science University
- Oregon Historical Society
- Oregon Institute of Technology
- Oregon State University
- Pacific Lutheran University
- Pacific University
- Portland State University
- Salt Lake County Archives
- Seattle Municipal Archives
- Seattle Pacific University
- Seattle Museum of History & Industry
- Seattle University
- Tacoma Public Library
- The Evergreen State College
- University of Alaska Fairbanks
- University of Idaho
- University of Montana
- University of Oregon
- University of Puget Sound
- University of Utah
- University of Washington
- Utah State University
- Washington State University
- Western Oregon University
- Western Washington University
- Whitman College
- Whitworth University
- Willamette University
